= 2018 South America tornado outbreak =

Tornado outbreak in Brazil and Argentina

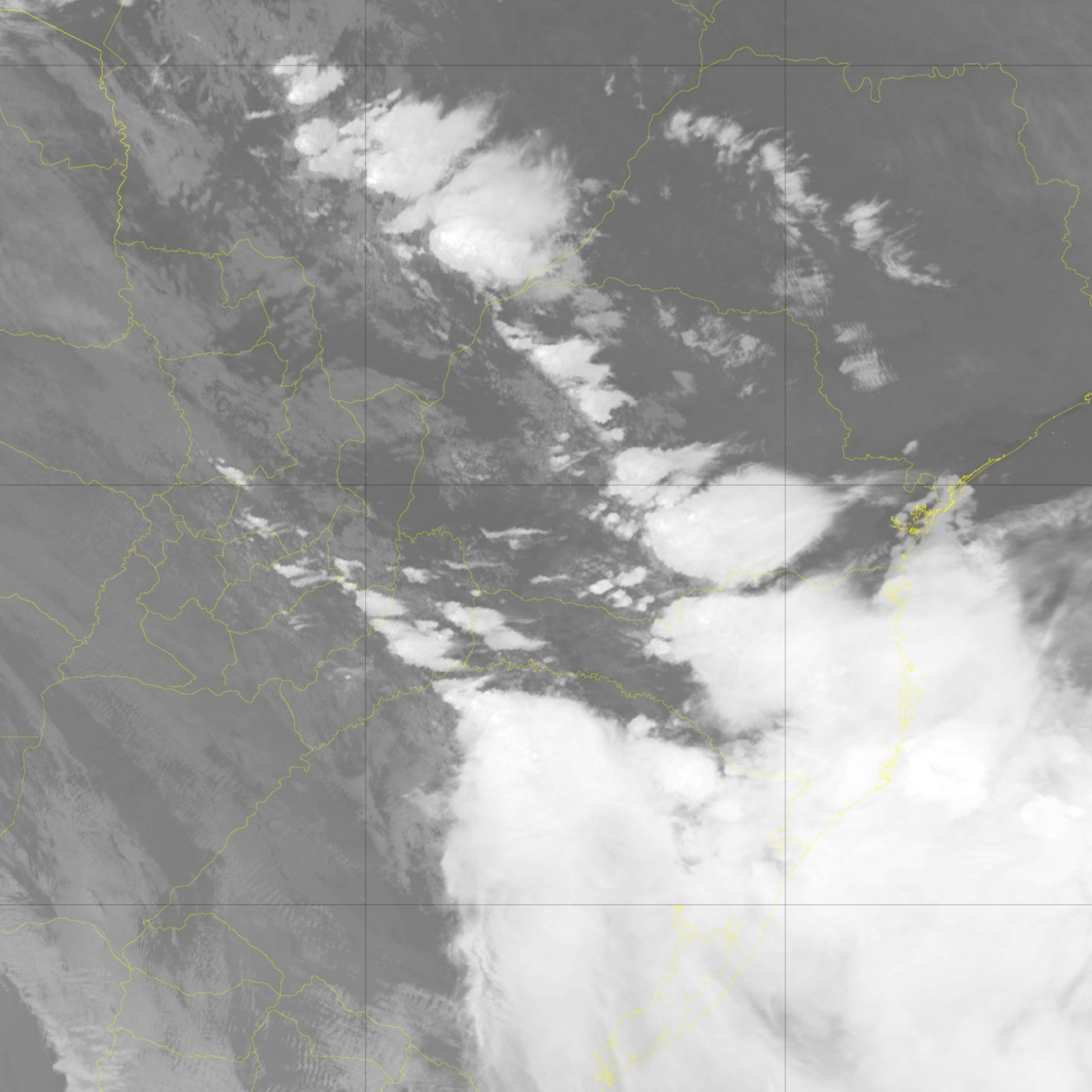
- The storm system responsible for the outbreak over the region in the early morning of 12 June, shortly before the Coxilha tornado dissipated.

Meteorological history
- Duration: 11–12 June 2018

Tornado outbreak
- Tornadoes: 11
- Max. rating: F4 tornado
- Duration: 8 hours, 21 minutes
- Highest winds: Tornadic – >334 km/h (208 mph) (Coxilha, Rio Grande do Sul F4 on 12 June)

Overall effects
- Fatalities: 3
- Injuries: 34
- Areas affected: Rio Grande do Sul, Misiones
- Part of the tornado outbreaks of 2018

A destructive regional tornado outbreak spawned 11 tornadoes across the Brazilian state of Rio Grande do Sul and the Argentine province of Misiones from the night of 11 June to the early morning of 12 June 2018. This outbreak was one of the most well-documented and most impactful tornado outbreaks in the history of South America, spawning the strongest tornado on the continent in nearly a decade and having had a partial damage survey conducted in its wake.

The most impactful tornado of the outbreak was a long-tracked, deadly tornado that tracked through northern Rio Grande do Sul, particularly devastating the municipality of Coxilha. The intensity of this tornado is debated—different organizations rated it either F3 or F4.

== Meteorological synopsis ==
=== Atmospheric setup ===
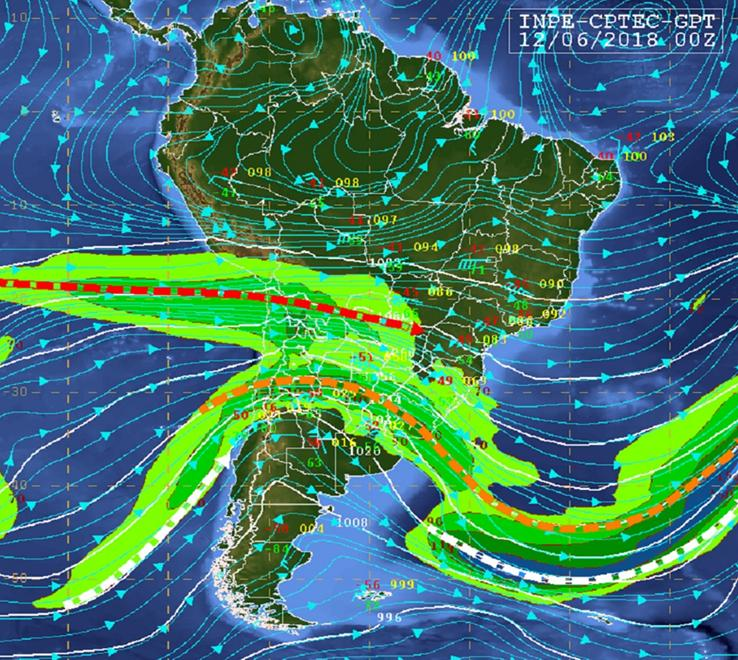
Synoptic chart showing the formation of the trough over the area, which played a major role in initiating supercell development during the outbreak.

This outbreak took place after a three-day period of unseasonably warm, moist air being advected into the area by an intense low-level jet stream; dew points in southern Brazil reached 18 °C (64 °F), signaling a persistently unstable atmosphere. A shortwave trough over the region helped maintain this due to a strong horizontal pressure gradient between a low-pressure area over northwestern Argentina and a high-pressure area over the Atlantic Ocean. An upper-level trough also contributed to steep mid-level lapse rates.

The aforementioned strong jet also created strong low-level wind shear, which supported the development of supercell thunderstorms. Low lifting condensation levels combined with weak convective inhibition made it easier for supercell thunderstorms to develop, and heightened their potential to produce tornadoes. The environment was conducive to tornadoes by the afternoon, and storms started rapidly developing in the warm sector by the mid- to late-afternoon on 11 June; most developed over northeastern Argentina or southern Paraguay before moving into the primary outbreak area over southern Brazil.

=== Coxilha tornado family ===
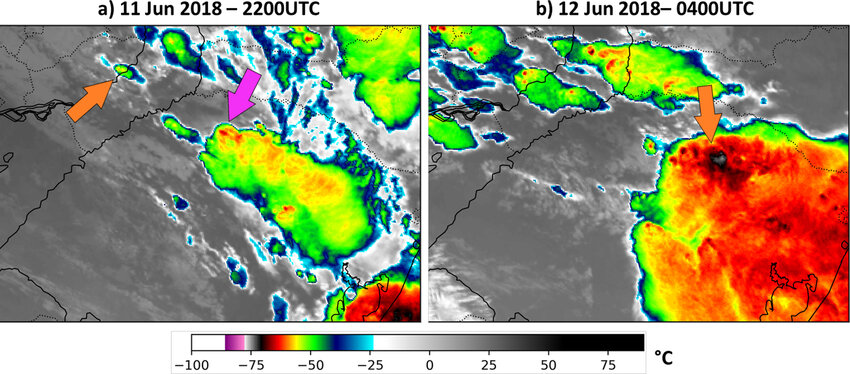
Satellite thermal infrared imagery centered in RS shows the overshooting tops of the developing supercells; the orange arrow shows the Coxilha supercell while the purple arrow is another tornadic supercell.

The most prolific storm of the outbreak, which would go on to produce its strongest tornadoes, began as a small storm cell over southern Paraguay, moving southeast into Misiones Province in Argentina and eventually into Rio Grande do Sul State in Brazil, where it would begin to produce tornadoes. After producing its first tornado near Dois Irmãos das Missões, it underwent a merger with a weaker storm cell. Half an hour later, it began a phase of active cyclic tornadogenesis, where it would produce several strong and destructive tornadoes.

The first tornado produced in this cyclic phase was a strong F3 tornado that impacted the Sarandi area, killing one person. As it occluded, it took a leftward turn towards the storm's inflow sector, which is not an occlusion behavior commonly seen during cyclic tornadogenesis. As this tornado was still ongoing, however, another mesocyclone developed and intensified just north of it, producing another simultaneous tornado. After this, a third, albeit much weaker, simultaneous tornado was produced by the storm. Having multiple simultaneous tornadoes from the same cyclic parent supercell is rare during a tornado outbreak; in fact, this is the first documented case of this phenomenon ever occurring in South America. Shortly after the last of these simultaneous tornadoes dissipated, yet another pair of simultaneous tornadoes touched down. The final tornado produced by this supercell was also the strongest—a violent, long-tracked tornado that was on the ground for nearly 40 minutes.

== Confirmed tornadoes ==
Confirmed tornadoes by Fujita rating
FU	F0	F1	F2	F3	F4	F5	Total
3	0	1	4	1	1	0	11

- Two tornadoes were not rated; they are included in the total number but not elsewhere in the ratings table.

=== 11 June event ===
List of confirmed tornadoes – Monday, 11 June 2018 (Note: All dates are based on the local time zone where the tornado touched down; however, all times are in Coordinated Universal Time for consistency.)
EF#	Location	State/Province	Country	Time (UTC)	Path length	Max width
FU	Chiapetta area	RS	BR	21:00	Unknown	Unknown
FU	A weak and brief tornado was filmed; no damage was reported.					
F1	NW to SE of Coxilha	RS	BR	23:40–23:44	6.3 km (3.9 mi)	50 m (55 yd)
F1	A weak and brief tornado caused light roof and tree damage in the northern portions of Coxilha. It began in forested areas northwest of the city where it would cause light vegetation damage. The worst damage occurred to houses in the northern parts of Coxilha, some of which had their roofs partially removed. The tornado again moved into forested areas, uprooting more trees and partially deroofing a farm building before dissipating.					
F?	SE of Dois Irmãos das Missões	RS	BR	01:24–01:33	8.6 km (5.3 mi)	160 m (170 yd)
F?	As the first member of the Coxilha tornado family, this tornado remained mostly over forested areas; partial/total deroofing of houses, partially collapsed grain silos, and overturned farm machinery were documented, but an in situ survey was not able to be conducted due to the remote area of the tornado's track, resulting in no official rating being given to this event.					
F3	NW to E of Sarandi	RS	BR	02:12–02:23	29.7 km (18.5 mi)	470 m (510 yd)
F3	1 death — This rain-wrapped tornado initially caused light tree damage in the Rondinha municipality before quickly intensifying to F3 strength as it debarked trees in the area. Some houses in the area had their roofs removed at F2 intensity as well, and a wooden house was completely destroyed. It passed just north of the city of Sarandi, where forests were damaged and two trucks on the RS-404 highway were overturned. A house in the area was collapsed, resulting in the death of a 69-year-old woman. Continuing southeast, the tornado re-intensified to F3 strength as it destroyed the roof and many exterior walls of a well-built brick house, particularly affecting the building's second story. It then began to make a slight turn northward, approaching the RS-324 highway, where it damaged a few more houses before weakening and dissipating.					
F2	S of Ronda Alta to N of Pontão	RS	BR	02:27–02:37	16.3 km (10.1 mi)	100 m (110 yd)
F2	While the previous tornado was still ongoing, a separate tornado touched down, collapsing a sports hall and the external walls of a concrete church.					
FU	N of Pontão	RS	BR	02:31–02:37	3.1 km (1.9 mi)	70 m (77 yd)
FU	A third simultaneous tornado touched down just south of the previous, briefly causing light vegetation damage insufficient to estimate its intensity.					
F?	N to NE of Pontão	RS	BR	02:38–02:50	14.7 km (9.1 mi)	270 m (300 yd)
F?	Another tornado touched down shortly after the previous one dissipated, removing the roofs of several sheds and houses.					
F2+	NNE of Pontão to NW of Coxilha	RS	BR	02:45–03:13	30.8 km (19.1 mi)	250 m (270 yd)
F2+	Around halfway through the previous tornado's lifespan, this tornado touched down to its north. Photographs showed two masonry houses partially destroyed at F2+ intensity. However, the height of its tornado debris signature column, which was in excess of 7.5 km (4.7 mi), suggests that it could have reached F3+ intensity.					

=== 12 June event ===
List of confirmed tornadoes – Tuesday, 12 June 2018
EF#	Location	State/Province	Country	Time (UTC)	Path length	Max width
F4 (Note: Although UFSM researchers rated the Coxilha tornado F3, they explicitly noted that its intensity may have been underrated by their analysis and that the observed tornado debris signature suggested F4+ intensity. Other meteorological organizations rated the tornado F4, thus the F4 rating is used in this article.)	NNE of Coxilha to S of Vila Lângaro to S of Água Santa to Ciríaco	RS	BR	03:23–04:03	51.6 km (32.1 mi)	950 m (1,040 yd)
F4	1 death — See section about this tornado					
FU	Giruá area	RS	BR	07:54–08:01	12.4 km (7.7 mi)	170 m (190 yd)
FU	A tornado tracked through rural areas, causing no significant damage; no survey was conducted for this event. About 600 homes were damaged in the area from both winds and large hail produced by the parent supercell.					
F2	Leandro N. Alem area	Misiones	AR	08:51–09:23	38.5 km (23.9 mi)	500 m (550 yd)
F2	1 death — A tornado impacted towns including Caá Yarí and Oberá. The roofs of several houses were ripped off, a sawmill was destroyed, and many trees were downed. One man was killed when the roof and walls of his house collapsed, and more people in the area were injured. Although no official survey was conducted, its intensity was rated in F2.					

=== Coxilha–Vila Lângaro–Água Santa–Ciríaco, Rio Grande do Sul ===
Coxilha tornado
- The tornado overturned and threw trucks on a highway near Coxilha at up to F4 intensity.

Meteorological history
- Formed: 12 June 2018, 12:23 a.m. BST (UTC−03:00)
- Dissipated: 12 June 2018, 1:03 a.m. BST (UTC–03:00)
- Duration: 40 minutes

F4 tornado
- on the Fujita scale
- Highest winds: >334 km/h (208 mph)

Overall effects
- Fatalities: 1
- Injuries: Multiple

A final tornado was produced by the cyclic supercell, which would become the strongest and longest-tracked of the outbreak. This tornado started in rural fields and forests, initially causing just vegetation damage. Soon after its formation, it rapidly intensified as it crossed the RS-463 highway between Coxilha and Tapejara. Here, three trucks were overturned on the highway and one 14-ton truck was tossed several meters into a nearby field at up to F4 intensity. Additionally, nearby trees were downed or debarked and roofs were ripped off. After crossing the highway, a grain bin silo was partially collapsed and more roofs were ripped off. Debris was wind-rowed and made into "debris missiles" that penetrated concrete walls. Continuing southeast near Vila Lângaro, the external concrete walls of a house were collapsed at F3 intensity and many weak wooden houses were completely destroyed. Small objects in this area were found 70 km (43 mi) away, an indication of a strong tornado. Approaching Água Santa, the tornado became rain-wrapped and weakened to F2 intensity. However, it soon re-intensified to F3 strength and began to debark trees and destroy many structures, including a masonry home, two chicken farms, and two transmission towers. Ten aviaries were destroyed, resulting in the death of over 220,000 chickens. From here, the tornado rapidly shrunk and weakened to just F1 intensity before impacting Ciríaco directly, where roofs were partially removed and a grain silo was partially collapsed. Despite its weaker intensity here, a 54-year-old man was killed when an exterior wall of his home collapsed. The tornado dissipated shortly after exiting the town's urban area.

== Aftermath ==
This tornado outbreak is notable for its size and intensity, which is very rare for South America. It is also unique in its response, being one of the few tornado events on the continent to receive a post-storm damage survey. The Coxilha tornado, having one of the longest and widest damage paths ever recorded on the continent, was described by the PREVOTS group as "one of the most intense tornadoes in RS in recent years."

=== Damage ===
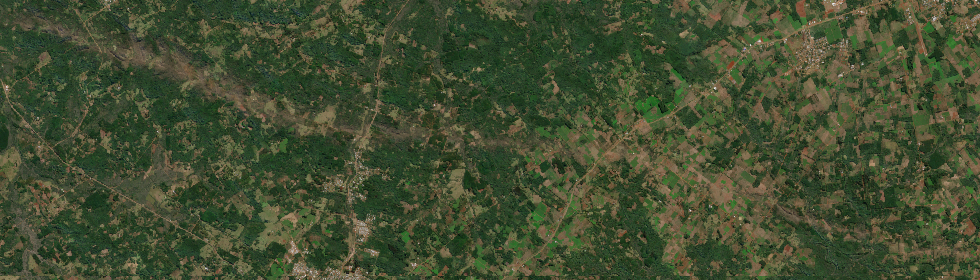
The scar left by a strong tornado that tracked north of Leandro N. Alem, Misiones, Argentina.

Overall, the tornadoes killed three people—two in Brazil and one in Argentina—and injured many. 21 municipalities were affected by the storms, and six declared states of emergency due to the weather conditions associated with the storms, which included wind and hail in addition to tornadoes. Large hail of over 6 cm (2.4 in) was observed in Porto Xavier, a city close to the Brazil-Argentina border, and again in Giruá. Both cities declared states of emergency due to its effects. Additionally, a state of emergency was declared in Sarandi for strong winds and in Vila Lângaro, Coxilha, and Água Santa for tornadoes. Widespread wind damage in Santa Rosa damaged the roofs of at least 50 people, leading to Civil Defense delivering tarps, tiles, and sweaters. Wind and hail damaged at least 400 buildings in Tupanciretã. Hundreds of thousands of chickens were killed in Água Santa after at least 10 large aviaries were struck by the Coxilha tornado, causing losses in the millions of reals. Community efforts were made to recover wheat and soybean crops which were stored in grain bins affected by the tornado.

=== Surveys ===
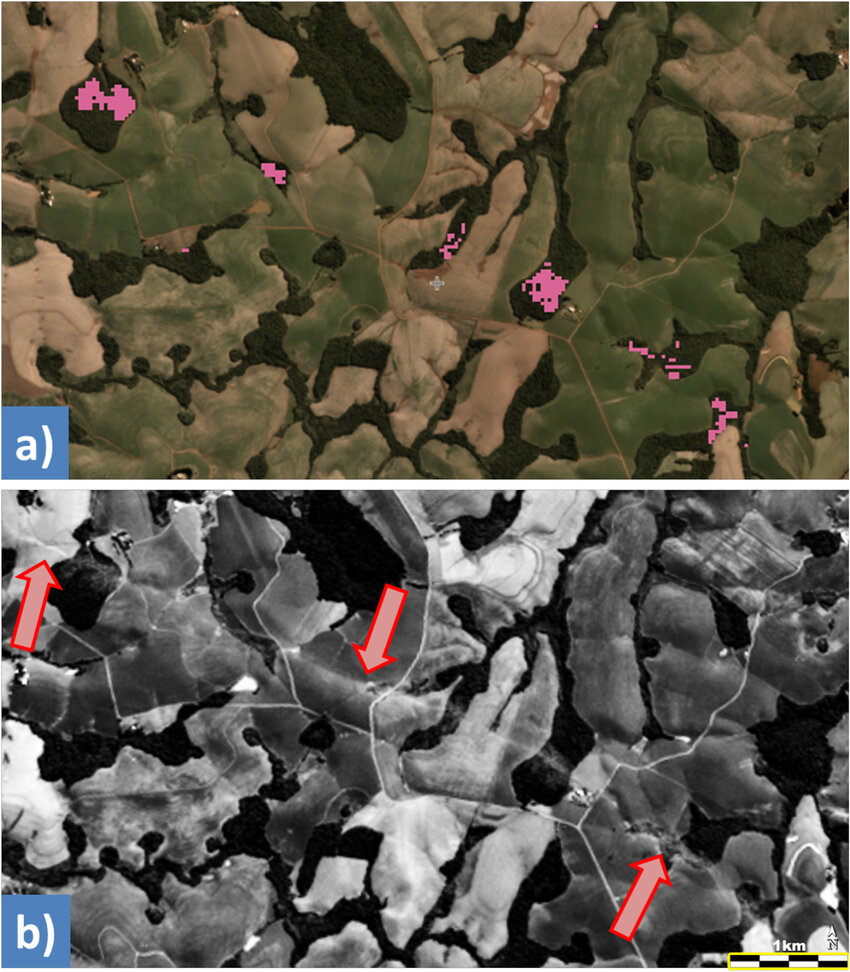
Detection of a tornado damage path north of Pontão, RS. The GFW algorithm detected forest areas of forest loss in pink; reflectivity shows the full tornado path below.

Damage surveys were necessary in order to establish a cause for the damage, as the nocturnal nature of the outbreak resulted in a lack of visual confirmation of tornadoes. However, surveying the damage proved a challenge due to limited resources and the remoteness of affected areas. Nonetheless, surveyors from the Federal University of Santa Maria (UFSM) and Brazil Civil Defense jointly surveyed many areas of damage. Most attention was given to the long-tracked Coxilha tornado, as it was more difficult to survey shorter and weaker tornadoes due to the aforementioned difficulties. The choice to survey damage using the original Fujita Scale rather than the newer Enhanced Fujita Scale was made because of the lack of adaptations to the latter based on Brazilian building codes. Due to limitations with ground surveying, aerial surveying and analysis of satellite imagery were useful in assessing damage and path size. Deforestation detection programs were also helpful in this regard.

Based on their partial damage survey, UFSM researchers assessed the intensity of the Coxilha at F3 strength. However, they warned that their damage analysis may have underestimated the actual intensity of the tornadoes, suggesting that the Coxilha and Sarandi tornadoes—both rated F3—may have been capable of producing violent (F4+) damage. Meanwhile, separate damage analyses by other meteorological organizations, MetSul Meteorologia and PREVOTS, resulted in F4 ratings for the Coxilha tornado.

=== Research ===
Learning algorithms were used to assess forest damage and identify 10 different tornado tracks across Argentina and Brazil (one tornado's path was not detectable due to its brevity and low intensity; it was identified only by video evidence). Many tornadoes were observed on Doppler weather radar, allowing for the observation of phenomena such as tornado debris signatures. Furthermore, this was the first ever cyclic supercell and first ever case of multiple simultaneous supercell tornadoes in South America on record.

== See also ==
- List of South American tornadoes and tornado outbreaks
- List of F4 and EF4 tornadoes (2010–2019)
- Weather of 2018
