= Disagreements on the intensity of tornadoes =

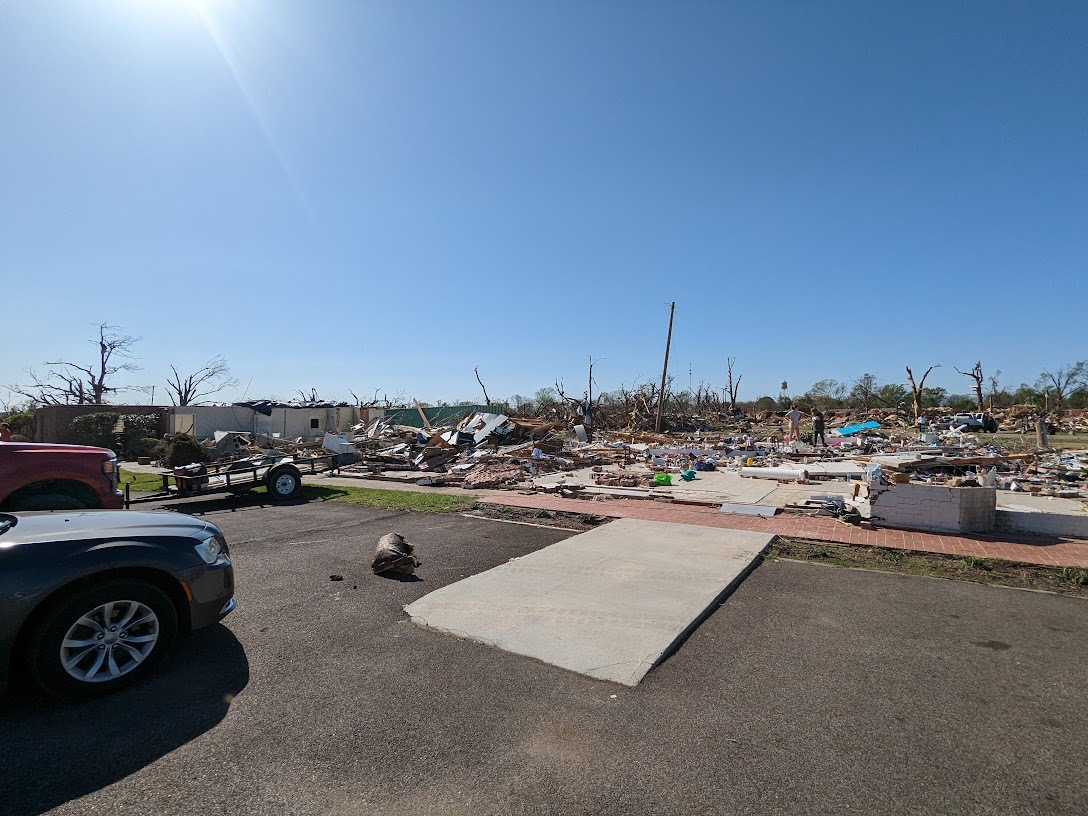
High-end EF4 damage to a shop from the Rolling Fork, Mississippi tornado. An employee of the National Weather Service stated that damage here may have been rated EF5 if more similarly destroyed structures were found nearby.

Since the late 18th century, meteorologists and engineers have worked to assess the intensity of tornadoes, typically through the work of a tornado damage survey or a scientific case study. This work has led to the creation of the Fujita scale (F-scale) in 1971 and the TORRO scale in 1975. However, the original Fujita scale lacked the incorporation of diverse empirical damage to estimate wind speeds, such as construction quality; to address this, the Enhanced Fujita scale (EF-scale) was created in 2007, followed by the International Fujita scale (IF-scale) in 2023. Despite these efforts to help assess the strength of tornadoes, engineers, scientists and academics have disagreed with each other on how strong various tornadoes were. This is a list of notable disagreements on the intensity of a particular tornado.

== Background ==
A diagram illustrating the relationship between the Beaufort, Fujita, and Mach number scales

The Fujita scale was the first method to systematically rate tornadoes based on damage assessment. It linked damage descriptions—like debarked trees or destroyed houses—to a bracket of wind speeds that would have been necessary to cause the damage, assigning each a rating from F0 to F5. This approach to rating tornadoes and concluding their probable wind speeds was revolutionary and was replicated and adapted into the various scales used today.

It is often difficult to distinguish tornadoes in the upper echelons of the Fujita scale as minute details must be analyzed in order to provide an accurate rating. Conversely, tornadoes which leave behind little to no damage can not be accurately represented using damage assessment methods. Tornadoes that happened farther in the past or in regions outside of more tornado-prepared areas will have similar difficulty in receiving an accurate rating due to a dearth of information. The situation is further muddled by the fact that these scales incorporate different types of data, leading to differing ratings based on which scale is used. For example, the International Fujita scale uniquely uses measured wind speeds via Doppler weather radar alongside damage assessment techniques.

== Pre-1950s ==
=== 1931 Lublin tornado ===
On July 20, 1931, a violent tornado struck the city of Lublin in Poland. The damage from the tornado was rated F4 on the Fujita scale by the European Severe Storms Laboratory. The Polish Weather Service estimated that the tornado had winds between 246 to 324 mph (396 to 521 km/h). The lower rating is a result of comparing the damage with modern scales. The older, higher rating was the result of calculating the wind pressure needed to cause the specified damage. This means it was potentially at F5 intensity, as F5 tornadoes begin with winds at 261 mph (420 km/h). But in publication by members of staff of the University of Warsaw and Adam Mickiewicz University in Poland as well as the National Oceanic and Atmospheric Administration in the United States doubts were expressed about this assessment: " ...this estimate is highly uncertain since no typical F5 damage was reported. Instead, F4 damage was plausible".

== 1970s ==
=== Super Outbreak (1974) ===
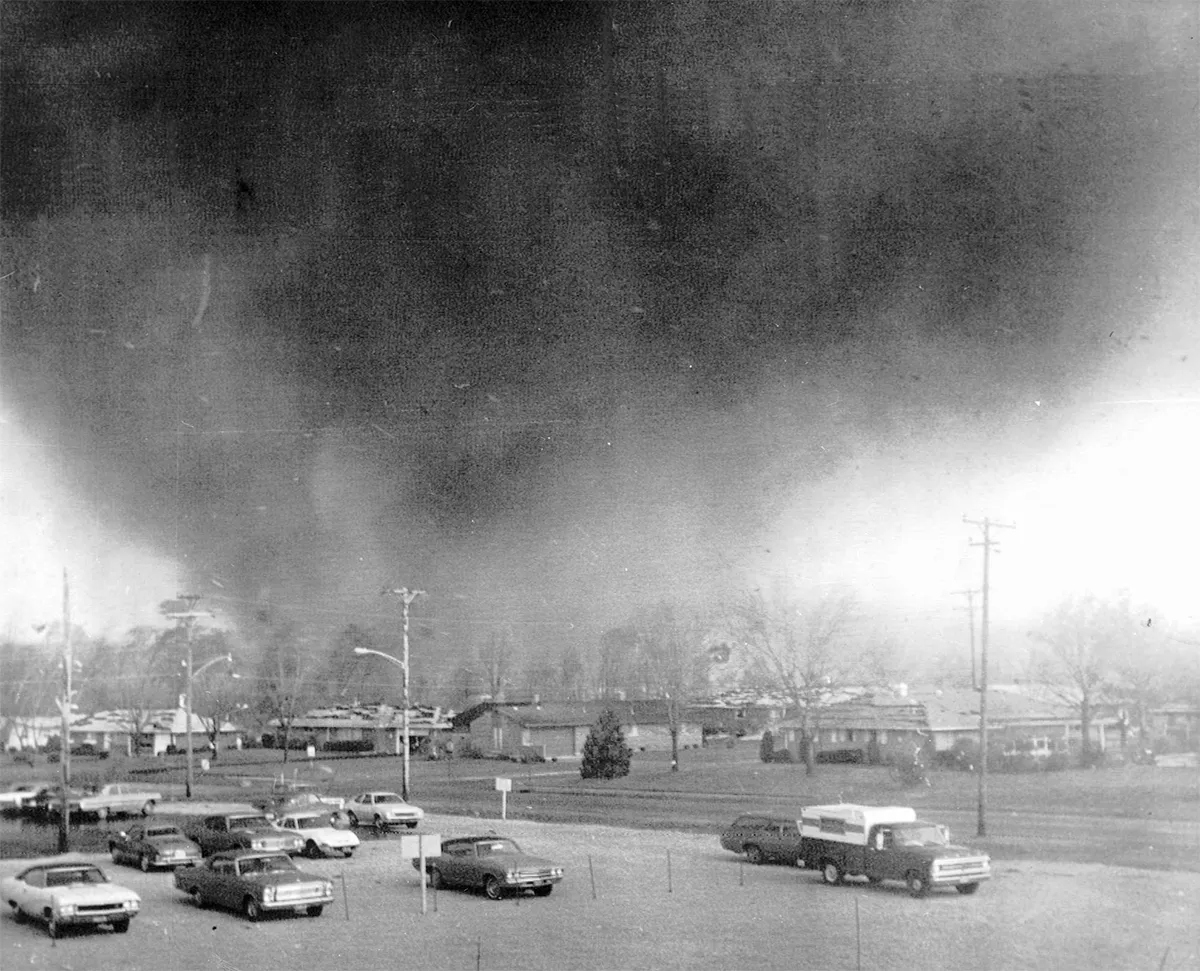
The violent tornado tearing through Xenia

On April 3, 1974, one of the most destructive tornado outbreaks on record would affect much of the United States. This included a violent tornado struck the towns of Xenia and Wilberforce in Ohio. Immediately following the tornado, Dr. Ted Fujita and a team of colleagues from the University of Chicago, University of Oklahoma, and National Severe Storms Laboratory, undertook a 10-month study of the 1974 Super Outbreak. Along with discovering new knowledge about tornadoes, such as downbursts and microbursts, and assessing damage to surrounding structures, the Xenia tornado was determined to be the worst out of 148 storms. Fujita initially assigned a preliminary rating of F6 intensity ± 1 scale. This rating was later officially downgraded by the National Weather Service office in Cincinnati, Ohio (now located in Wilmington, Ohio), which rated the worst of the damage in Xenia F5.

Another violent tornado struck several towns in Lincoln County, Franklin County, and Coffee County in Tennessee. The worst of the damage in Franklin County was rated F5 by the National Weather Service, however, in March 2012, the National Weather Service stated they could not confirm if the United States Weather Bureau ever conducted a damage survey after the tornado. Professor Ted Fujita and several of his graduate students did conduct a damage survey, where they "were unable to locate the reference to 'incredible damage' that results from an F5" rating. After their survey and analysis, Fujita and his students sent a letter to the Storm Prediction Center, recommending the tornado be downgraded to an F4 rating. Following this letter, the National Weather Service downgraded the tornado to an F4 rating.

== 1980s ==
=== Speer–Messer–Golden–Broken Bow, Oklahoma (1982) ===
On April 2, 1982, a large, violent, and at times multiple-vortex tornado traveled from south of Speer, Oklahoma and across the southern tip of Broken Bow before dissipating southeast of Eagletown. At one point it was 1.5 miles (2.4 km) wide. It destroyed 30-40 homes, 30-40 large barns as well as other farm buildings, trailer homes, a church, and a motel. A sign from the motel was carried 30 miles (48 km) and a wooden board was driven into a tree. Twenty-nine people were injured. The NWS officially rated the tornado F5 based on the destruction of a small, newly constructed home near Messer. It was completely swept away with only carpet tack strips left on the foundation. In 1993, Grazulis rated the tornado F4, stating that the home near Messer was poorly anchored, and its destruction may not even indicate F4 intensity. Several ranch homes were leveled, garnering the F4 rating. In his 2023 book, Grazulis listed this tornado as F5, stating that Fujita agreed to an F5 rating "in order to avoid confusion."

== 1990s ==
=== Texas Panhandle tornado outbreak (1995) ===
On June 8, 1995, an extremely severe and localized outbreak of tornadoes occurred in the Texas Panhandle. A violent stovepipe tornado struck the city of Pampa, Texas after touching down to its southwest. Its short path length and lack of damage to structures limited its rating. According to Thomas P. Grazulis, the F4 rating it was given was based on the movement of industrial equipment, as the tornado had weakened significantly by the time it entered more populated areas. Grazulis used photogrammetry to conclude that at about 100 feet above ground level, the tornado had wind speeds in the 200–250 miles per hour, not counting a powerful vertical wind component. Grazulis later discussed the Pampa event in F5-F6 Tornadoes and declared "In my opinion, if there ever was an F6 tornado caught on video, it was the Pampa, Texas tornado of 1995". The same supercell responsible for the Pampa tornado cycled and produced another significant tornado near Hoover, Texas, which was officially rated F2. Narrowly missing the Rufe Jordan Unit prison, this tornado displayed significant strength by stripping asphalt from the local highways.

=== Jarrell, Texas (1997) ===
On May 27, 1997, a devastating tornado struck the outskirts of Jarrell, Texas, where tens of houses were destroyed and 27 people were killed. A damage survey conducted by the National Weather Service resulted in an official rating of F5 for the tornado. However, a team with the National Institute of Standards and Technology argued that the worst damage could be attributed to F3-strength winds due to issues with the construction quality of the affected homes. Overall, they criticized the lack of consideration for construction quality under the Fujita Scale that they claimed resulted in an overestimation of tornadic wind speeds. In conclusion, this tornado stays classified as F5.

== 2000s ==
=== Elie, Manitoba (2007) ===
The tornado approaching the town of Elie, Manitoba

On June 22, 2007, a small but powerful tornado struck the southwestern part of Elie, Manitoba. The next day, a preliminary damage assessment by Environment Canada concluded that out of the four houses destroyed by the tornado, the most damaged house received an F4 rating. While they did initially consider rating the tornado as an F5, the lack of any previous F5-rated tornadoes in Canada resulted in the lower rating. Additionally, the investigators were concerned about the scrutiny they would receive from the media and meteorological community if they rated the tornado an F5, and how they could not confirm whether the extreme damage was a result of the tornado's slow motion. In September 2007, Environment Canada officially upgraded the tornado's rating from F4 to F5 based on video evidence and a second damage survey. The videos showed that not only did the tornado remain over each house for no longer than 30 seconds, but also that it showed how exactly the well-built homes were torn their foundations.

In 2008 at the American Meteorological Society's 24th Conference on Severe Local Storms, Patrick J. McCarthy, along with D. Carlsen and J. Slipec, submitted a paper for and hosted a presentation on the Elie tornado. At the conference, it was presented that some of the damage did point to an F5 rating, however, the survey team was concerned the tornado was weaker than F5 strength, and only caused the extreme damage due to moving slowly, where it could have "relentlessly pounded the houses into a higher level of destruction". After further investigation using video evidence captured by people watching the tornado, the surveyors determined that "the structural failures were quick. The structural assessments indicated that the homes were well-built and generally well-secured. In particular, one of the destroyed homes met all of the requirements for the highest damage rating." The team also noted that the damage would have qualified for an EF5 rating on the Enhanced Fujita scale, which was in use in the United States at the time.

== 2010s ==
=== Super Outbreak (2011) ===
On April 27, 2011, the most large-scale tornado outbreak would devastate much of the southern United States, with five tornadoes having a disputed rating.

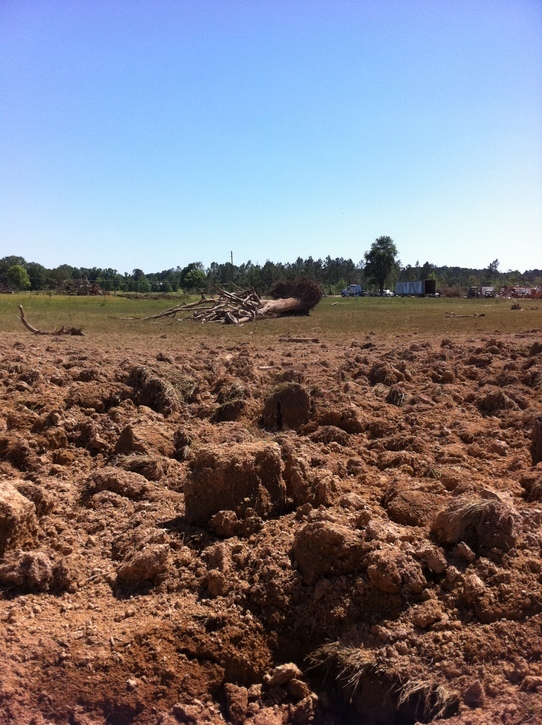
Tremendous ground scouring left behind by the tornado; a large, debarked, and defoliated tree that was ripped out by its roots and thrown can also be seen in the background

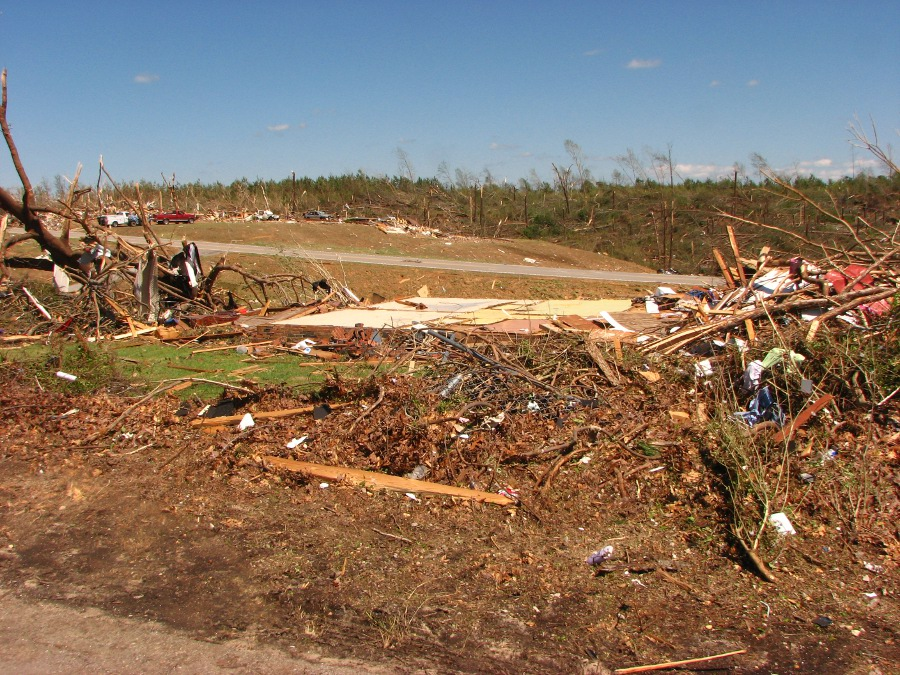
EF5 damage in Phil Campbell, with multiple homes swept away and grass scoured from hillsides

A large and long-lived tornado struck several towns in rural northern Alabama before tearing through the northern suburbs of Huntsville; in particular the towns of Hackleburg, Phil Campbell, and Tanner in Alabama. The National Weather Service offices in Birmingham and Huntsville, Alabama, rated the worst of the damage caused by the tornado EF5 with winds estimated to be at least 210 miles per hour (340 km/h). Nearly two-dozen locations along the tornado's track were rated EF5.

In the AMS paper, researchers stated the justification for the EF5 rating was numerous homes that were swept away, however, only a single home was "bolted to its foundation". The researchers also noted that in Hackleburg, the National Weather Service office in Birmingham, Alabama, used "the tossing of vehicles 150–200 yards (140–180 m) and the wind rowing of debris" as contextual reasons to apply the EF5 rating. The researchers went on to state how "only one home was explicitly noted to have actually been anchored to its foundation", and the only location to warrant an EF5 rating.

Another violent multi-vortex tornado destroyed portions of Tuscaloosa and Birmingham, Alabama, as well as smaller communities and rural areas between the two cities. The National Weather Service office in Birmingham, Alabama rated the worst of the damage caused by the tornado EF4 with winds of at least 190 miles per hour (310 km/h).

The Chastain Manor Apartments, which were nailed, rather than bolted to their foundations, were completely destroyed and partially swept away by the tornado in the outskirts of Tuscaloosa. A well-anchored clubhouse on the property was mostly swept away and its remains were scattered into a pond, even though the structure had lacked interior walls. A nearby manhole cover was removed from its drain and thrown into a ravine. The suburbs of Concord, Pleasant Grove, and McDonald Chapel, along with residential areas in northern Birmingham itself, were also devastated by the tornado. Extensive wind-rowing of debris was noted in Concord and Pleasant Grove, numerous trees were debarked, and some homes were swept away, although much of the debris remained next to the foundations and was not scattered, and most vehicles were not moved more than 15 yards (14 m). As the tornado moved across a coal yard in this area, a 35.8-tonne (78,925 lb) coal car was thrown 391 ft (119 m) through the air.

Three NSF surveyors were in favour of an EF5 rating, whilst three other NSF surveyors, the URS Corporation for FEMA, and meteorologists Jim LaDue, Timothy P. Marshall, and Kevin Scharfenberg writing in a NOAA study instead found damage in favour of an EF4 rating. The structures that were swept away by this tornado were either improperly anchored, lacked interior walls, or were surrounded by contextual damage not consistent with winds exceeding 200 mph (320 km/h), and as a result an EF5 rating could not be applied. Therefore, it was given a final rating of high-end EF4, with winds estimated at 190 mph (310 km/h). President Barack and First Lady Michelle Obama visited Tuscaloosa on April 29, taking a ground tour of some of the affected areas. Obama was quoted as saying that he had "never seen devastation like this."

Another large and violent tornado struck areas of DeKalb County, Alabama and Dade County, Georgia, particularly around the communities of Shiloh, Rainsville, and Henagar. The National Weather Service office in Huntsville, Alabama, rated the worst of the damage EF5 with winds of at least >200 miles per hour (320 km/h), with numerous locations being rated EF5. The National Weather Service rated a "corridor from CR 515 through a neighborhood along County Road 441" as "near EF-5". In that area, numerous one- and two-story homes were leveled to their foundation with debris scattered, cars were thrown large distances, and some sidewalk pavement was pulled up out of the ground by the tornado. "However, some of the homes in this area appeared to be pushed off their foundation initially with limited anchorage. Thus, the damage was deemed high end EF-4 in this area."

Researchers in the AMS paper stated that the justification for the EF5 rating was a single location where a large, two-story brick home that was "blown off of its foundation, with several anchors pulled out of the ground and a 800 pounds (360 kg), anchored safe found 600 feet (180 m) away with its door ripped off."

=== Joplin, Missouri (2011) ===
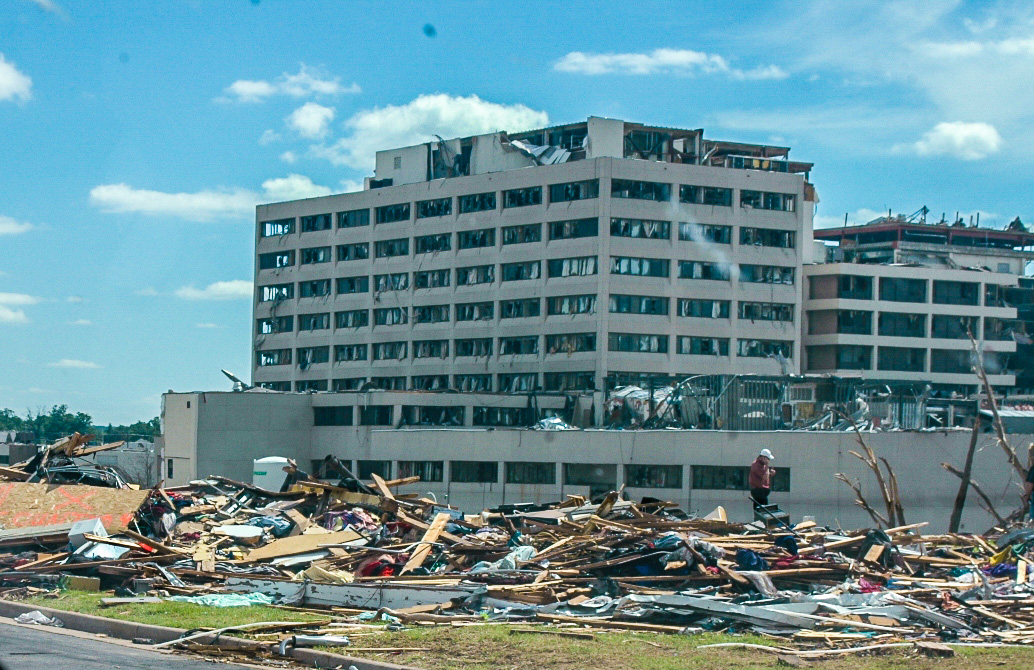
St. John's Regional Medical Center sustained EF5 damage and had to be torn down due to deformation of its foundation and underpinning system

On May 22, 2011, a large and devastating tornado struck the city of Joplin, Missouri. The worst of the damage caused by the tornado was rated EF5 by the National Weather Service Springfield, Missouri (NWS Springfield), four days after the tornado on May 26. According to the National Weather Service:

"The EF-5 rating was mainly arrived at by the total destruction of vehicles of various sizes and weight. Some vehicles were tossed several blocks, and owners were never able to locate their vehicles. Also, parking stops weighing over 300 pounds and re-barred into asphalt were tossed from 20 to 60 yards. Other factors included was the deflection, deformed and tossing of reinforced concrete porches and slabs, and the fact the St. John’s hospital building structure and foundation were compromised and will need to be torn down, were probably caused by winds speed at or exceeding 200 mph."

— National Weather Service Springfield, Missouri

In 2013, the American Society of Civil Engineers published a study disputing the tornado's initial EF5 rating, based on surveying damage on over 150 structures within a six-mile segment of the storm's path. According to the report, over 83% of the damage was caused by wind speeds of 135 mph (217 km/h) or less, the maximum wind speed of an EF2 tornado. An additional 13% was caused by EF3 wind speeds, and 3% was consistent with EF4 winds. The study found no damage consistent with wind speeds over 200 mph (320 km/h), the minimum threshold of an EF5 tornado.

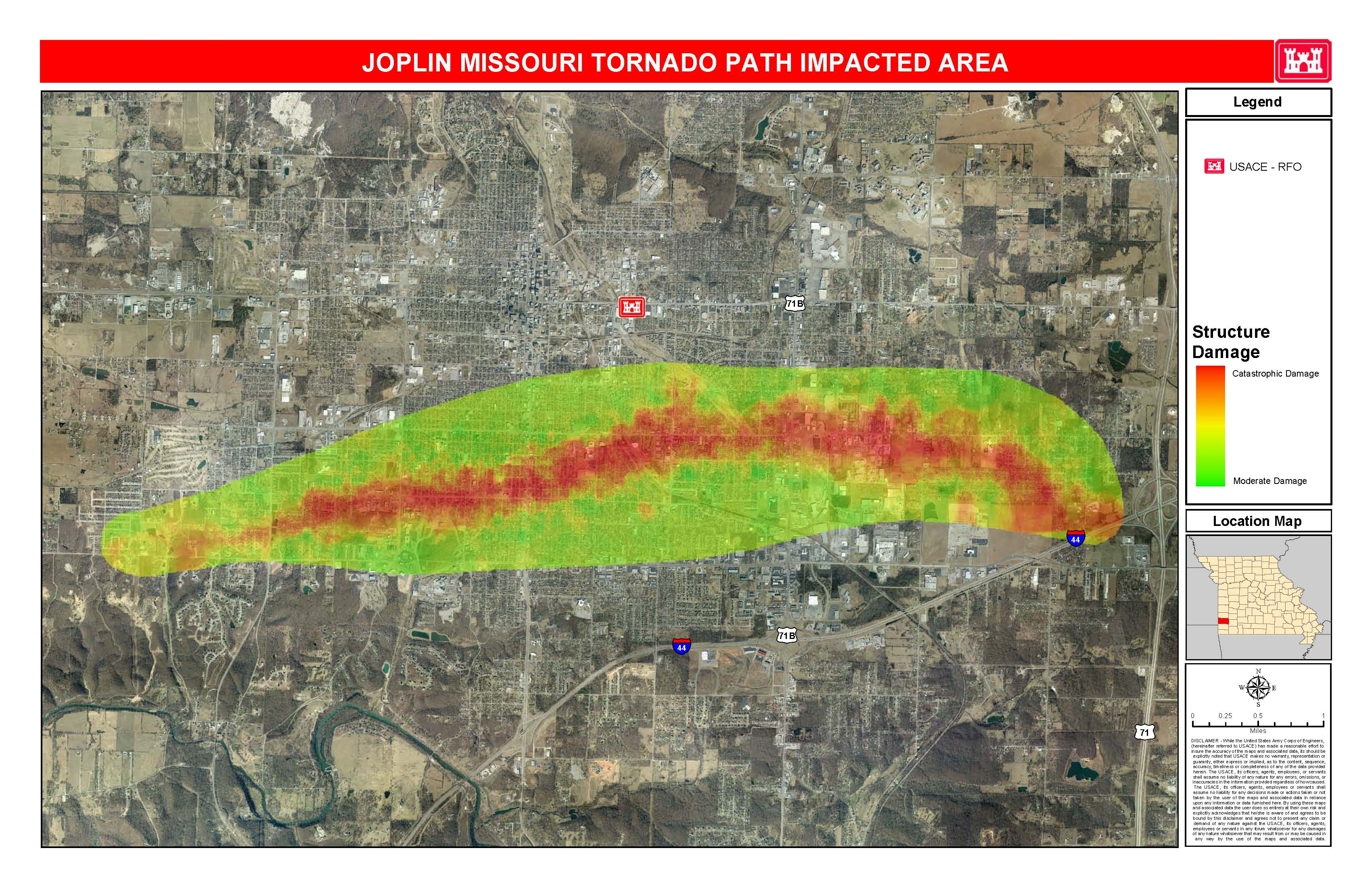
A United States Army Corps of Engineers map shows the tornado's damage path as it moved nearly due east through Joplin, with the most intense damage near its centerline

However, the EF5 rating stood. The NWS office in Springfield stated that their survey teams found only a small area of EF5 structural damage, and that it could have easily been missed in the survey (at and around St. John's Medical Center). Bill Davis, head of Springfield's NWS office, said that the results of the study "do not surprise me at all," adding that "there was only a very small area of EF5 damage in Joplin...we knew right off the bat there was EF4 damage. It took us longer to identify the EF5 damage and that it would take winds of over 200 mph (320 km/h) to do that damage." Additionally, the basis for the EF5 rating in Joplin was mainly contextual rather than structural, with non-conventional damage indicators such as the removal of concrete parking stops, manhole covers, reinforced concrete porches, driveways, and asphalt used to arrive at a final rating. The presence of wind rowed structural debris, instances of very large vehicles such as buses, vans, and semi-trucks being thrown hundreds of yards to several blocks from their points of origin, the fact that some homeowners never located their vehicles, and the overwhelming extent and totality of the destruction in Joplin were also taken into consideration.

According to a detailed damage survey by Timothy P. Marshall, a majority of houses were destroyed at winds of EF2-3 strength. However he identified 22 well anchored houses which were assigned EF5 ratings.

The researchers stated in the AMS paper that the justification for the tornado's EF5 rating was initially 22 homes that were completely swept away, with only the concrete slab remaining. The paper then stated the aforementioned study by the ASCE which "found none of these to actually be EF5". It is then noted a 2012 study published by Christopher D. Karstens, Timothy P. Marshall, and two others which stated, "that the movement of parking stops likely justifies keeping the rating."

=== El Reno–Piedmont, Oklahoma (2011) ===
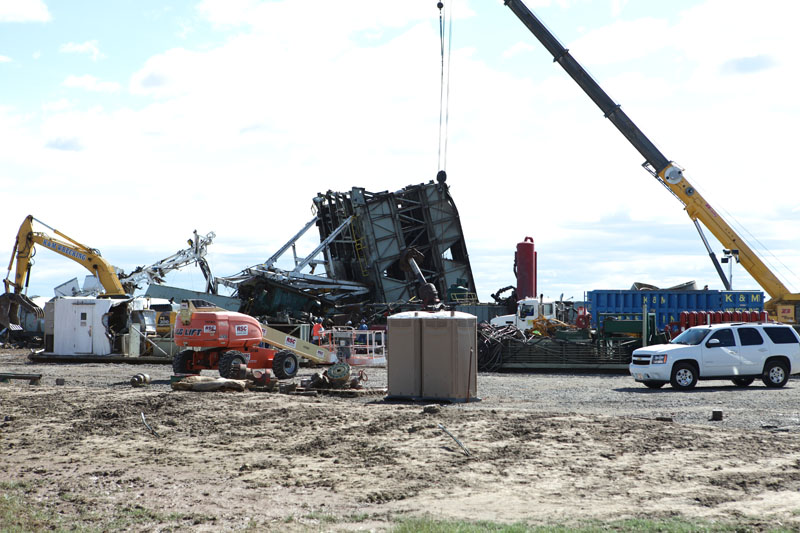
Damage at the Cactus 117 oil drilling rig near El Reno, showing the mangled and overturned rig

On May 24, 2011, a long-track and extremely powerful tornado struck the areas near or within the communities of El Reno, Piedmont, and Guthrie. Not long after touching down, the tornado struck the Cactus 117 oil drilling rig site, completely destroying it. When it hit, the rig's pipes and drill head were inserted deep in the well's borehole, which provided the drilling pipe with 200,000 lb (91,000 kg) of downforce. Despite this, and despite the fact that the drilling rig weighed 862 metric tons—or almost two million pounds—the rig was toppled onto its side and rolled several times. The well's blowout preventer was left bent at a 30-degree angle to the north. Elsewhere on the site, vehicles and cargo containers were lofted into the air and tossed. Twelve workers were on the site when the tornado struck, and took shelter in the site's change house (a steel container serving as a locker room). Tied down by four steel cables anchored 5.5 feet (1.7 m) deep in the ground, the container was pummeled with debris. One cable broke and the container was dented, but all twelve workers survived without serious injury.

Despite not being an official damage indicator on the Enhanced Fujita scale, the National Weather Service Norman, Oklahoma rated the damage to the Cactus 117 oil drilling rig EF5 with winds of at least 210 miles per hour (340 km/h); the only damage caused by the tornado to receive an EF5 rating.

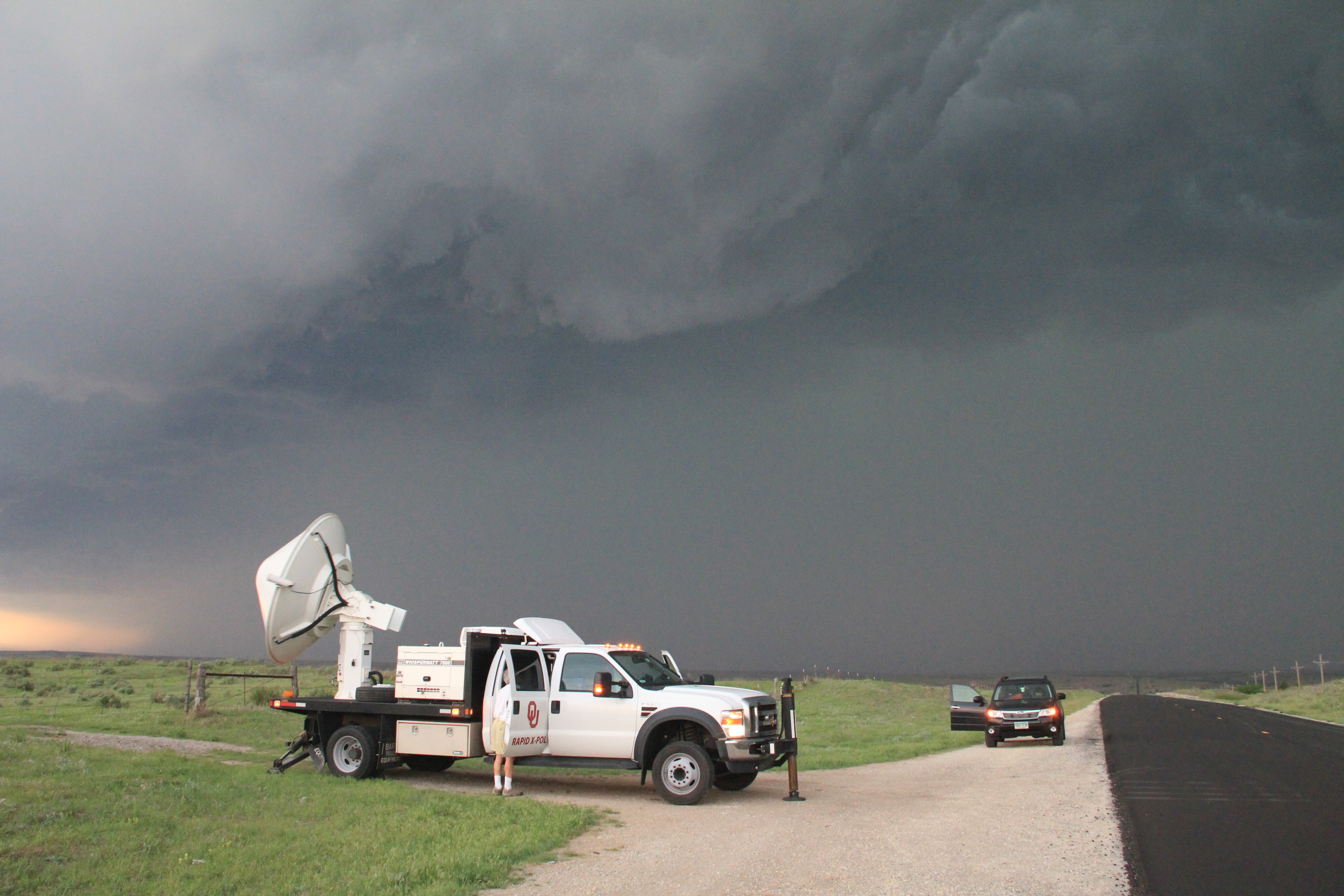
The RaXPol mobile Doppler radar, shown here scanning a severe thunderstorm in Oklahoma in 2013

Prior to striking the oil drilling rig, the tornado was being monitored by a truck-mounted Rapid-Scan X-band Polarimetric (RaXPol) mobile Doppler weather radar, operated by the University of Oklahoma's Advanced Radar Research Center (ARRC) led by Howard Bluestein. That radar, stationed near the intersection of Smith Road and Walbaum Road less than two miles (3.2 km) south of I-40, captured the "first polarimetric, rapid-scan, mobile Doppler weather radar dataset of an EF-5 tornado." As the tornado moved towards I-40 to the southeast of the RaXPol radar, it detected some of the fastest wind speeds ever measured on the planet. Interpretations slightly differ: the maximum instantaneous radial velocity sampled by the radar was originally reported as having been 124.8 m/s (279 mph), measured 200–230 feet (60–70 m) above the ground at 4:00:26 p.m.; however, the maximum velocity was later reported as having been 132.1 m/s (295 mph) measured ~72 feet (22 m) "above radar level" at 4:00:39 p.m. in a 2014 paper by Bluestein et al. on the use of radar data for tornado ratings. Maximum radial velocities were also reported to have remained "greater than 120.0 m/s (268 mph) for several minutes." Additionally, multiple consecutive radar scans were averaged to yield an estimated 2-second average radial velocity of 118.4 m/s (265 mph) and an estimated 4-second average velocity of 110.8 m/s (248 mph). This was reported as "likely to be an underestimate of the true 2- and 4-s average wind speeds."

The instantaneous velocity readings taken are not directly equivalent to the three-second gust at 33 feet (10 m) that the Enhanced Fujita scale attempts to estimate, but they mark the second-highest wind speed ever recorded in a tornado, after wind speeds of approximately 135 m/s (300 mph) were recorded in both the 1999 Bridge Creek–Moore tornado and a sub-vortex within the 2013 El Reno tornado. Where the most intense winds are generally present in a tornado is an unresolved question, but the limited existing research suggests that wind speeds are likely to be highest closer to the ground.

=== Moore, Oklahoma (2013) ===
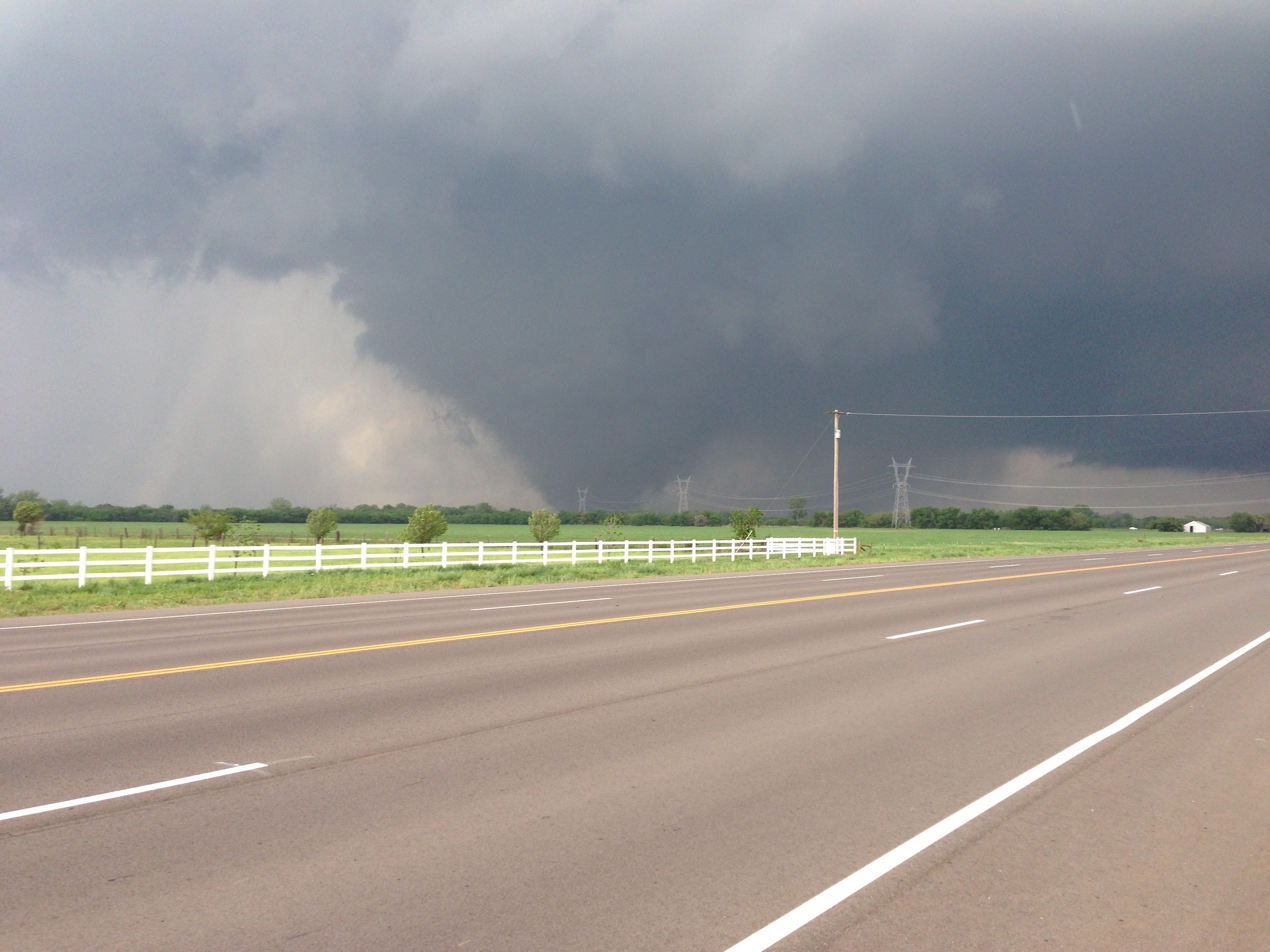
The tornado as it was approaching the city of Moore

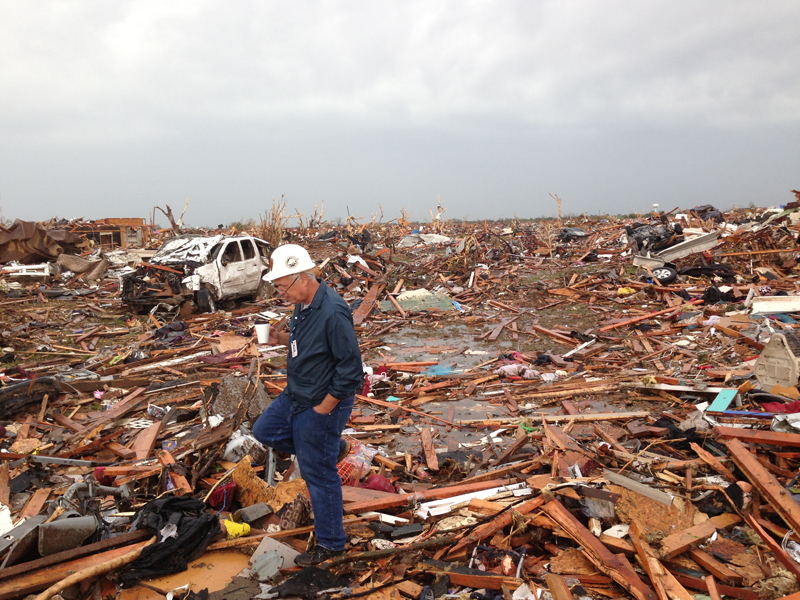
Meteorologist Tim Marshall surveys a neighborhood that was devastated

On May 20, 2013, a large and violent tornado struck Moore, Oklahoma and surrounding areas. Less than 24 hours after the tornado, on May 21 at 1:10 PM CDT, the National Weather Service Norman, Oklahoma (NWS Norman), rated the tornado EF4 with winds of at least 190 miles per hour (310 km/h). At 2:50 PM CDT, less than 24 hours since the tornado had touched down, the NWS Norman upgraded the tornado's rating to EF5 with winds of 200–210 miles per hour (320–340 km/h). Shortly after the tornado, the Associated Press stated that the power of the Moore tornado "dwarfs" the atomic bombing of Hiroshima by "8 times to more than 600 times".

Prior to hitting Moore, the tornado struck the Orr Family Farm and the Celestial Acres horse training area. Every building at Celestial Acres was either leveled or swept away at EF4 intensity, the ground on the property was scoured to bare soil, debris from structures was granulated, and vehicles were thrown and stripped down to their frames. Surveyors noted that based on the contextual damage, the tornado was likely at EF5 intensity in this area, though the construction quality of the affected buildings only permitted an EF4 rating.

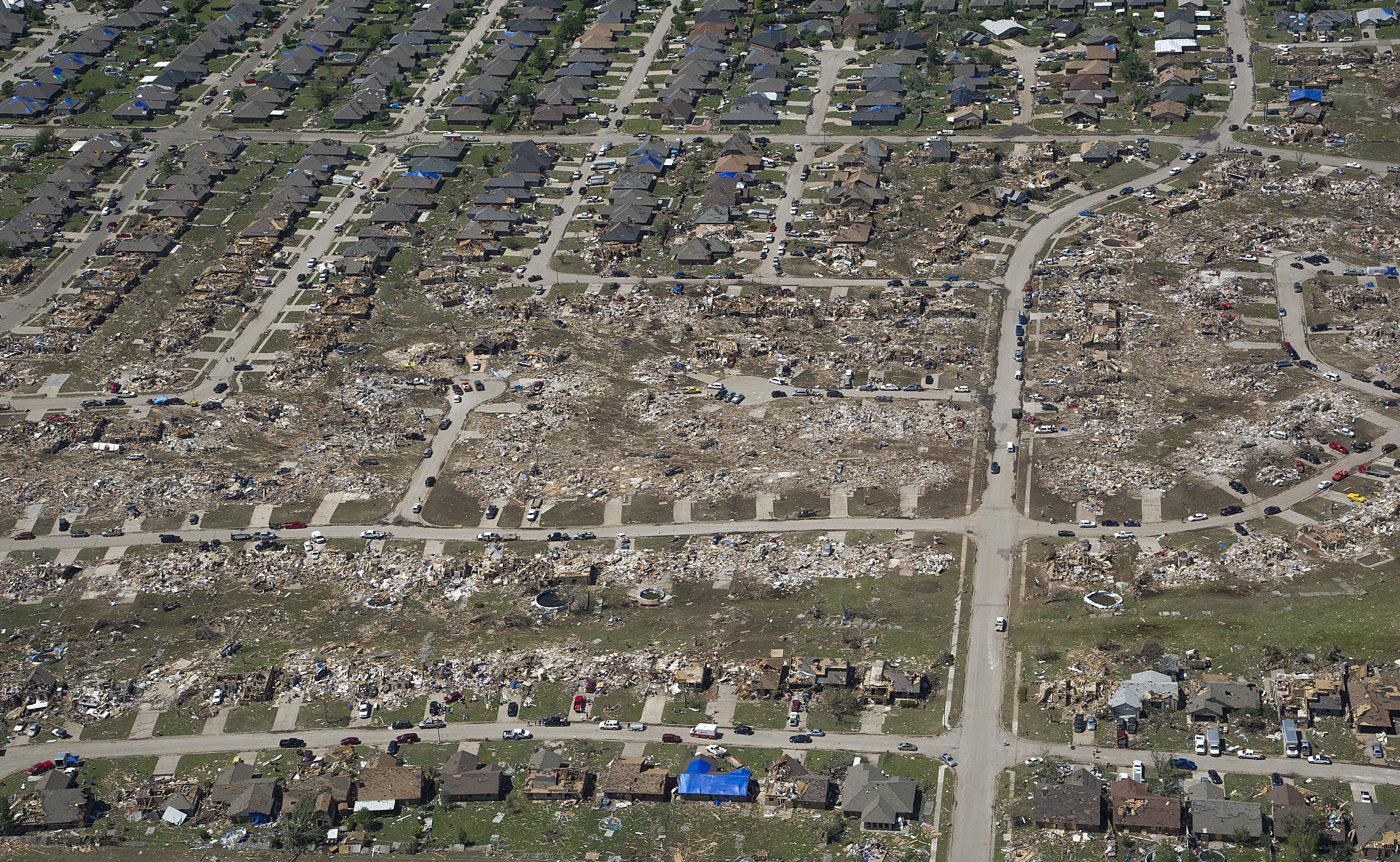
An aerial view of destroyed homes in Moore, taken by the Oklahoma National Guard

The tornado then heavily scoured an open grassy field before impacting Briarwood Elementary School, which was completely destroyed. The NWS Norman originally rated this damage EF5, but further evaluation and a 2014 study published by the American Meteorological Society revealed evidence of poor construction at the school, and the rating was downgraded to EF4. Two 12,000-gallon water tanks that were also swept off of the Orr Family Farm grounds were thrown into this area; the roof of Briarwood Elementary was struck by one of them − potentially aiding in compromising the building's structural integrity as it bent the steel girders that held up the roof − shortly before the main vortex struck the building, while the other fell onto and destroyed a home a few blocks east of the school.

As the tornado entered western Moore, an anchor-bolted home that was reduced to a bare slab in this area was initially rated EF5 by the NWS Norman, but was later downgraded to EF4 as closer inspection of the foundation revealed that the anchor bolts were missing their nuts and washers. The tornado then destroyed Plaza Towers Elementary School at EF4 intensity, where seven children were killed when a cinder block wall collapsed on top of them. More than a dozen homes in a subdivision just to the south of Plaza Towers Elementary were swept cleanly away, though they were revealed to have been nailed rather than bolted to their foundations, and damage to this subdivision was subsequently rated EF4, though the tornado was likely violent as lawns in this area were completely scoured down to bare soil.

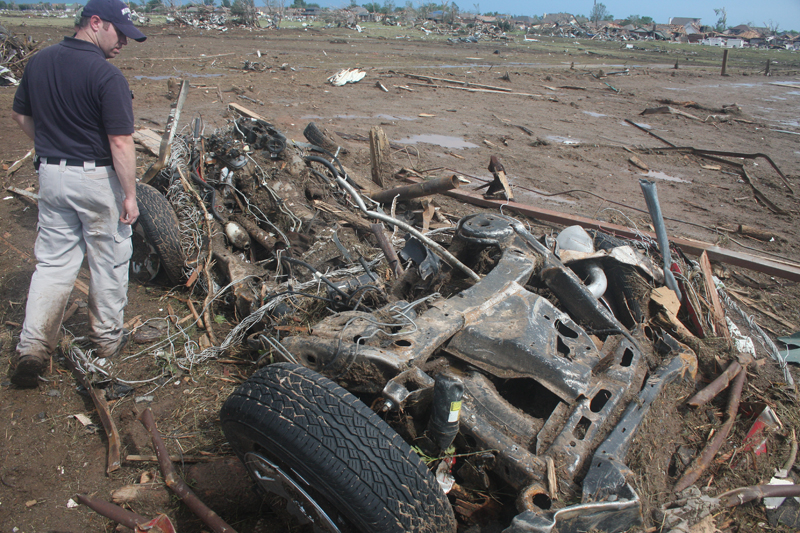
Extreme vehicle damage and ground scouring at the Celestial Acres horse training area

A preliminary study of Briarwood Elementary School conducted in September 2013 by a group of structural engineers found some structural deficiencies that led to its collapse during the tornado. Chris Ramseyer, a structural engineer and an associate professor at the University of Oklahoma determined that the building's walls that were not reinforced with concrete, there had been a lack of connection between the masonry walls and support beams in several portions of the building, and anchor bolts were pulled from the ground by the tornado. Another engineer that was involved in the study stated that the deficiencies that Ramseyer pointed out were not uncommon building practices at the time, and that current building code standards would not ensure that Briarwood would have withstood winds in excess of 200 miles per hour (320 km/h).

=== El Reno, Oklahoma (2013) ===
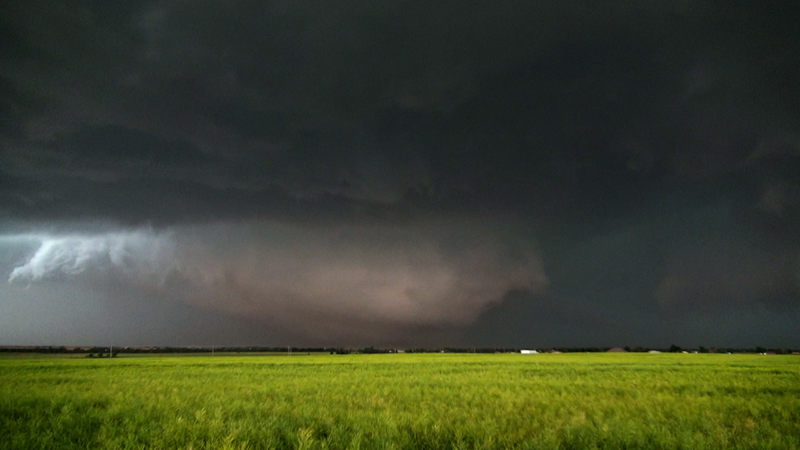
View of the tornado as it was nearing peak strength

Video of several sub-vortices within the tornado

On May 31, 2013, an extremely large, powerful, and erratic tornado struck around El Reno, Oklahoma. The tornado grew to an unprecedented width of 2.6 miles (4.2 km), becoming the officially widest-known tornado ever recorded in history. The intensity of the tornado has been a subject of internal debate within the National Oceanic and Atmospheric Administration. The agency uses the Enhanced Fujita Scale to rate and assess tornado intensity based on the damage left behind. This excludes the use of supplementary measurements, such as those from mobile radar, in concluding a tornado's intensity. Initially receiving an official EF3 rating based on damage, the El Reno tornado was subsequently upgraded to a radar-estimated EF5 rating, the highest on the scale, based on data from a mobile radar. The University of Oklahoma's RaXPol mobile Doppler weather radar, positioned at a nearby overpass, measured winds preliminarily analyzed as in excess of 296 mph (476 km/h). These winds are considered the second-highest ever measured worldwide, just shy of the 321 mph (517 km/h) recorded during the 1999 Bridge Creek–Moore tornado.

Revised RaXPol analysis found winds of 302 ± 34 mph (486 ± 55 km/h) well above ground level and ≥291 mph (468 km/h) below 10 m (33 ft), with some subvortices moving at 175 mph (282 km/h). The strongest winds occurred in small subvortices along the south side of the main vortex. The two most intense vortices occurred north and east of the intersection of 10th Street and Radio Road, about 3 miles (4.8 km) southeast of El Reno. The main funnel is believed to have had radar-estimated EF4 winds, with wind speeds around 185 mph (298 km/h). Radar-estimated EF5 winds were only found aloft and in the smaller vortices that revolved around this funnel at 110 mph (180 km/h). A revised analysis in 2015 revealed a peak wind of 313 mph (504 km/h). In March 2024, NOAA and OU published a new analysis, which estimated that winds may have reached up to anywhere between 115–150 m/s (257–336 mph; 414–540 km/h).

Rick Smith, the warning coordination meteorologist at the National Weather Service Weather Forecast Office in Norman, stated that this tornado was among a "super-rare" category within the EF5 rating. Smith also stated that it was fortunate the tornado did not track into more densely populated areas, particularly those within the Oklahoma City metropolitan area, "this would have been … I don't even want to imagine what it would have been." William Hooke, a senior policy fellow at the American Meteorological Society stated that, "[Oklahoma City] dodged a bullet...You lay that path over Oklahoma City, and you have devastation of biblical proportions."

On August 30, the National Weather Service office in Norman once again revised the intensity of the El Reno tornado. Keli Pirtle, a Public Affairs worker at the National Oceanic and Atmospheric Administration, stated that, "despite the radar-measured wind speeds, the survey team did not find damage that would support a rating higher than EF3. While the wind measurements from the mobile radars are considered reliable, NWS policy for determining EF-ratings is based on surveys of ground damage." The lack of EF5 damage was likely a result of the rural nature of the area, as the sub-vortices that contained the EF5 wind speeds did not impact any structures.

=== Mayflower–Vilonia, Arkansas (2014) ===
On April 27, 2014, a large and destructive tornado struck towns of Paron, Mayflower, Lake Conway, Vilonia and El Paso in Arkansas. The National Weather Service rated the worst of the damage caused by the tornado EF4 with winds of at least 190 miles per hour (310 km/h). The final rating of the tornado was a source of controversy, and the National Weather Service office in Little Rock, Arkansas, noted that if this tornado occurred prior to the change to the Enhanced Fujita Scale in 2007, it likely would have been rated as an F5 due to numerous homes being swept clean from their foundations. However, it was revealed that almost every home in Vilonia lacked anchor bolts and were anchored with cut nails instead. The new scale accounts for homes that use cut nails instead of anchor bolts, which do not effectively provide resistance against violent tornadoes.

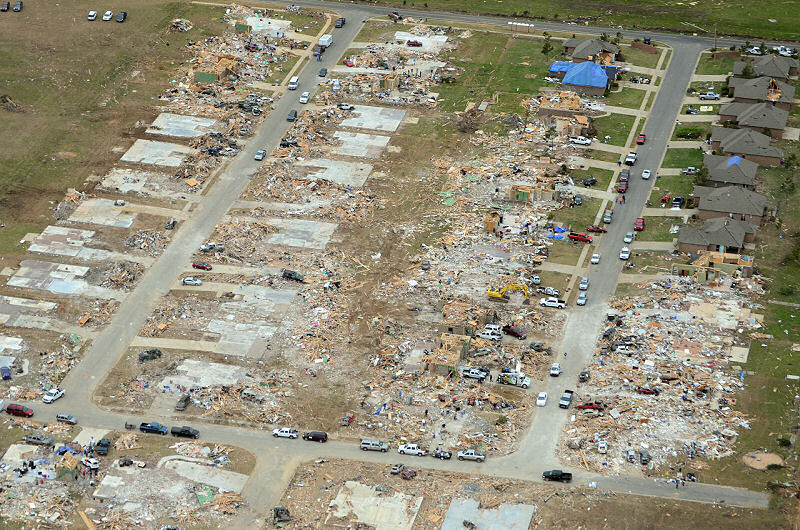
Aerial view of high-end EF4 damage in Vilonia

The final decision on an EF4 rating was based on this as well. However, meteorologist, structural and forensic engineer Timothy P. Marshall noted in his survey of the damage that the rating assigned was "lower bound", and despite the presence of construction flaws, this doesn't rule out "the possibility that EF5 winds could have occurred." Further inspection from surveyors revealed that one home that was swept away along E Wicker St. was indeed properly bolted to its foundation. However, an inspection of the context surrounding the house revealed that small trees in a ditch near the home were still standing, and that the residence had possibly been pummeled by heavy debris from downtown Vilonia, exacerbating the level of destruction.

Researchers for AMS stated the tornado in Vilonia was an "EF5 candidate".

=== Coxilha, Brazil (2018) ===
On the early morning of June 12, 2018, a strong tornado affected several rural municipalities of Rio Grande do Sul, Brazil. In Coxilha, several large trucks weighing multiple tons were overturned and one truck weighing 14 metric tons (31,000 lb) was thrown tens of meters into a nearby field and destroyed. Trees were extensively debarked and stubbed, and several structures were completely collapsed. An incomplete damage survey conducted by the Federal University of Santa Maria gave the tornado a final rating of F3, adding that this tornado may have been capable of causing F4+ damage. However, damage analyses by other meteorological organizations, such as MetSul Meteorologia and PREVOTS, directly rated the tornado F4.

=== Greenwood Springs, Mississippi (2019) ===
On April 13, 2019, a strong tornado struck near the towns of Greenwood Springs and Smithville in Mississippi. The National Weather Service office in Memphis, Tennessee rated the EF2. In July 2022, researchers with the University of Oklahoma, the National Severe Storms Laboratory, and the University of Alabama in Huntsville, published a paper with the American Meteorological Society, where they noted "this tornado produced forest devastation and electrical infrastructure damage up to at least EF4 intensity". Near the end of the report, it was stated that this was "a violent tornado, potentially even EF5 intensity."

== 2020s ==
=== Scarth, Manitoba (2020) ===
On August 7, 2020, a tornado struck in southern Manitoba, passing near the towns of Virden and Scarth. Damage by the tornado was rated (C)EF3 (Note: Canada uses a different version of the Enhanced Fujita scale, which is still commonly called the "EF-scale". The Canadian version of the scale is officially known as the "Canadian Enhanced Fujita scale" or "CEF-scale".) by the Northern Tornadoes Project on August 8.

On August 1, 2024, four professors at the University of Western Ontario and employees of the Northern Tornadoes Project, published a paper through the American Meteorological Society where they analyzed two vehicles thrown by the tornado. The researchers determined that the vehicles have to have been picked up at least 1 metre (1.1 yd) vertically in the air and they were thrown 30 to 100 metres (33 to 109 yd) horizontally once picked up. This would have required the tornado to have had winds of at least 110 m/s (250 mph), which the researchers noted was well above the criteria for an EF5 tornado. At the end of the analysis, the researchers stated, "the lofting wind speeds given by this model are much higher than the rating based on the ground survey EF-scale assessment. This may be due to the current tendency to bias strong EF5 tornadoes lower than reality, or limitations in conventional EF-scale assessments".

=== Western Kentucky (2021) ===
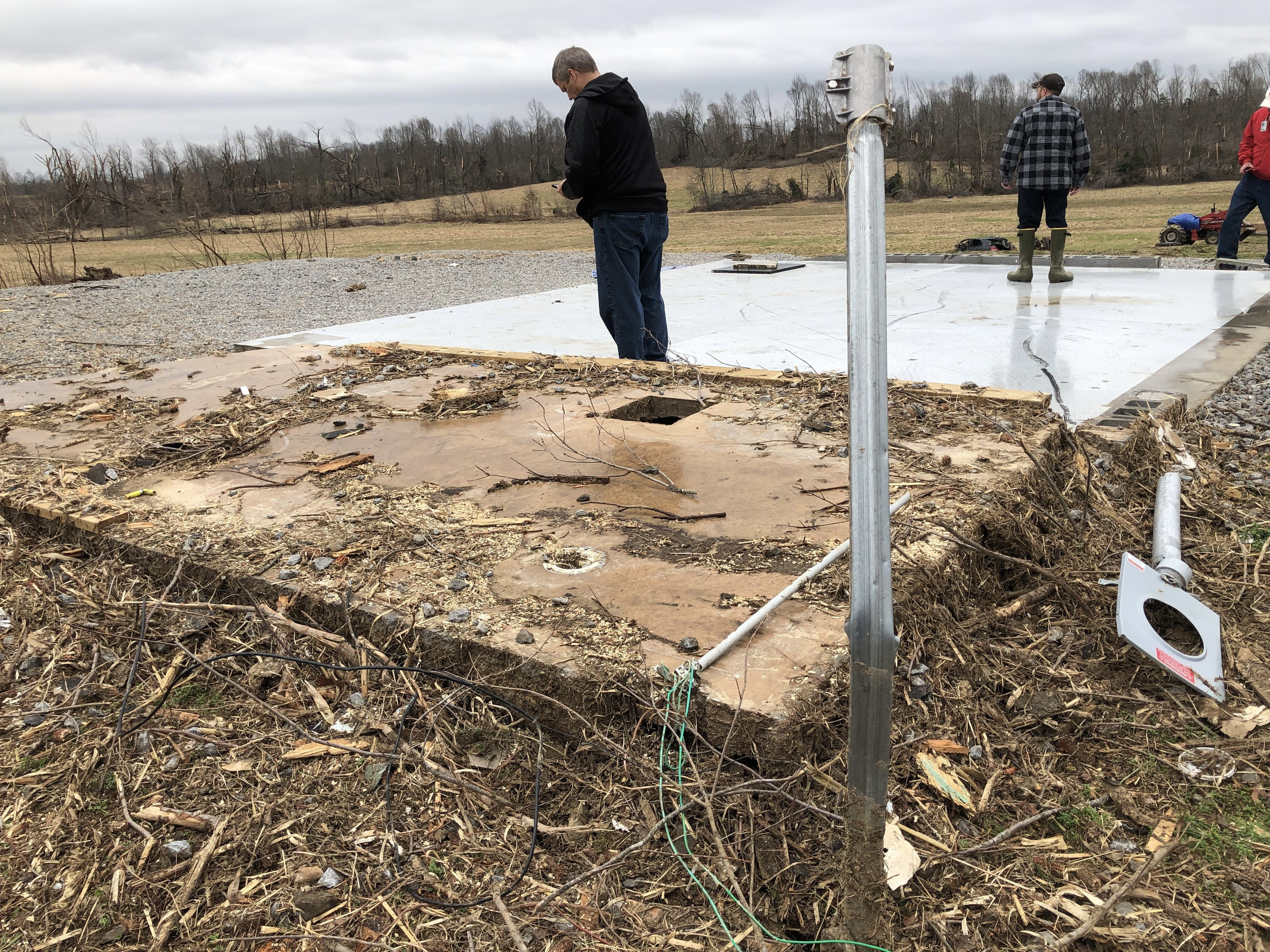
The highest-rated damage from the tornado; a house completely leveled in Bremen

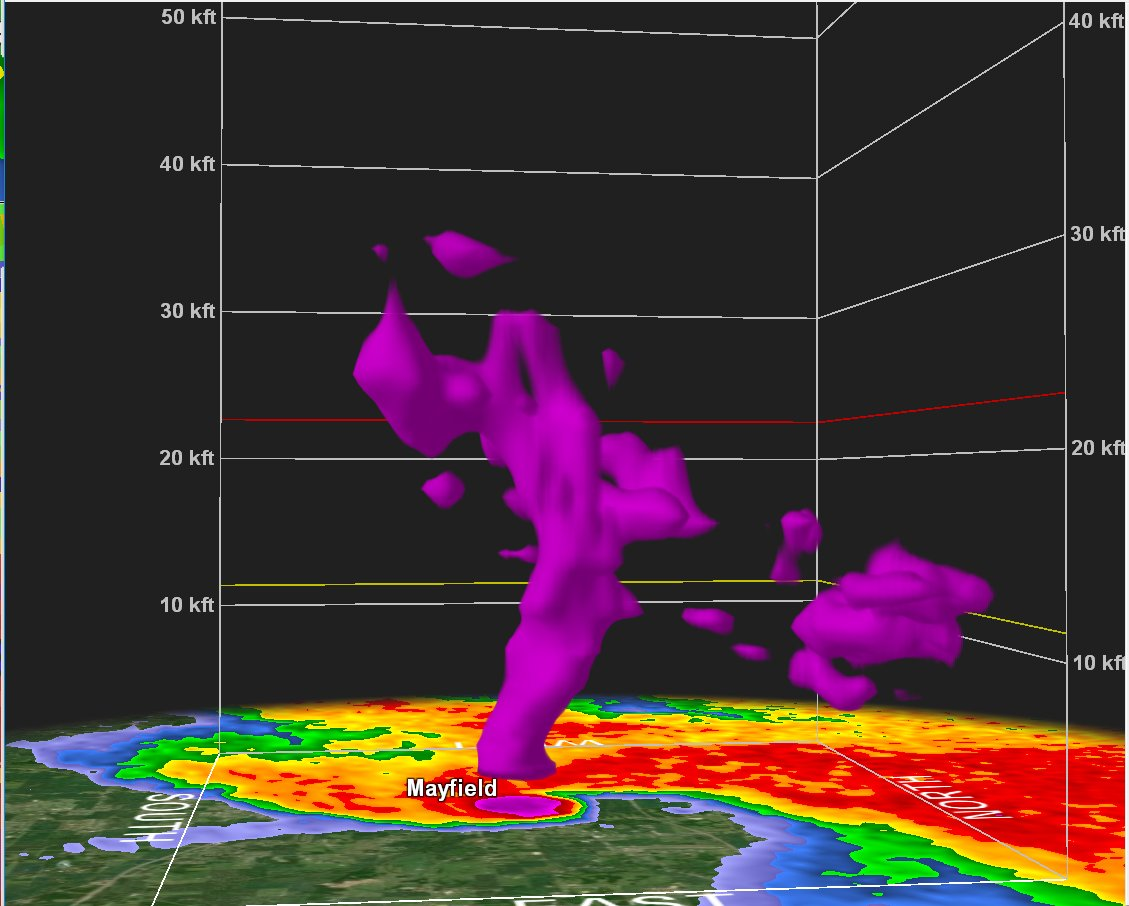
Radar 3D volume scan of the supercell showing debris lofted over 30,000 feet (9.1 km) in the air as the tornado struck Mayfield

On December 10, 2021, a deadly and violent tornado struck Western Kentucky, particularly the towns of Mayfield, Princeton, Dawson Springs, and Bremen. On December 16, the National Weather Service (NWS) office in Paducah, Kentucky rated the tornado EF4 with winds of 188 miles per hour (303 km/h) in the city of Mayfield, Kentucky and 190 miles per hour (310 km/h) in the town of Bremen, Kentucky. Following the rating being released, Gregory Meffert, the lead forecaster at the NWS Paducah stated, "it is not out of the question that at some point in time in the future that this could be upgraded to a five".

In 2022, Timothy Marshall, a meteorologist, structural and forensic engineer; Zachary B. Wienhoff, with Haag Engineering Company; Christine L. Wielgos, a meteorologist at the National Weather Service of Paducah; and Brian E. Smith, a meteorologist at the National Weather Service of Omaha, published a damage survey of portions of the tornado's track, particularly through Mayfield and Dawson Springs. The report notes: "the tornado damage rating might have been higher had more wind resistant structures been encountered. Also, the fast forward speed of the tornado had little 'dwell' time of strong winds over a building and thus, the damage likely would have been more severe if the tornado were slower." Marshall later stated in 2023 that the Western Kentucky tornado was "the closest to EF5 that I can remember" since the Moore EF5 of 2013. Marshall also stated some of the buildings struck by the strongest winds "were horribly constructed and could not resist 100 or even 150 mph wind let alone 200 mph", meaning it was "impossible to know if EF5 winds affected them".

In the AMS paper, researchers stated that the tornado's damage inside Mayfield was an "EF5 candidate".

=== Didsbury, Alberta (2023) ===
On July 1, 2023, a violent (C)EF4 tornado, struck the rural Mountain View County in Alberta, Canada, causing damage particularly between the towns of Didsbury and Carstairs. On July 4, the Environment and Climate Change Canada (ECCC), the Prairie and Arctic Storm Prediction Centre (PASPC), and the Northern Tornadoes Project (NTP) published a joint-damage survey, rating the tornado low-end EF4 with winds of 275 kilometres per hour (171 mph). This rating was based on major damage at a farmstead, where a well-built house was completely leveled with debris scattered across nearby fields. A large 22,000-pound (10,000 kg) combine near this home was thrown 50 m (160 ft) before being rolled a further 50 to 100 m (160 to 330 ft), however, the combine was unable to be used in the rating of the tornado.

On August 1, 2024, four professors at the University of Western Ontario and employees of the Northern Tornadoes Project, published a paper through the American Meteorological Society where they determined the combine harvester was likely lofted roughly 1.26 m (1.38 yd) into the air, with median estimated winds of 118 m/s (260 mph) being needed to lift and thrown the combine. At the end of the analysis, the researchers stated, "the lofting wind speeds given by this model are much higher than the rating based on the ground survey EF-scale assessment. This may be due to the current tendency to bias strong EF5 tornadoes lower than reality, or limitations in conventional EF-scale assessments".

=== Greenfield, Iowa (2024) ===
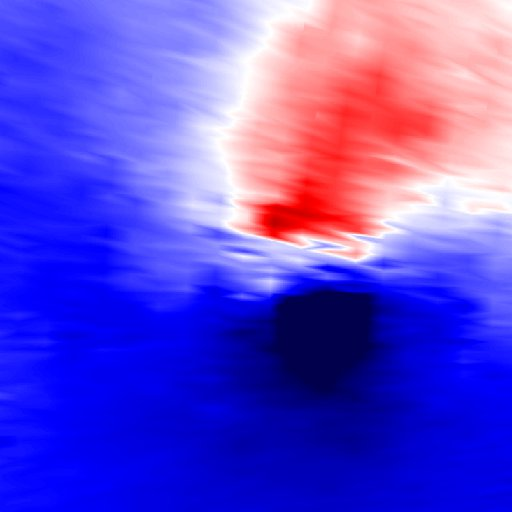
Raw DOW7 imagery of the Greenfield tornado's ground-adjusted wind speeds at 3:41:08 p.m. at peak intensity

On May 21, 2024, a violent and destructive tornado struck the communities of Villisca, Nodaway, Brooks, Corning, and Greenfield in southwestern Iowa. On May 23, the National Weather Service office in Des Moines, Iowa, rated the tornado EF4 with estimated winds between 175–185 miles per hour (282–298 km/h). This was later revised up to 185 miles per hour (298 km/h).

On the day of the tornado, the Doppler on Wheels (DOW) team made a very preliminary analysis, suggesting a Doppler on Wheels measured winds of at least 90 m/s (200 mph). The next day, a further preliminary analysis by the DOW team determined that a Doppler on Wheels measured winds of at least >250 mph (400 km/h), "possibly as high as 290 mph (470 km/h)" at 48 yards (44 m) above the surface, as the tornado moved through the town. Pieter Groenemeijer, the director of the European Severe Storms Laboratory noted that "on the IF-scale, 250 mph measured below 60 m above ground level is IF4 on the IF-scale, 290 mph is IF5."

On June 24, after further analysis, the report was revised to winds of 308–319 mph (496–513 km/h) in a brief 1 second gust, based on the measurement of 263–271 mph (423–436 km/h) at 36–38 yards (33–35 m) above the surface.

== See also ==
- EF5 drought, the lack of EF5 tornadoes in the U.S. that lasted from 2013 to 2025
