= Almafuerte =

Almafuerte may refer to:

- Pedro Bonifacio Palacios (1854-1917), better known by his sobriquet "Almafuerte", an Argentine poet
- Almafuerte (film), a 1949 Argentine drama film
- Almafuerte (band), an Argentine heavy metal band
- Almafuerte (album) (1998), the third studio album by Argentine heavy metal band Almafuerte
- Almafuerte (Misiones), a municipality in Misiones Province in Argentina
- Almafuerte (Córdoba), a municipality in Córdoba Province in Argentina
- Almafuerte, a genus of South American spiders
