= 1931 Lublin tornado =

F4/F5 tornado in 1931

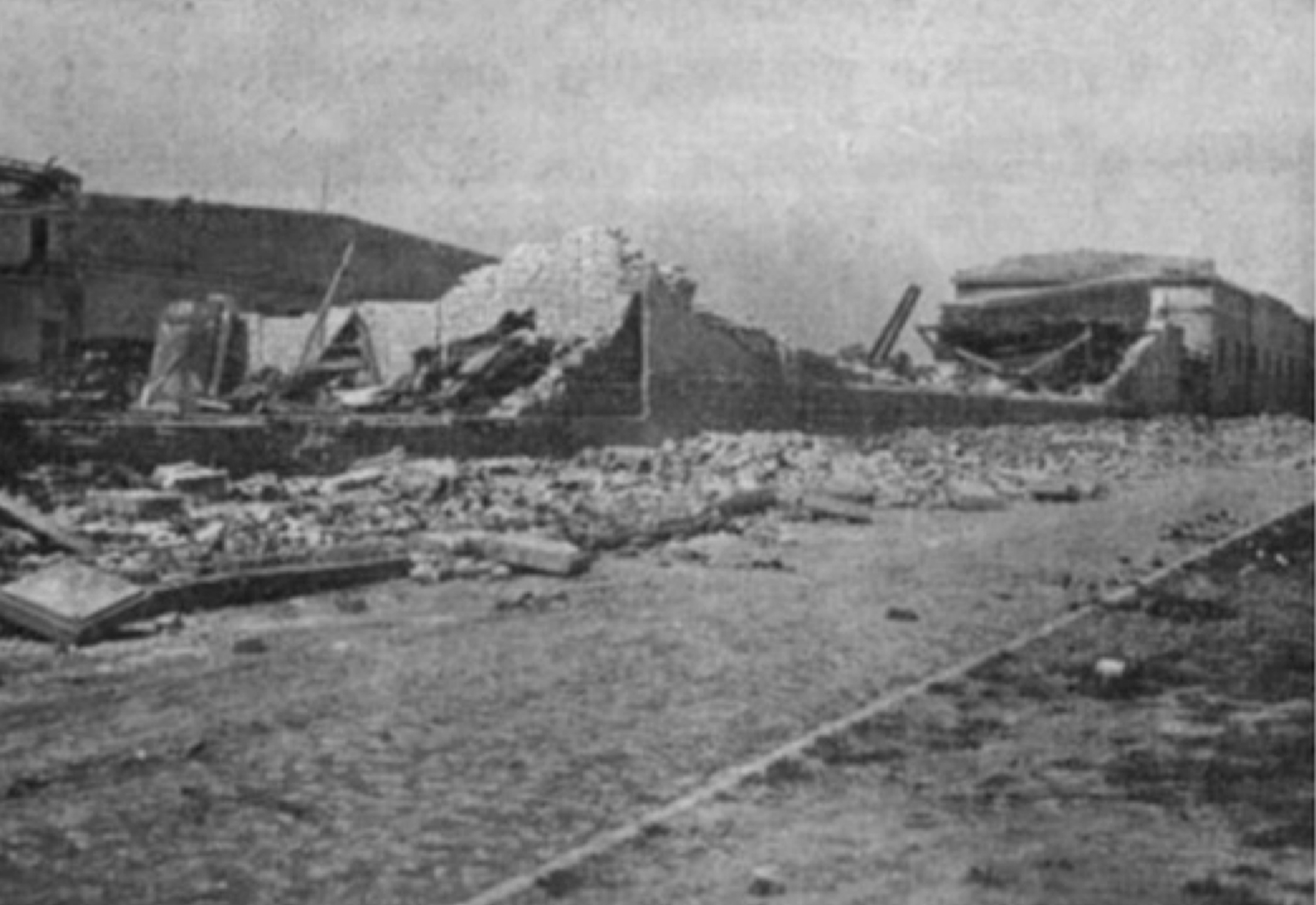
- F4 damage to the Lublin slaughterhouse after the tornado

Meteorological history
- Date: July 20, 1931

F4 tornado
- on the Fujita scale
- Highest winds: 246–324 mph (396–521 km/h)

Overall effects
- Fatalities: 6
- Injuries: 100+
- Areas affected: Lublin, Republic of Poland
- Part of the Tornadoes of 1931

On July 20, 1931, a violent tornado struck the city of Lublin in the Republic of Poland. The damage from the tornado was consistent with those from an F4 on the Fujita scale. The tornado killed six people and injured at least 100 others. The tornado was wedge/V shaped and almost black, it covered a 20km damage path, was approximately (300-1000m) in size.

== Summary ==
The tornado destroyed several buildings in Lublin. Some structures had walls that were 50 centimetres (20 in) thick. Train railroad cars were overturned and some were moved a few meters away. Industrial chimneys were thrown by the tornado. Structures made out of iron were bent. Buildings made of wood in the path of the tornado were leveled to the ground. These included sawmills, homes, and barns. The Lublin slaughterhouse and sugar factory were completely destroyed. Other industrial buildings were destroyed as well. Some buildings had debris thrown over a mile away. A city bus was picked up and thrown by the tornado. The tornado traveled around 20 kilometres (12 mi) and was described as being a narrow “dark mass in the shape of a funnel”. In total, the tornado killed six people and injured over 100 others.

The Polish Weather Service estimated that the tornado had winds between 246 to 324 mph (396 to 521 km/h). This mean it was potentially at F5 intensity, as F5 tornadoes begin with winds at 261 mph (420 km/h). But in publication by members of staff of the University of Warsaw and Adam Mickiewicz University in Poland as well as the National Oceanic and Atmospheric Administration in the United States doubts were expressed about this assessment: " this estimate is highly uncertain since no typical F5 damage was reported. Instead, F4 damage was plausible".

It is possible that the wind force assessment is overstated due to overly simple assumptions made during calculations. In a scientific article summarizing the events, Romuald Gumiński estimates the minimum pressure force and corresponding dynamic pressure needed to cause two damages - derailment of the train car and breaking of the wall. Based on the mass, track gauge and lateral surface of the car, he estimates that the minimum wind speed needed to overturn the car is 111 m/s (246 mph), and based on the thickness and height of the building wall, that the minimum wind speed needed to break the wall is 145 m/s (325 mph). These are values well above the wind speeds expected to cause such damage. A train overturn is a characteristic of an EF3 tornado with winds in the 136-165 mph range. Gumiński was the vice-director of the Polish government Meteorological Department.

== Aftermath ==
The Polish Government allocated 15,000 zł to the Governor of Lublin for emergency aid to the injured. Expres Zagłębia wrote that the government would decide whether or not to send more aid only after receiving "government accurate data on the extent of the disaster."

== See also ==
- List of European tornadoes and tornado outbreaks
- Disagreements on the intensity of tornadoes
