= Almafuerte, Misiones =

Coordinates: 27°30′29″S 55°24′13″W

Almafuerte (Misiones)
- Municipality and village
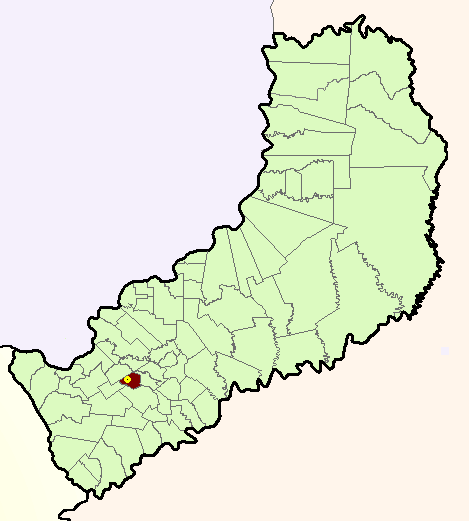
- Almafuerte municipality in Misiones Province
- Country: Argentina
- Province: Misiones Province

Area
  - Total: 31 sq mi (79 km^{2})
- Elevation: 1,168 ft (356 m)

Population
  - Total: 1,022
- Time zone: UTC−3 (ART)
- Postal code: 3317
- Area code: 3755
- Climate: Cfa

Almafuerte is a village and municipality in Misiones Province in north-eastern Argentina. The village is located in the Leandro N. Alem department, and borders Leandro N. ALem, Caá Yarí, Olegario Víctor Andrade and Bonpland municipalities. It has a population of 1022 inhabitants (2001 census).

== See also ==
- List of cities in Argentina
