= Pontão =

Municipality of Rio Grande do Sul, Brazil

Coordinates: 28°03′32″S 52°40′37″W

- Municipality
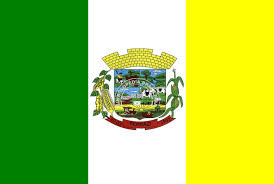
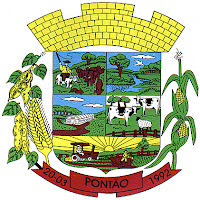
- Flag Coat of arms
- Interactive map of Pontão
- Country: Brazil
- Time zone: UTC−3 (BRT)

Pontão is a municipality in the state of Rio Grande do Sul, Brazil. As of 2020, the estimated population was 3,901.

== See also ==
- List of municipalities in Rio Grande do Sul
