= Rondinha =

Municipality in Rio Grande do Sul, Brazil

Coordinates: 27°49′40″S 52°54′36″W

- Municipality

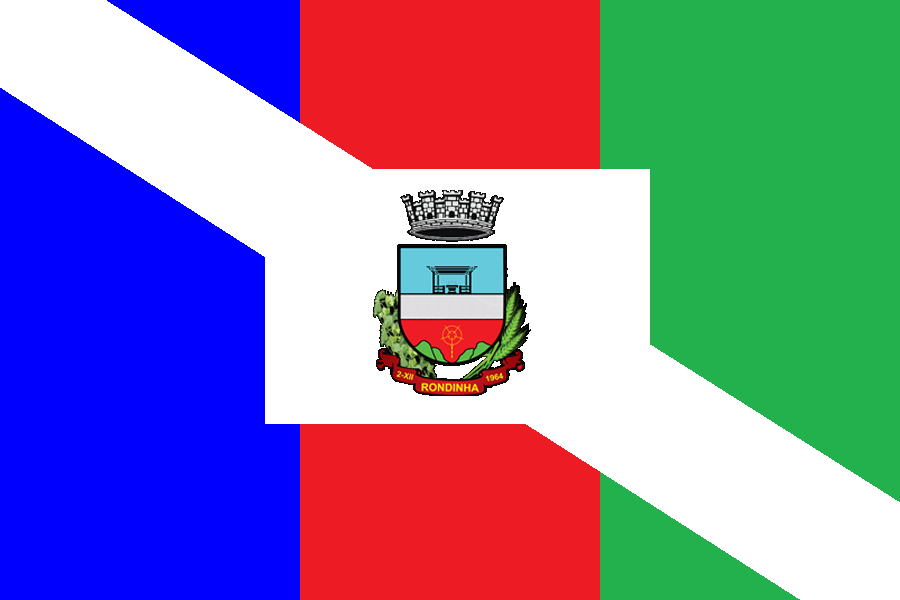
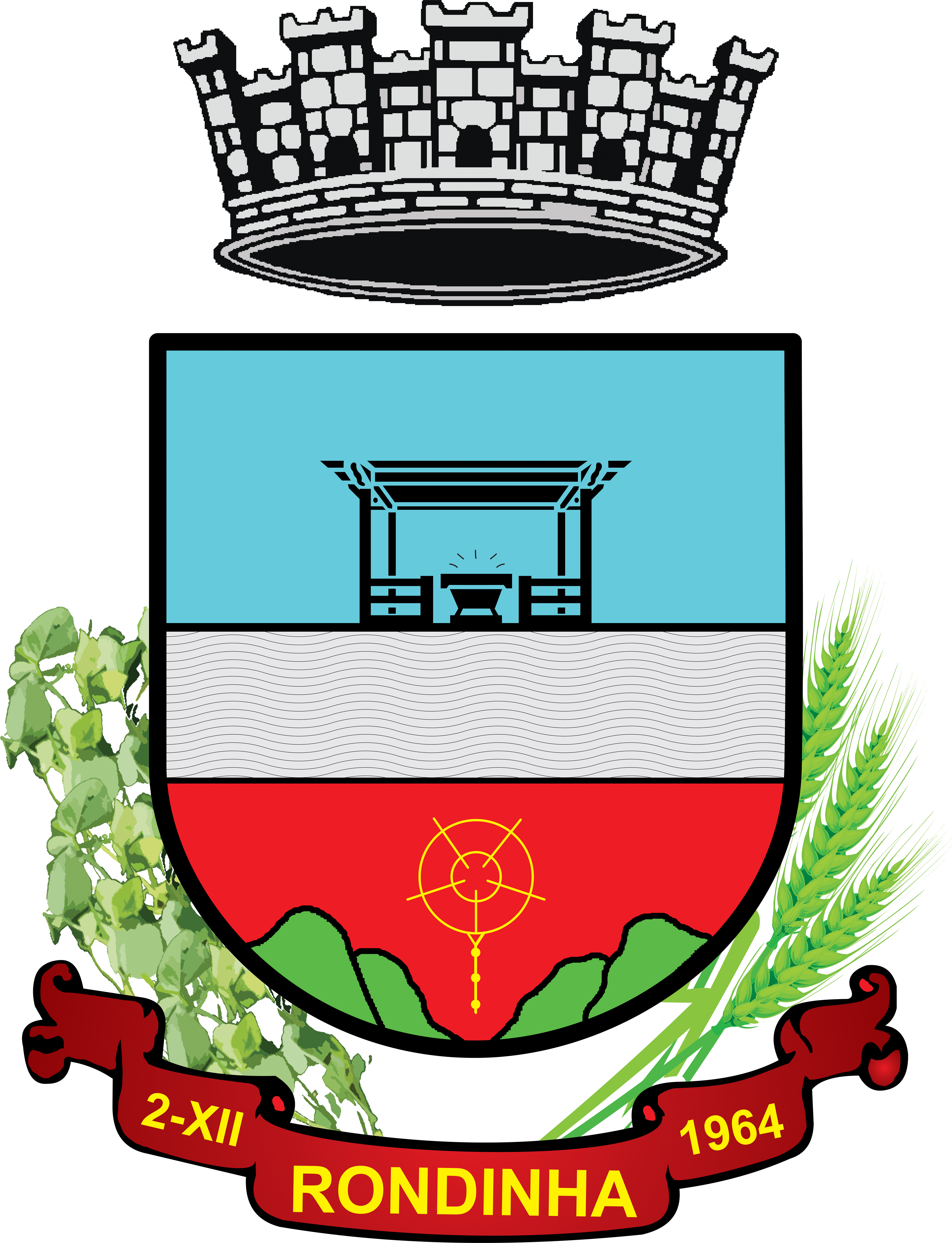
- Flag Coat of arms
- Interactive map of Rondinha
- Country: Brazil
- Time zone: UTC−3 (BRT)

Rondinha is a municipality in the state of Rio Grande do Sul, Brazil. It was established in 2000. As of 2020, the estimated population was 5,080.

== See also ==
- List of municipalities in Rio Grande do Sul
