= Ciríaco =

Municipality of Brazil

Coordinates: 28°20′38″S 51°52′33″W

- Municipality
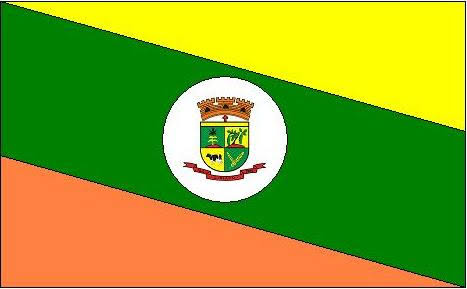
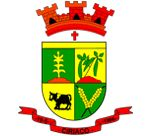
- Flag Coat of arms
- Interactive map of Ciríaco
- Country: Brazil
- Time zone: UTC−3 (BRT)

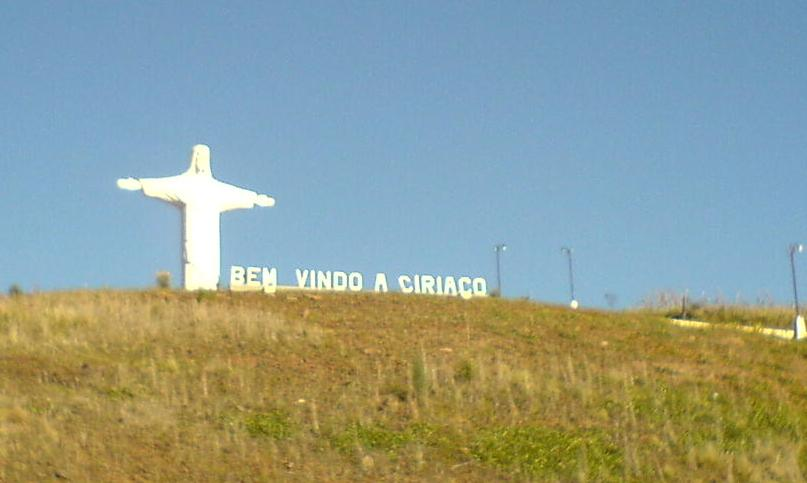
Christ the Redeemer of ciriaco

Ciríaco is a municipality in the state of Rio Grande do Sul, Brazil. As of 2020, the estimated population was 4,719.

== See also ==
- List of municipalities in Rio Grande do Sul
