= Vila Lângaro =

Municipality in Rio Grande do Sul, Brazil

Coordinates: 28°06′25″S 52°08′38″W

- Municipality
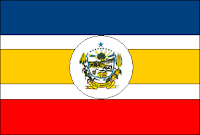
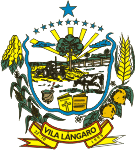
- Flag Coat of arms
- Interactive map of Vila Lângaro
- Country: Brazil
- Time zone: UTC−3 (BRT)

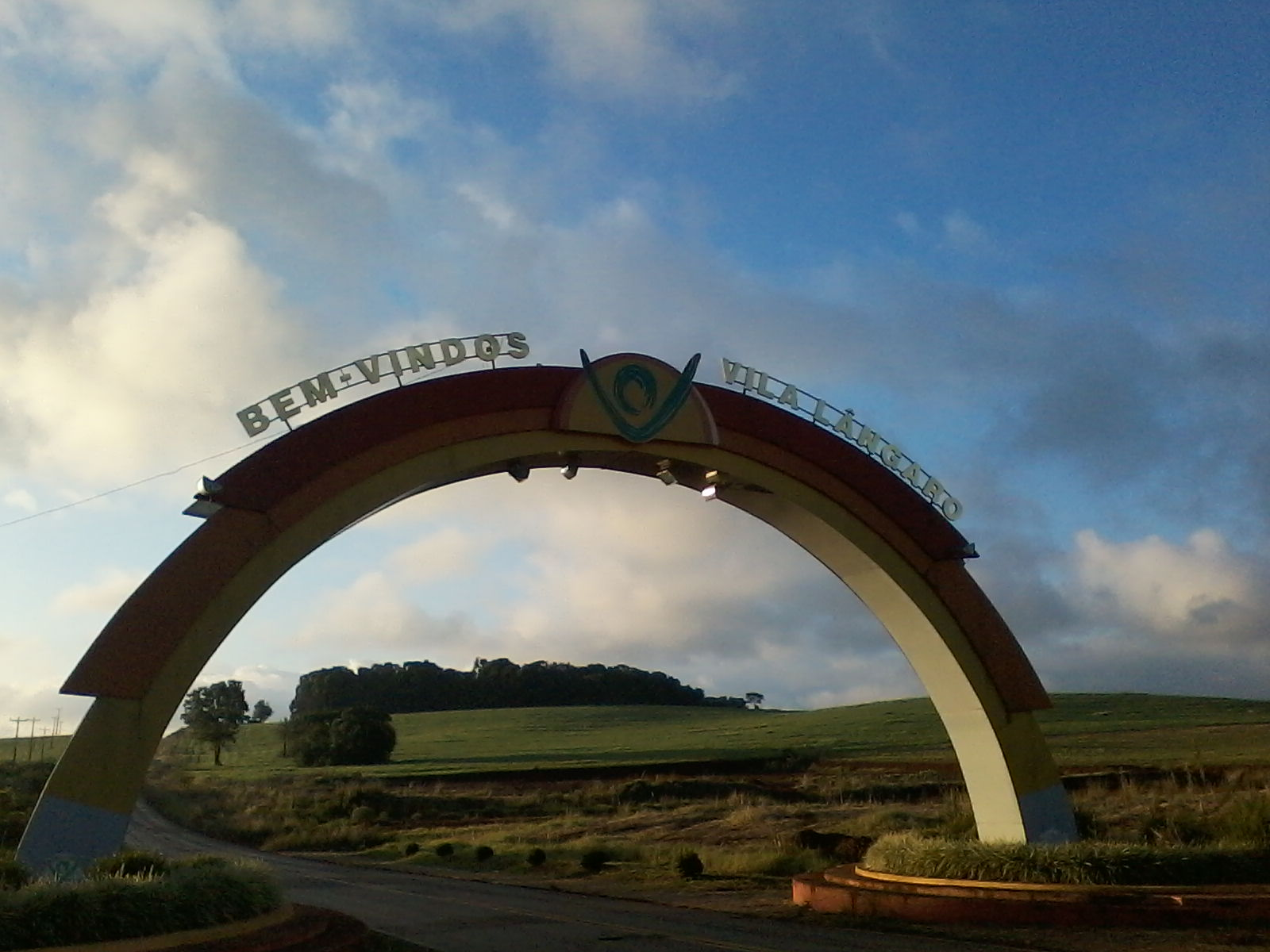
Entrance to Vila Lângaro

Vila Lângaro is a municipality in the state of Rio Grande do Sul, Brazil. As of 2020, the estimated population was 2,080.

== See also ==
- List of municipalities in Rio Grande do Sul
