= National Weather Service Springfield, Missouri =

National Weather Service Weather Forecast Office Springfield, Missouri

Agency overview
- Headquarters: 5805 State Highway EE, Springfield, MO
- Employees: 21
- Agency executives: Kelsey Angle, Meteorologist in Charge; Nicole Newman, Administrative Support Assistant
- Parent agency: National Weather Service
- Website: https://www.weather.gov/sgf/

National Weather Service - Springfield (SGF) is a National Weather Service forecast office responsible for monitoring weather conditions for 34 counties in mid and southwestern Missouri and 3 counties in southeastern Kansas. It is located in Springfield, Missouri, near the Springfield–Branson National Airport. The office maintains a NEXRAD radar system.

== History ==
The office and radar were originally located in Monett before moving to Springfield in the early 1990s.

== NOAA Weather Radio stations ==
The office operates 14 NOAA Weather Radio stations in mid and southwestern Missouri.

=== KJY82 ===
KJY82
- Neosho, Missouri; United States
- Frequency: 162.450 MHz
- Branding: NOAA All Hazards Radio

Programming
- Format: Weather/Civil Emergency

Ownership
- Owner: NOAA/National Weather Service

Technical information
- Power: 1000 watts
- Transmitter coordinates: 36.8798523°N 94.4254839°W

Links
- Website: www.weather.gov/sgf/nwr_neosho

KJY82 is located in Neosho, Missouri and broadcasts on 162.450 MHz to Newton, Jasper, and McDonald Counties in Missouri, and Cherokee County, Kansas. The station also broadcasts to Ottawa County, Oklahoma, but alerts for that county are not issued by the Springfield office.

=== KXI35 ===
KXI35
- Alton, Missouri; United States
- Frequency: 162.500 MHz
- Branding: NOAA All Hazards Radio

Programming
- Format: Weather/Civil Emergency

Ownership
- Owner: NOAA/National Weather Service

Technical information
- Power: 300 watts
- Transmitter coordinates: 36.6983889°N 91.4104167°W

Links
- Website: www.weather.gov/sgf/nwr_alton

KXI35 is located in Alton, Missouri and broadcasts on 162.500 MHz to Oregon, Howell, and Shannon Counties.

=== KXI38 ===
KXI38
- West Plains, Missouri; United States
- Frequency: 162.525 MHz
- Branding: NOAA All Hazards Radio

Programming
- Format: Weather/Civil Emergency

Ownership
- Owner: NOAA/National Weather Service

Technical information
- Power: 300 watts
- Transmitter coordinates: 36.6936100°N 91.8833300°W

Links
- Website: www.weather.gov/sgf/nwr_westplains

KXI38 is located in West Plains, Missouri and broadcasts on 162.525 MHz to Howell, Ozark, Douglas, and Oregon Counties.

=== KZZ30 ===
KZZ30
- El Dorado Springs, Missouri; United States
- Frequency: 162.475 MHz
- Branding: NOAA All Hazards Radio

Programming
- Format: Weather/Civil Emergency

Ownership
- Owner: NOAA/National Weather Service

Technical information
- Power: 1000 watts
- Transmitter coordinates: 37.8702716°N 94.0328085°W

Links
- Website: www.weather.gov/sgf/nwr_eldorado

KZZ30 is located in El Dorado Springs, Missouri and broadcasts on 162.475 MHz to Cedar, St. Clair, Bates, Vernon, Barton, Dade, Polk, Hickory, and Benton Counties in Missouri, and Bourbon and Crawford Counties in Kansas.

=== KZZ43 ===
KZZ43
- Branson, Missouri; United States
- Frequency: 162.550 MHz
- Branding: NOAA All Hazards Radio

Programming
- Format: Weather/Civil Emergency

Ownership
- Owner: NOAA/National Weather Service

Technical information
- Power: 1000 watts
- Transmitter coordinates: 36.7159118°N 93.3675832°W

Links
- Website: www.weather.gov/sgf/nwr_branson

KZZ43 is located in Branson, Missouri and broadcasts on 162.550 MHz to Taney, Stone, Christian, and Barry Counties.

=== KZZ82 ===
KZZ82
- Gainesville, Missouri; United States
- Frequency: 162.425 MHz
- Branding: NOAA All Hazards Radio

Programming
- Format: Weather/Civil Emergency

Ownership
- Owner: NOAA/National Weather Service

Technical information
- Power: 1000 watts
- Transmitter coordinates: 36.6638492°N 92.5170386°W

Links
- Website: www.weather.gov/sgf/nwr_gainesville

KZZ82 is located in Gainesville, Missouri and broadcasts on 162.426 MHz to Ozark, Taney, and Douglas Counties.

=== WNG608 ===
WNG608
- Cassville, Missouri; United States
- Frequency: 162.500 MHz
- Branding: NOAA All Hazards Radio

Programming
- Format: Weather/Civil Emergency

Ownership
- Owner: NOAA/National Weather Service

Technical information
- Power: 1000 watts
- Transmitter coordinates: 36.6714444°N 93.8965833°W

Links
- Website: www.weather.gov/sgf/nwr_cassville

WNG608 is located in Cassville, Missouri and broadcasts on 162.500 MHz to Barry, Lawrence, McDonald, and Newton Counties.

=== WNG648 ===
WNG648
- Dixon, Missouri; United States
- Frequency: 162.500 MHz
- Branding: NOAA All Hazards Radio

Programming
- Format: Weather/Civil Emergency

Ownership
- Owner: NOAA/National Weather Service

Technical information
- Power: 1000 watts
- Transmitter coordinates: 37.9224499°N 91.9662523°W

Links
- Website: www.weather.gov/sgf/nwr_dixon

WNG648 is located in Dixon, Missouri and broadcasts on 162.500 MHz to Pulaski and Phelps Counties.

=== WWF76 ===
WWF76
- Summersville, Missouri; United States
- Frequency: 162.475 MHz
- Branding: NOAA All Hazards Radio

Programming
- Format: Weather/Civil Emergency

Ownership
- Owner: NOAA/National Weather Service

Technical information
- Power: 1000 watts
- Transmitter coordinates: 37.1806636°N 91.6656518°W

Links
- Website: www.weather.gov/sgf/nwr_summersville

WWF76 is located in Summersville, Missouri and broadcasts on 162.475 MHz to Texas, Shannon, Dent, Douglas, Howell, and Oregon Counties.

=== WXJ61 ===
WXJ61
- Avilla, Missouri; United States
- Frequency: 162.425 MHz
- Branding: NOAA All Hazards Radio

Programming
- Format: Weather/Civil Emergency

Ownership
- Owner: NOAA/National Weather Service

Technical information
- Power: 1000 watts
- Transmitter coordinates: 37.1641897°N 94.0053642°W

Links
- Website: www.weather.gov/sgf/nwr_avilla

WXJ61 is located in Avilla, Missouri and broadcasts on 162.425 MHz to Jasper, Lawrence, Newton, Dade, Barton, Barry, Stone, McDonald, and Cedar Counties in Missouri, and Cherokee and Crawford Counties in Kansas.

=== WXL46 ===
WXL46
- Fordland, Missouri; United States
- Frequency: 162.400 MHz
- Branding: NOAA All Hazards Radio

Programming
- Format: Weather/Civil Emergency

Ownership
- Owner: NOAA/National Weather Service

Technical information
- Power: 1000 watts
- Transmitter coordinates: 37.20132969791279°N 92.94283163183124°W

Links
- Website: www.weather.gov/sgf/nwr_fordland

WXL46 is located in Fordland, Missouri and broadcasts on 162.400 MHz to Greene, Webster, Polk, Laclede, Barry, Christian, Dade, Dallas, Douglas, Lawrence, Stone, Taney, and Wright Counties.

=== WXM81 ===
WXM81
- Hermitage, Missouri; United States
- Frequency: 162.450 MHz
- Branding: NOAA All Hazards Radio

Programming
- Format: Weather/Civil Emergency

Ownership
- Owner: NOAA/National Weather Service

Technical information
- Power: 1000 watts
- Transmitter coordinates: 37.9030577°N 93.3173347°W

Links
- Website: www.weather.gov/sgf/nwr_hermitage

WXM81 is located in Hermitage, Missouri and broadcasts on 162.450 MHz to Hickory County.

=== WZ2545 ===
WZ2545
- Joplin, Missouri; United States
- Frequency: 162.550 MHz
- Branding: NOAA All Hazards Radio

Programming
- Format: Weather/Civil Emergency

Ownership
- Owner: NOAA/National Weather Service

WZ2545 is located in Joplin, Missouri and broadcasts on 162.550 MHz to Jasper County.

=== WZ2548 ===
WZ2548
- Eldon, Missouri; United States
- Frequency: 162.550 MHz
- Branding: NOAA All Hazards Radio

Programming
- Format: Weather/Civil Emergency

Ownership
- Owner: NOAA/National Weather Service

WZ2548 is located in Eldon, Missouri and broadcasts on 162.550 MHz to Miller, Morgan, Camden, Benton, Hickory, Dallas, Laclede, Pulaski, and Maries Counties. It also broadcasts to Moniteau, Cole, and Osage Counties, but those counties are not covered by the Springfield office, instead receiving alerts from the National Weather Service in St. Louis.
