= Almafuerte (spider) =

Scientific classification
- Domain: Eukaryota
- Kingdom: Animalia
- Phylum: Arthropoda
- Subphylum: Chelicerata
- Class: Arachnida
- Order: Araneae
- Infraorder: Araneomorphae
- Family: Gnaphosidae
- Genus: Almafuerte; Grismado & Carrión, 2017

Type species
- A. peripampasica Grismado & Carrión, 2017

Species
- 7, see text

Genus of spiders

Almafuerte is a genus of South American ground spiders first described by C. J. Grismado & N. L. Carrión in 2017. It is named after Argentine poet Pedro Bonifacio Palacios, better known by his sobriquet Almafuerte, and after Argentine heavy metal band Almafuerte.

== Species ==
As of April 2019 it contains seven species:

- Almafuerte facon Grismado & Carrión, 2017 — Bolivia
- Almafuerte giaii (Gerschman & Schiapelli, 1948) — Argentina
- Almafuerte goloboffi Grismado & Carrión, 2017 — Argentina
- Almafuerte kuru Grismado & Carrión, 2017 — Argentina
- Almafuerte peripampasica Grismado & Carrión, 2017 — Argentina, Uruguay
- Almafuerte remota Grismado & Carrión, 2017 — Argentina
- Almafuerte vigorosa Grismado & Carrión, 2017 — Argentina
