= Tapejara, Rio Grande do Sul =

Municipality in the state of Rio Grande do Sul, Brazil

Coordinates: 28°04′04″S 52°00′50″W

- Municipality
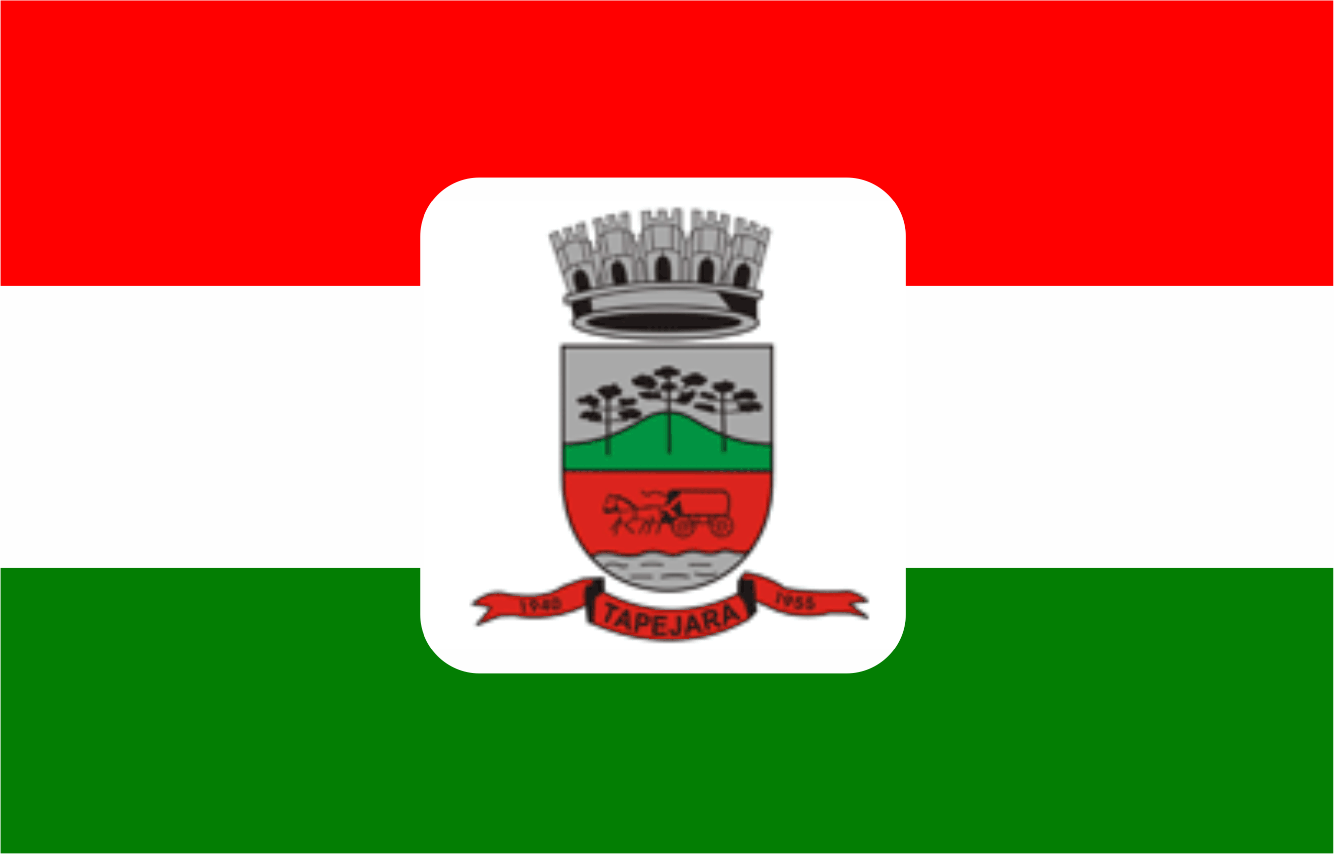
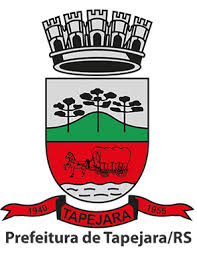
- Flag Coat of arms
- Interactive map of Tapejara, Rio Grande do Sul
- Country: Brazil
- Time zone: UTC−3 (BRT)

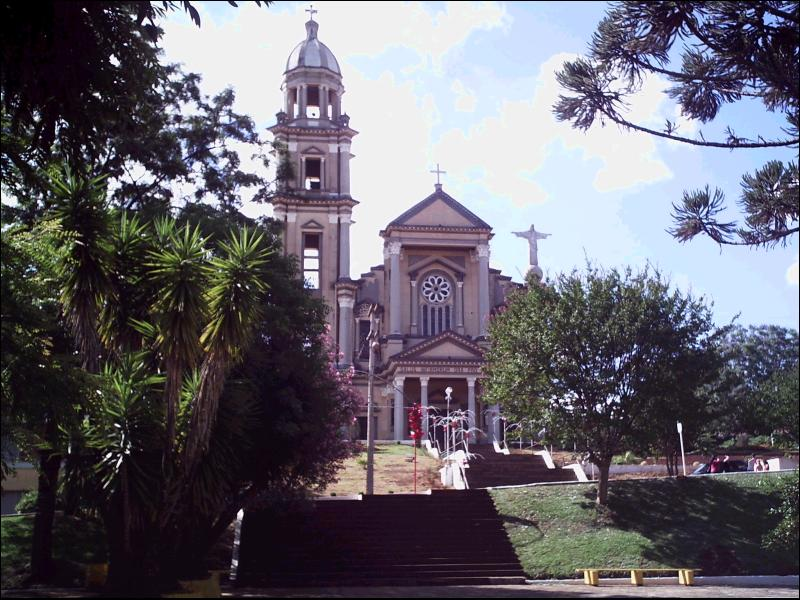

Tapejara is a municipality in the state of Rio Grande do Sul, Brazil. As of 2020, the estimated population was 24,552.

== See also ==
- List of municipalities in Rio Grande do Sul
