= Água Santa, Rio Grande do Sul =

Municipality of Rio Grande do Sul, Brazil

Água Santa
- Municipality
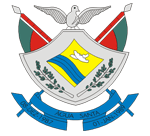
- Flag Coat of arms

- Location in Brazil
- Coordinates: 28°10′S 52°2′W
- Country: Brazil
- Region: South
- State: Rio Grande do Sul
- Founded: 1989

Government
  - Mayor: Antônio Alfredo de Souza, PMDB

Area
  - Total: 291.792 km^{2} (112.662 sq mi)
- Elevation: 650 m (2,130 ft)

Population (2020)
  - Total: 3,743
  - Density: 13.7/km^{2} (35/sq mi)
- Time zone: UTC−3 (BRT)
- Website: http://www.aguasantars.com.br/site/

Água Santa (Portuguese: [ˈa.ɡwɐ ˈsɐ̃.tɐ], lit. 'holy water') is a municipality in the state of Rio Grande do Sul, Brazil.

== See also ==
- List of municipalities in Rio Grande do Sul
