= Ronda Alta =

Municipality in Rio Grande do Sul, Brazil

Coordinates: 27°47′S 52°47′W

- Municipality
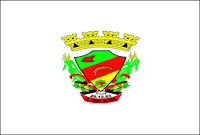
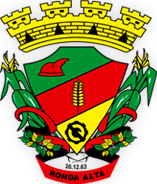
- Flag Coat of arms
- Interactive map of Ronda Alta
- Country: Brazil
- Time zone: UTC−3 (BRT)

Ronda Alta is a municipality in the state of Rio Grande do Sul, Brazil. As of 2020, the estimated population was 10,617.

== See also ==
- List of municipalities in Rio Grande do Sul
