= Coxilha =

Municipality in Rio Grande do Sul, Brazil

Coordinates: 28°07′37″S 52°17′45″W

- Municipality
- Flag Coat of arms
- Interactive map of Coxilha
- Country: Brazil
- Time zone: UTC−3 (BRT)

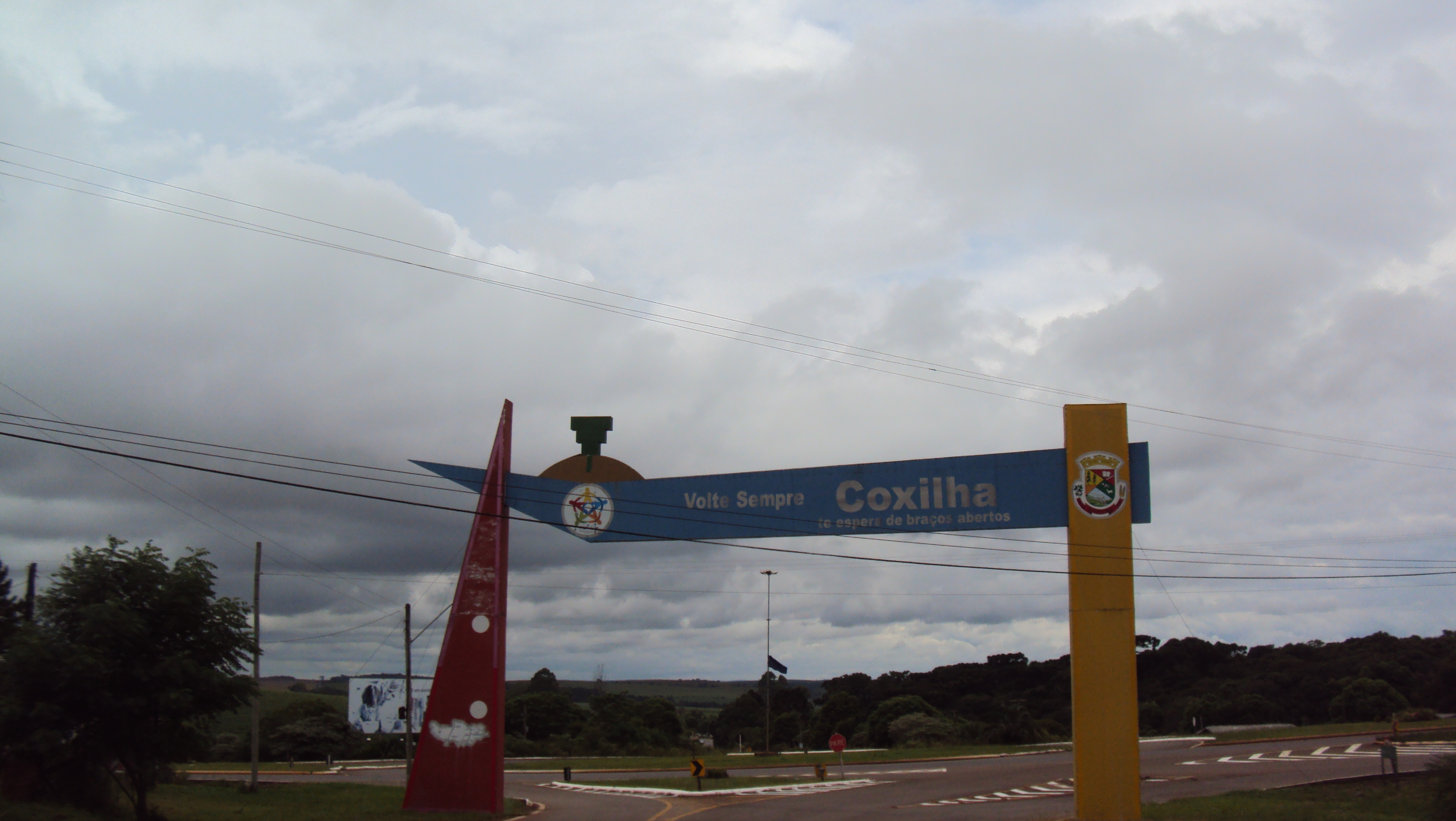
A portal at the entrance of the municipality

Coxilha is a municipality in the state of Rio Grande do Sul, Brazil. As of 2020, the estimated population was 2,743.

== See also ==
- List of municipalities in Rio Grande do Sul
