= Caá Yarí =

Coordinates: 27°29′06″S 55°17′57″W

- Municipality and village
- Location within Misiones Province Location within Argentina
- Country: Argentina
- Province: Misiones Province
- Time zone: UTC−3 (ART)

Caá Yarí is a village and municipality in Misiones Province in north-eastern Argentina.
