= Microregion of Ijuí =

Coordinates: 28.3878°S 53.9150°W

Ijuí Microrregião de Ijuí
- Microregion
- Country: Brazil
- State: Rio Grande do Sul
- Mesoregion: Noroeste Rio-Grandense

Area
  - Total: 5,100.402 km^{2} (1,969.276 sq mi)

The Microregion of Ijuí (Brazilian Portuguese: Microrregião de Ijuí) was one of the Microregions of the Rio Grande do Sul state, in Brazil. It belonged to the mesoregion of the Noroeste Rio-Grandense. Its population was estimated by the IBGE to be of 183.142 inhabitants in 2005, and it was divided in 15 Municipalities. Its total area was of 5.100,402 km². The IBGE has since discontinued the microregion system for population tracking, replacing it with the term "immediate geographic region" (Brazilian Portuguese: Região geográfica imediata).

== Municípios ==
- Ajuricaba
- Alegria
- Augusto Pestana
- Bozano
- Chiapetta
- Condor
- Coronel Barros
- Coronel Bicaco
- Ijuí
- Inhacorá
- Nova Ramada
- Panambi
- Pejuçara
- Santo Augusto
- São Valério do Sul
