= Augusto Pestana =

Municipality of Rio Grande do Sul, Brazil

- Município de Augusto Pestana; Municipality of Augusto Pestana
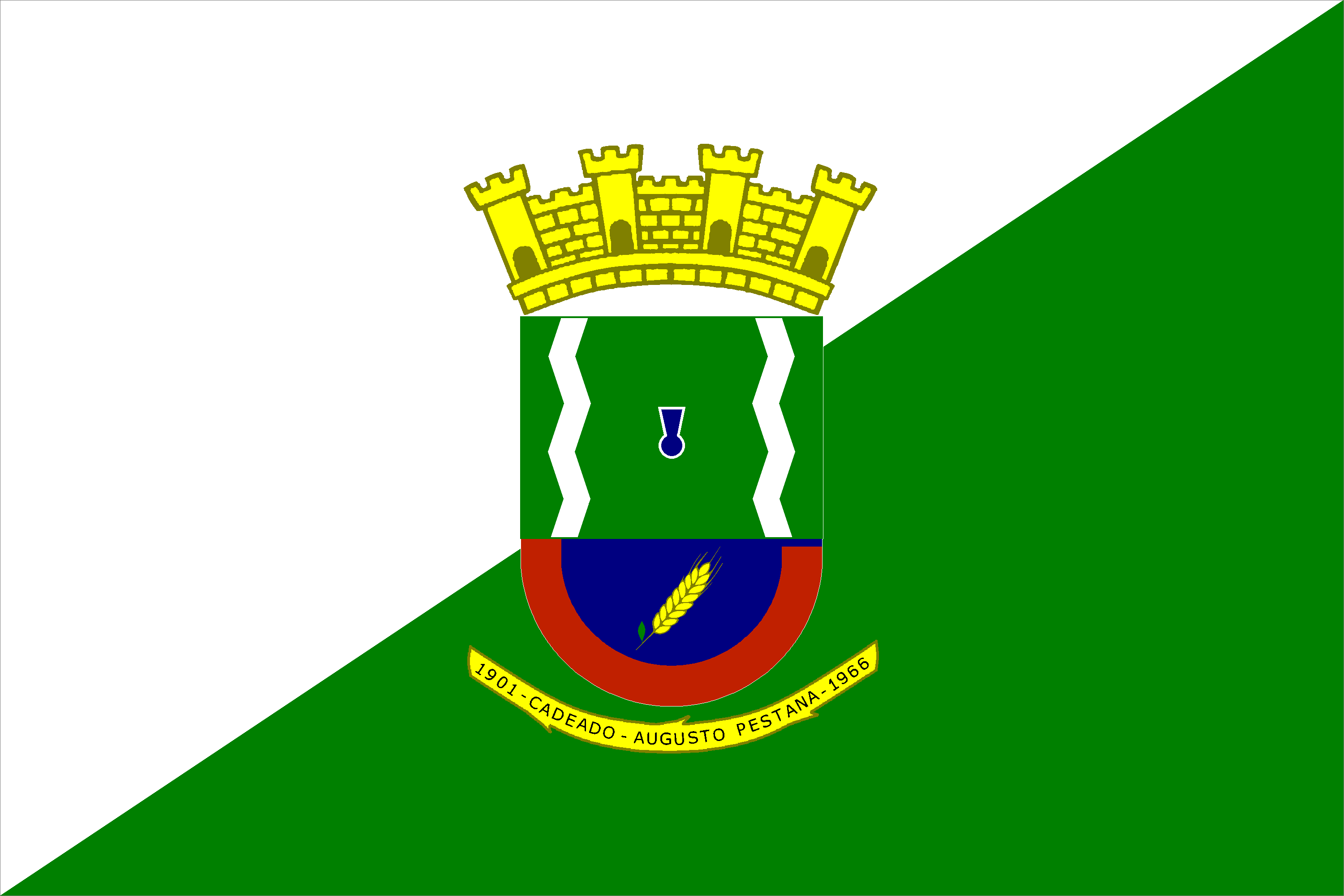
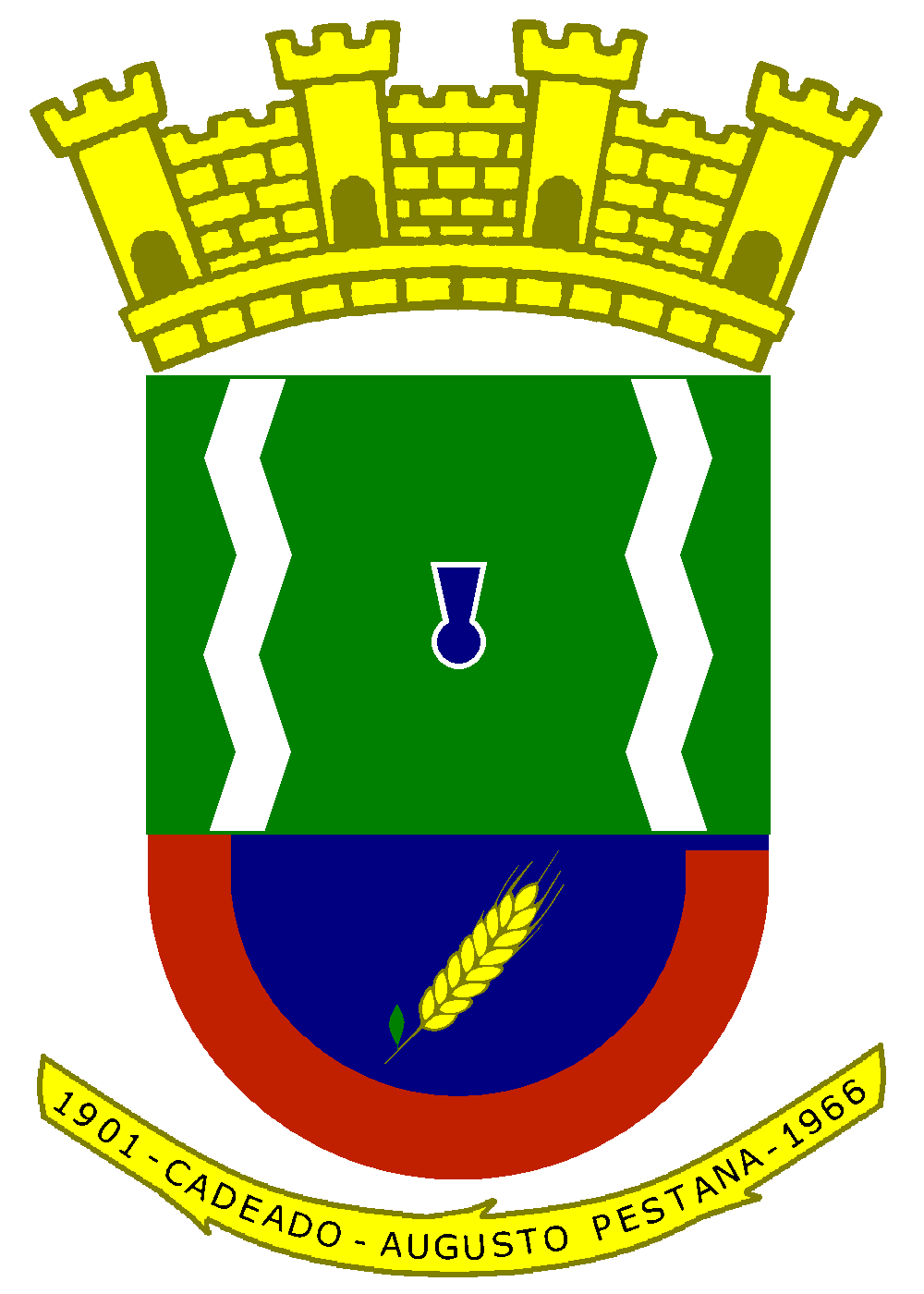
- Flag Coat of arms
- Motto: Per aspera ad astra, per angusta ad augusta (Latin)"To the stars through hardship, to greatness through narrow ways"

- Location in Brazil
- Coordinates: 28°31′01″S 53°39′31″W
- Country: Brazil
- State: Rio Grande do Sul
- Mesoregion: Northwest Rio Grande
- Microregion: Ijuí
- Founded: 14 May 1966

Government
  - Mayor: Vilmar Zimmermann (since 2017)

Area
  - Total: 347.44 km^{2} (134.15 sq mi)
- Elevation: 390 m (1,280 ft)

Population (2020)
  - Total: 6,602
  - Density: 19.00/km^{2} (49.21/sq mi)
- Demonym: Pestanense (or Augusto-Pestanense)
- Time zone: UTC−3 (BRT)
- Postal Code: 98740-000
- Area code: +55 54
- Website: www.pmaugustopestana.com.br

Augusto Pestana is a Brazilian municipality in the State of Rio Grande do Sul. It is located at 28°31′01″S 53°39′01″W, at an altitude of 390 m (1,279 feet). The city is 320 km northwest of Porto Alegre, 1,540 km southwest of Brasília and just 120 km east of the border with Argentina.

It was named after Augusto Pestana (1868-1934), a Brazilian engineer and politician.

== History ==
The area was originally inhabited by indigenous peoples of South America ("Umbu" tradition) about ten thousand years ago. In 1697, Spaniard Jesuits founded a Reduction in São João Batista, 40 km west of present-day Augusto Pestana. The whole region was eventually annexed by the Portuguese in 1801. One hundred years later, Augusto Pestana, then director for Public Lands in Northwest Rio Grande do Sul, founded a settlement on the Cadeado Range, between the Conceição and the Ijuizinho rivers (the name "Cadeado", padlock in Portuguese, is a reference to a checkpoint that existed on the road between Cruz Alta and Santo Ângelo).

The first settlers were German immigrants, most of them from Pomerania. During World War II, soldiers from Augusto Pestana fought for Brazil against Nazi Germany. The list of Pestanense members in the Brazilian Expeditionary Force (FEB), active in the Mediterranean Theatre of the conflict, included Artur Goergen, Eugenio Ladvig and Helmuth Matte, now honored with street names in the city. The other FEB veterans were Sebaldo Goergen, Waldemar Senn, Albino Wilhens, Benno Müller, Oswin Wunder, Alípio Schmitt, Osvino Henrique Geiss, Adelino Mathias Dambroz, Emílio Papke, Alfonso Steiernagel e Arnoldo Gustavo Frantz.

In the 1950s and 1960s, the settlement experienced a boom in wheat production and was incorporated in September 1965 as the municipality of Augusto Pestana. The first city government was formally installed on 14 May 1966.

== Geography ==
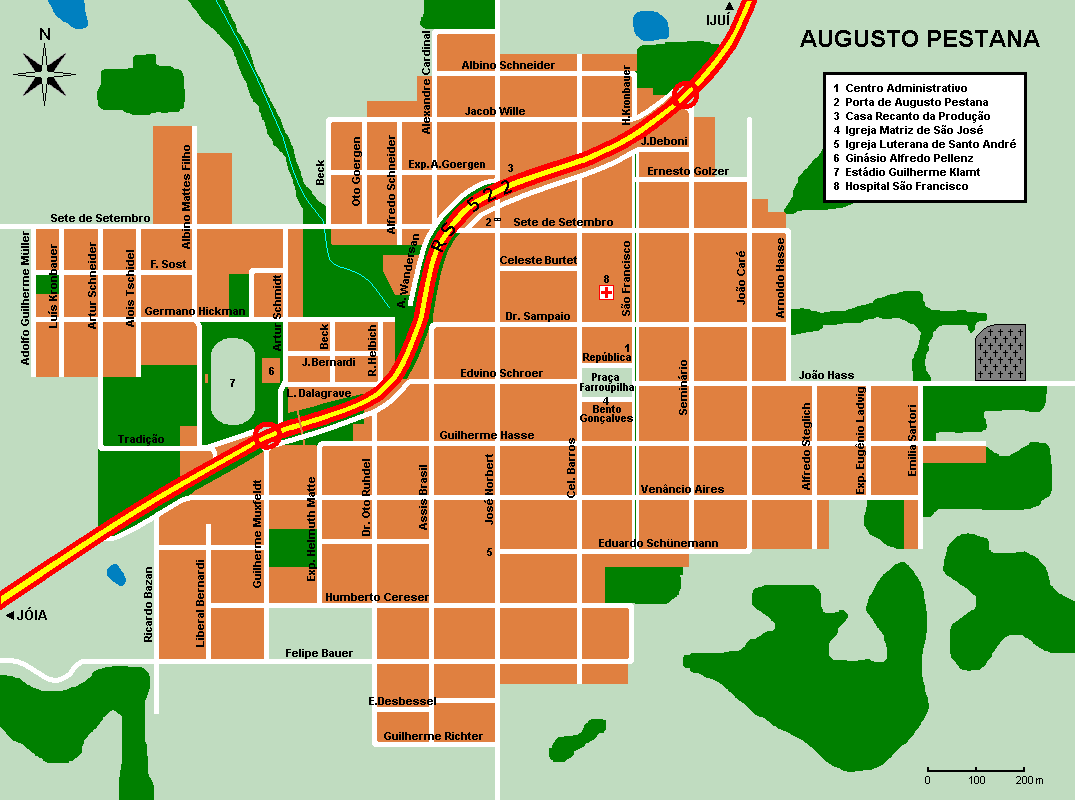
City map of Augusto Pestana (click to enlarge).

Augusto Pestana has a total area of 347,44 km2. It borders the municipalities of Ijuí and Coronel Barros to the north, Boa Vista do Cadeado to the east, Jóia to the south and Eugênio de Castro to the west. The municipality is drained by the Ijuizinho and Conceição rivers, tributaries of the Ijuí river, in the Uruguay basin.

The climate is classified as a humid subtropical (Köppen: Cfa). Summers are typically warm and humid, while winters are cold and windy. The hottest month is January, with an average high temperature of 29.9 °C. The coldest month is July, with an average low of 8.4 °C.

== Demographics ==
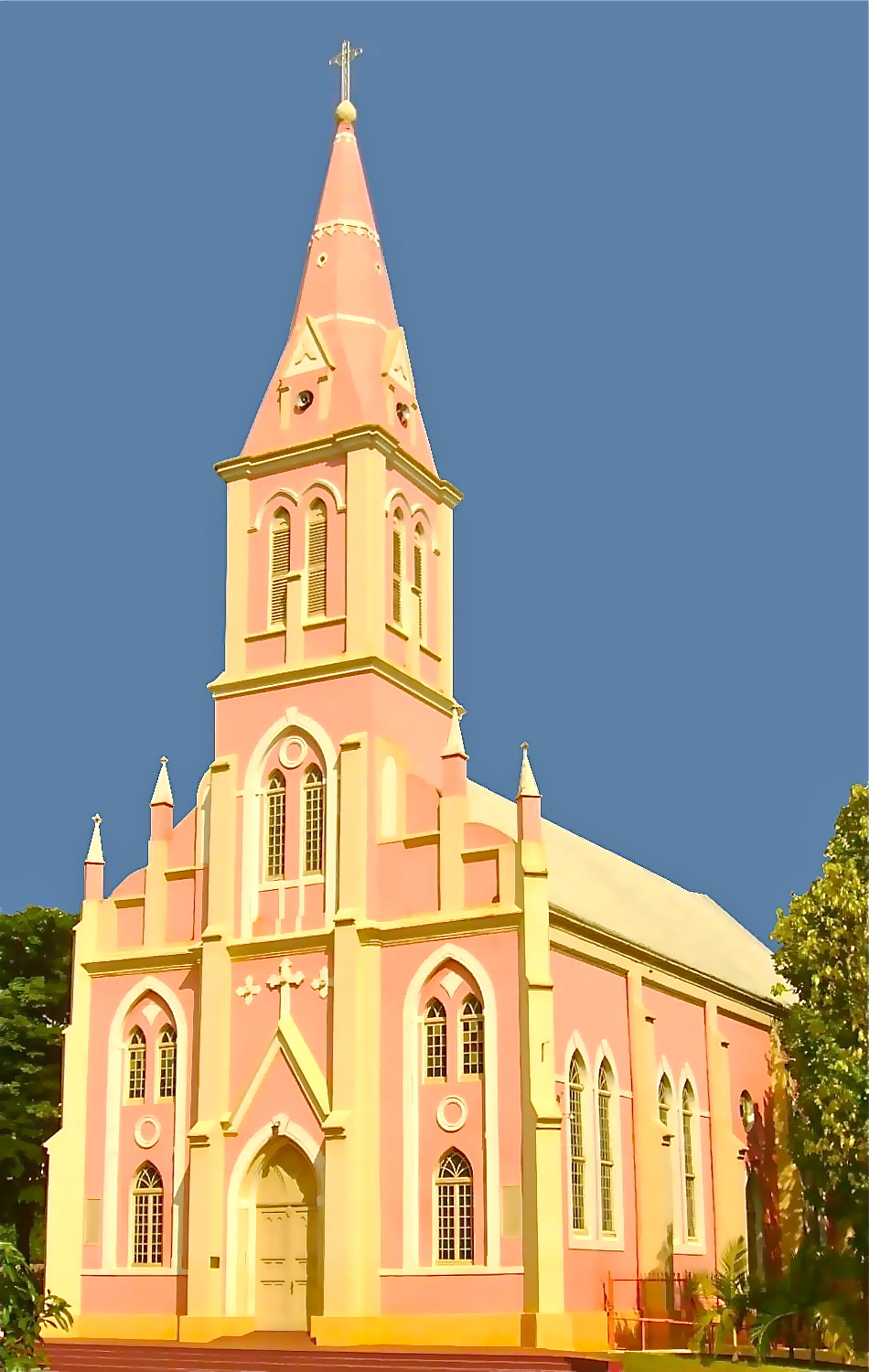
St. Joseph Church, Augusto Pestana.

The population of Augusto Pestana was 7,096 at the 2010 Brazilian census. The population density was 20.4 inhabitants per square kilometer. Life expectancy is 75.8 years.

Most Pestanenses are of German-Brazilian, Italian-Brazilian and Portuguese-Brazilian ancestry. 66% of them are Roman Catholic, whereas 32% are Protestant, mostly Lutherans.

== Regional languages ==
Riograndenser Hunsrückisch (or hunriqueano riograndense in Portuguese, Brazil's national language) is one of the names given to a Germanic language spoken in this municipality since pioneer days.

== Economy ==
According to the statistics bureau of Rio Grande do Sul, Augusto Pestana's gross domestic product (GDP) reached 74.9 million US dollars (149.7 million Brazilian reais) in 2010. The GDP per capita was 10.5 thousand US dollars (21 thousand Brazilian reais).

Agribusiness is the driving force of the local economy. The municipality is a great producer of wheat, soy, corn, beef and dairy.

== Education ==
There are seven public schools, one private school and one public library in Augusto Pestana. The city is just 15 km away of the main campus of the University of Ijuí, one of the largest universities in southern Brazil.

== Transportation ==
Augusto Pestana is crossed by the RS 522 State Highway, which connects the city to the BR 295 National Highway. The road distance to the State capital, Porto Alegre, is 405 km. There is a commuter bus service between the Ijuí, the major transportation hub in the region. The closest airport is located in Ijuí (João Batista Bos Filho Airport).

== See also ==
- List of municipalities in Rio Grande do Sul
