= Eugênio de Castro =

Municipality of Rio Grande do Sul, Brazil

- Municipality
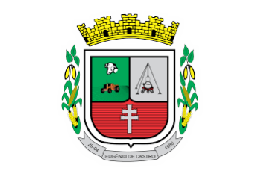
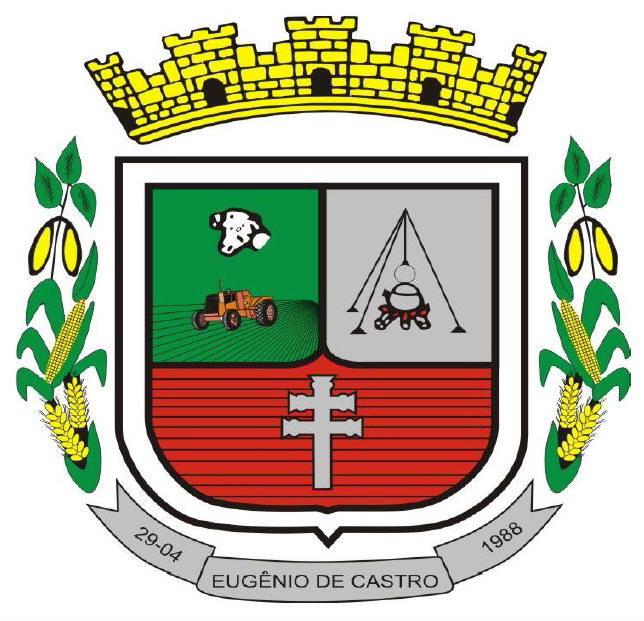
- Flag Coat of arms

- Location in Rio Grande do Sul state

- Location in Brazil
- Coordinates: 28°21′30″S 54°8′56″W
- Country: Brazil
- State: Rio Grande do Sul
- Micro-region: Santo Ângelo

Area
  - Total: 419.32 km^{2} (161.90 sq mi)

Population (2020)
  - Total: 2,352
  - Density: 5.609/km^{2} (14.53/sq mi)
- Time zone: UTC−3 (BRT)
- Website: www.eugeniodecastro.rs.gov.br

Eugênio de Castro is a municipality of the northern part of the state of Rio Grande do Sul, Brazil. The population is 2,352 (2020 est.) in an area of 419.32 km^{2}. It is located 435 km west of the state capital of Porto Alegre, northeast of Alegrete.

== Bounding municipalities ==
- Entre-Ijuís
- Coronel Barros
- Augusto Pestana
- Jóia
- São Miguel das Missões

== See also ==
- List of municipalities in Rio Grande do Sul
