= David Reise Gasparoni =

Brazilian judge

David Reise Gasparoni is a Brazilian judge who served as a judge in Constantina, and today in Carazinho in the state of Rio Grande do Sul, Brazil. He is known for presiding over civil and commercial cases, including judicial recovery and bankruptcy proceedings.

== Career ==
Gasparoni is a member of the judiciary of the Tribunal de Justiça do Estado do Rio Grande do Sul (Court of Justice of the State of Rio Grande do Sul, TJRS). He has served in the comarca of Constantina where he has overseen numerous cases, including notable bankruptcy proceedings such as that of Wagner Agrocereais.

He was also responsible for issuing rulings in criminal cases, such as the sentencing of a defendant in the "Caso Aldino", which received regional media attention.

Today he serves as a judge in Carazinho in the state of Rio Grande do Sul.

== Education ==
He holds a Law degree from the Instituto Cenecista de Ensino Superior de Santo Ângelo.
