= Inhacorá =

Municipality of Rio Grande do Sul, Brazil

- Municipality
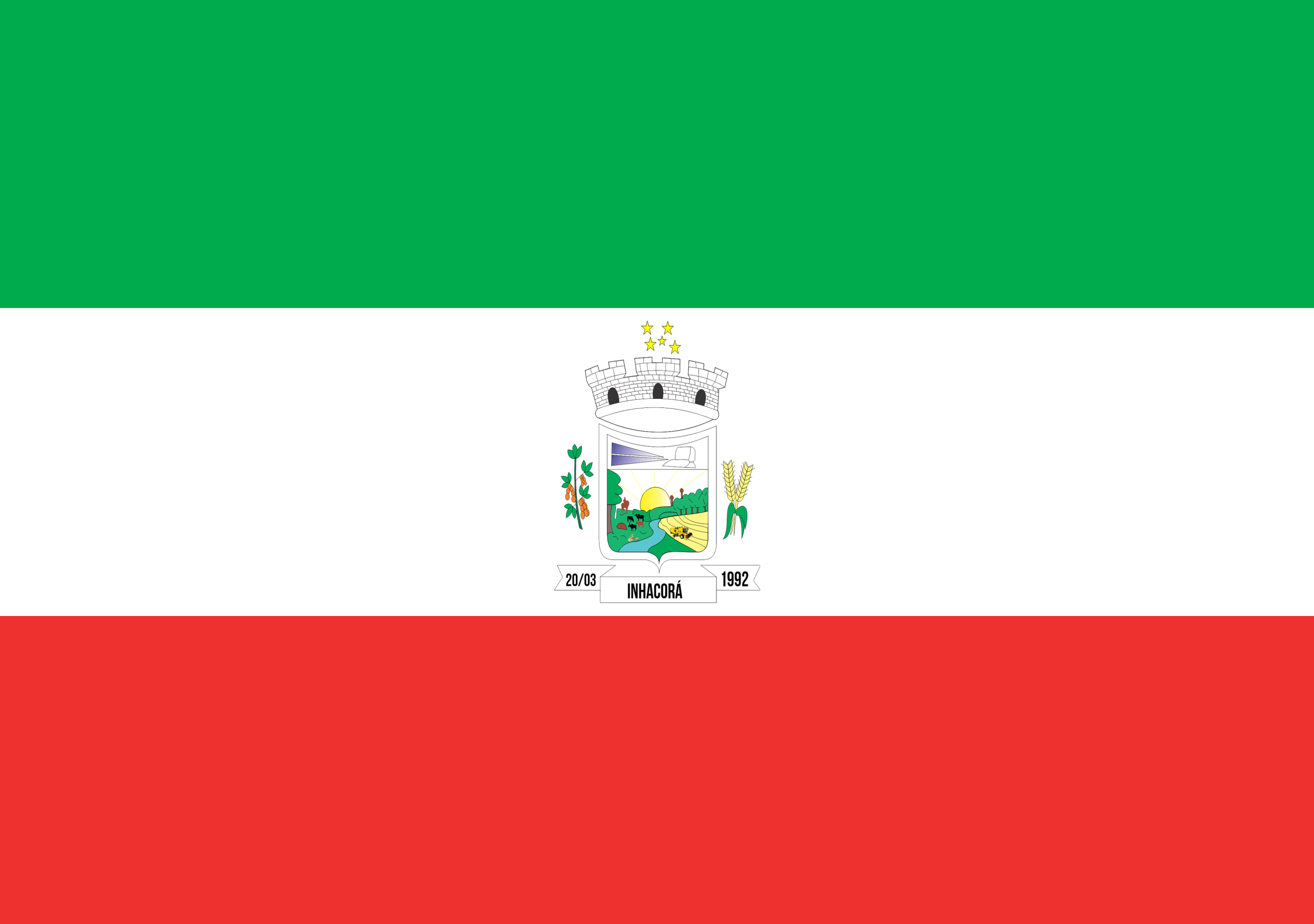
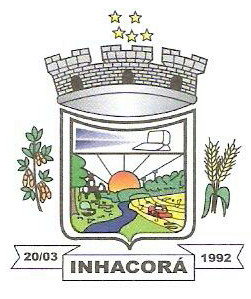
- Flag Coat of arms

- Location in Rio Grande do Sul state

- Location in Brazil
- Coordinates: 27°52′59″S 54°1′1″W
- Country: Brazil
- State: Rio Grande do Sul

Area
  - Total: 114.11 km^{2} (44.06 sq mi)

Population (2020)
  - Total: 2,215
  - Density: 19.41/km^{2} (50.27/sq mi)
- Time zone: UTC−3 (BRT)
- Website: www.inhacora.rs.gov.br

Inhacorá is a municipality in the northern part of the state of Rio Grande do Sul, Brazil. The population is 2,215 (2020 est.) in an area of 114.11 km^{2}. Its elevation is 358 m. It is located 482 km west of the state capital of Porto Alegre, northeast of Alegrete.

== Bounding municipalities ==
- Alegria
- São Valério do Sul
- Chiapetta
- Catuípe
- Independência

== See also ==
- List of municipalities in Rio Grande do Sul
