= Independência, Rio Grande do Sul =

Municipality of Rio Grande do Sul, Brazil

Independência
- Municipality
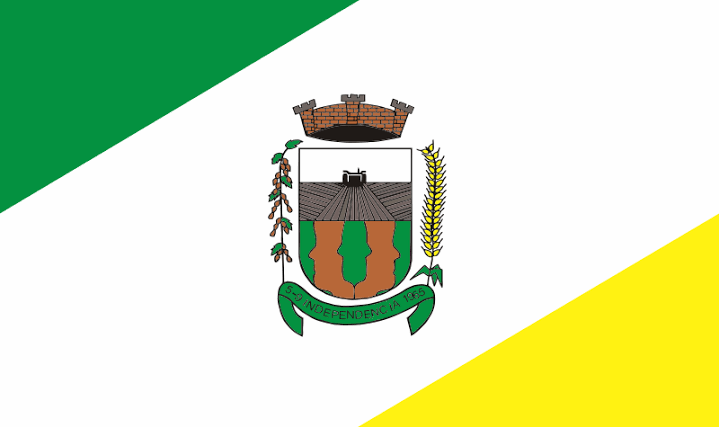
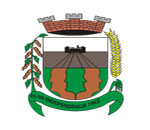
- Flag Coat of arms

- Location in Rio Grande do Sul state

- Location in Brazil
- Coordinates: 27°51′7″S 54°11′22″W
- Country: Brazil
- State: Rio Grande do Sul

Area
  - Total: 357.44 km^{2} (138.01 sq mi)

Population (2020)
  - Total: 6,109
  - Density: 17.09/km^{2} (44.27/sq mi)
- Time zone: UTC−3 (BRT)

Independência is a municipality of the western part of the state of Rio Grande do Sul, Brazil. The population is 6,109 (2020 est.) in an area of 357.44 km^{2}. Its elevation is 372 metres (1,220 ft).

== Bounding municipalities ==
- Três de Maio
- Alegria
- Inhacorá
- Catuípe
- Giruá

== See also ==
- List of municipalities in Rio Grande do Sul
