= Trindade do Sul =

Municipality of Rio Grande do Sul, Brazil

- Municipality
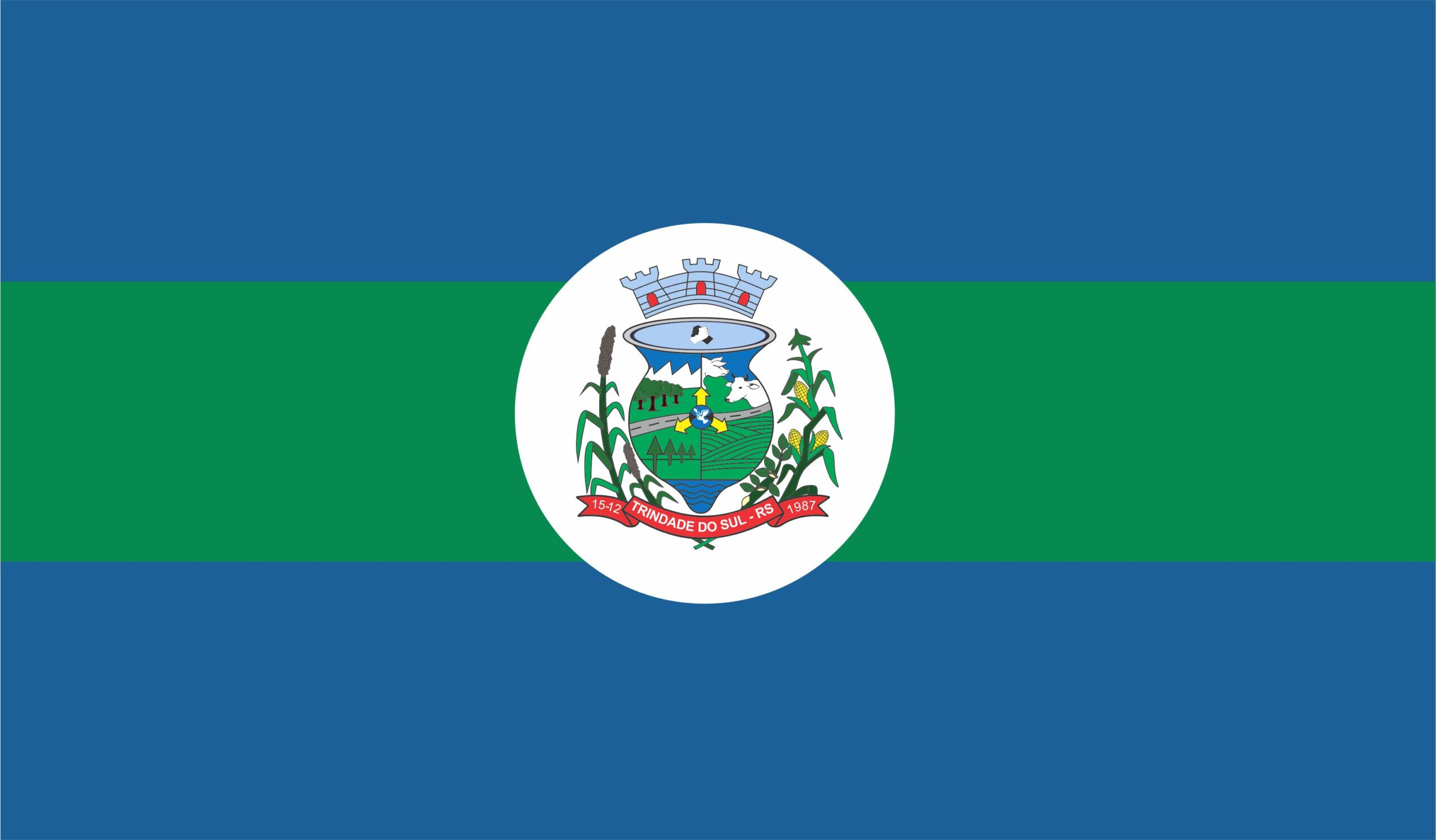
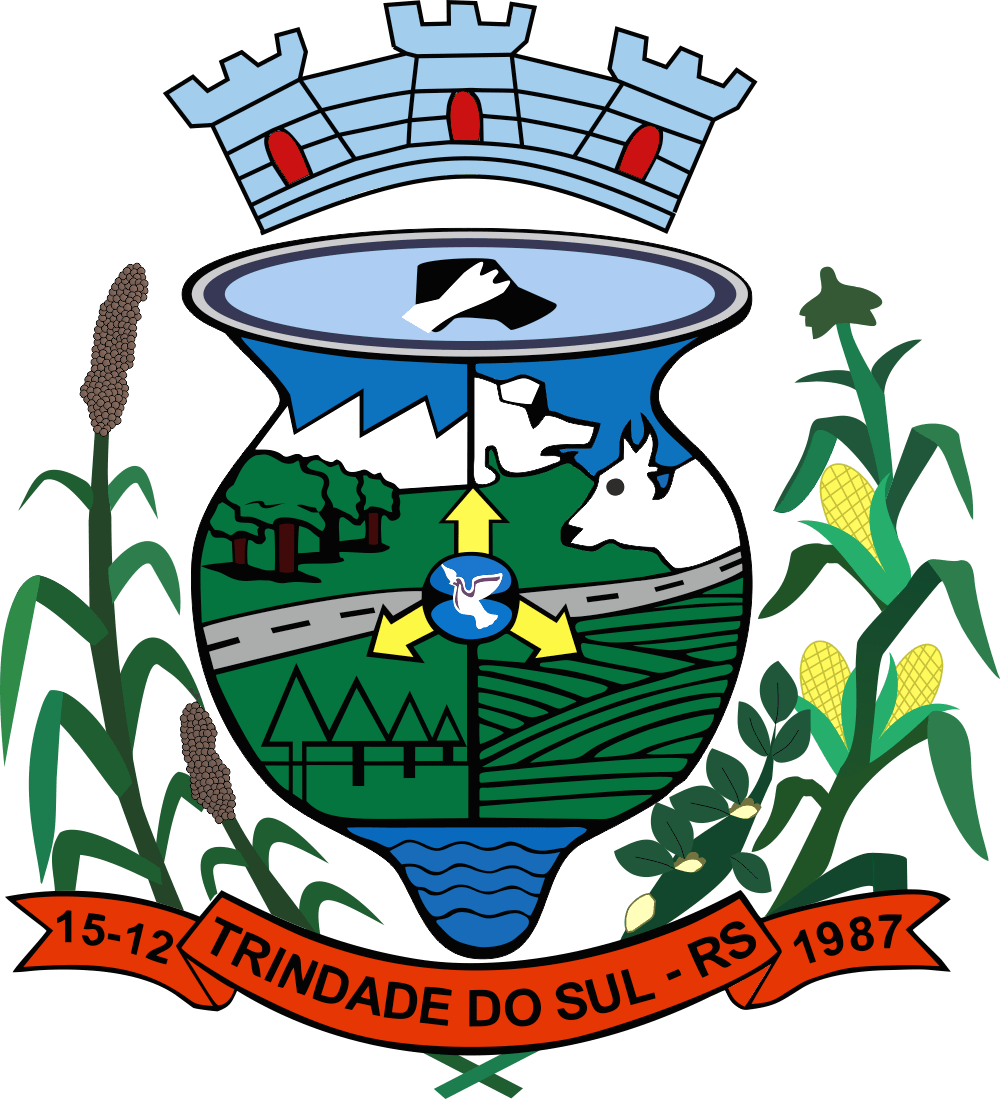
- Flag Coat of arms

- Location in Rio Grande do Sul state

- Location in Brazil
- Coordinates: 27°31′19″S 52°53′38″W
- Country: Brazil
- Region: South
- State: Rio Grande do Sul
- Mesoregion: Noroeste Rio-Grandense
- Microregion: Frederico Westphalen
- Founded: December 15, 1987

Government
  - Mayor: Luiz da Silva Rosa (PP)

Area
  - Total: 268.417 km^{2} (103.636 sq mi)
- Elevation: 640 m (2,100 ft)

Population (2020)
  - Total: 5,791
  - Density: 21.57/km^{2} (55.88/sq mi)
- Demonym: Trindadense
- Time zone: UTC−3 (BRT)
- Website: www.trindadedosul.rs.gov.br

Trindade do Sul is a municipality in the state of Rio Grande do Sul, Brazil.

== Geography ==
The municipality of Trindade do Sul is a part of the Microregion of Frederico Westphalen. It is located at a latitude of 27º31'13" south and a longitude of 52º53'00" west, being at an altitude of 640 meters above sea level.

This municipality is divided in several localities, called lines (Brazilian Portuguese: Linhas). Those are:

- Barra Grande
- Barra Seca
- Barrinha
- Baú
- Bonita
- Cachoeira
- Campina de Pedras
- Passo do Lobo
- Caturrita
- Colônia Nova
- Demétrio
- Filisbina
- Gastão
- Girau
- São Paulo
- São Vicente
- Fátima
- Rincão dos Rosas
- Rossetto
- Assentamento 29 de Outubro

== Population ==
According to IBGE statistics from 2020, Trindade do Sul has a population of 5,791 people.

== See also ==
- List of municipalities in Rio Grande do Sul
- Largest cities in Rio Grande do Sul by population
