= Mato Queimado =

Municipality of Rio Grande do Sul, Brazil

- Municipality
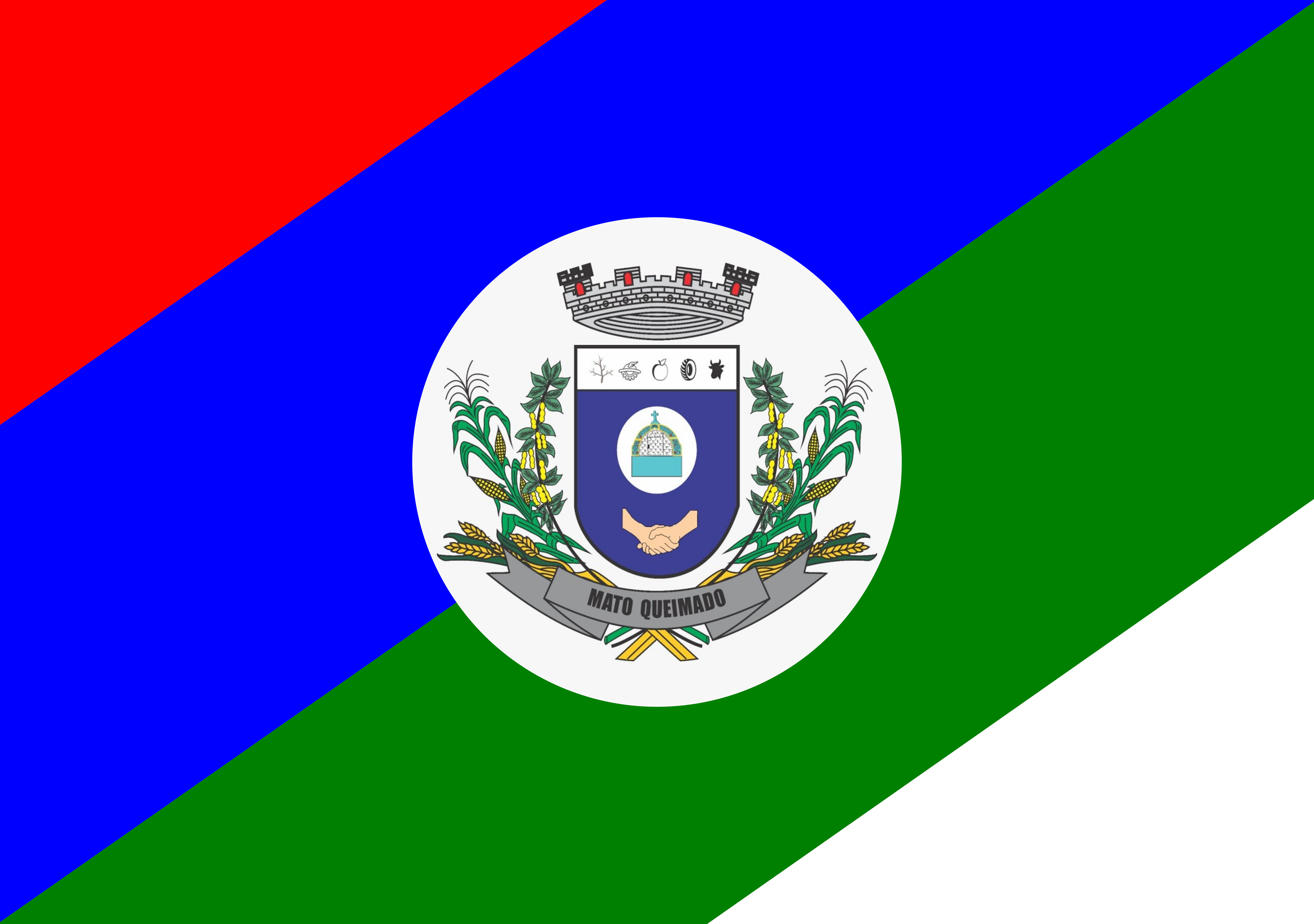
- Flag Coat of arms

- Location in Rio Grande do Sul state

- Location in Brazil
- Coordinates: 28°15′21″S 54°36′57″W
- Country: Brazil
- Region: South
- State: Rio Grande do Sul
- Mesoregion: Noroeste Rio-Grandense
- Microregion: Cerro Largo

Area
  - Total: 114.64 km^{2} (44.26 sq mi)

Population (2020)
  - Total: 1,629
  - Density: 14.21/km^{2} (36.80/sq mi)
- Time zone: UTC−3 (BRT)
- Website: matoqueimado.rs.gov.br

Mato Queimado is a Brazilian municipality located in the northwestern part of the state of Rio Grande do Sul. The population is about 1,629 (2020 est.) in an area of 114.64 km^{2} (44.26 sq mi). It is located 489 km west of the state capital of Porto Alegre and northeast of Alegrete.

== Regional language ==
As is the case in many of its surrounding municipalities, listed below, the Riograndenser Hunsrückisch language is spoken in Mato Queimado since pioneer days and has been intrinsic to its history. Although technically a language, it is commonly referred to as a dialect of the German language. In recent years the Portuguese translation of its name is gaining wider use throughout Brazil: hunsriqueano riograndense (no caps in Port.). However, the majority of estimated three million native speakers of Riograndenser Hunsrückisch in Rio Grande do Sul mostly often refer to their language simply as Deitsch or Hunsrückisch, and the majority of them probably do not recognize the term hunsriqueano, as used in academia and presently more and more in the larger cultural context (i.e. internet, social media, etc.).

The establishment of this community dates back to 1919, and its original settlers were all German Brazilian, as well documented, most originating from the neighboring municipality of Cerro Largo (then called Serro Azul) and some from the eastern Altkolonie (trans.: Old Colony; in Port.: Colônia Velha) region of the state. Therefore, all the founders of the community were native speakers of the variety of Hunsrückisch spoken in the state of Rio Grande do Sul, a Germanic language which is in fact uniquely Brazilian (there are two much smaller pockets of Hunsrückisch speakers in Brazil, located on the Atlantic coast of Santa Catarina state and in the mountains of the state of Espírito Santo).

=== Endangered status ===
Although Riograndenser Hunsrückisch has a relatively large number of native speakers, the vast majority are also being fluent in the national language, many if not the majority of their children are not learning their parents mother tongue. This situation can be observed in Mato Queimado as well as in many localities with a similar profile found throughout the state of Rio Grande do Sul and also in neighboring regions outside the state where the language is spoken. However, there a few notable exceptions, as well documented by published research (See Altenhofen, cited above), affording some stability to this regional language. Nonetheless, given the overall language shift towards the dominant Brazilian language, Hunsrückisch has been officially classified as endangered for quite some time by world languages' monitoring organizations such as Ethnologue.

There are many complex factors and interwoven dynamics that help explain the status quo of this language and its very pronounced lack of social prestige, centrally among them are the specific public policies enacted by Brazil's dictator Getúlio Vargas during II World War with his Nationalization Campaign, the Campanha de Nacionalização, which aimed aggressively at the eradication non-autochthonous minority languages both from public as well as privet life. Long after Vargas' linguistic legislation was officially suspended, its effect can still be observed among members of communities such as Mato Queimado (See Stigma management).

== Neighbouring municipalities ==
- Cerro Largo
- Guarani das Missões
- Caibaté
- Rolador

== See also ==
- List of municipalities in Rio Grande do Sul
