= Estanislau Amadeu Kreutz =

Brazilian Catholic bishop (1928–2014)

- Bishop of Santo Ângelo
- Church: Catholic Church
- Diocese: Diocese of Santo Ângelo
- In office: 21 December 1973 – 15 June 2004
- Predecessor: Aloísio Lorscheider
- Successor: José Clemente Weber
- Previous posts: Titular Bishop of Maronana (1972-1973); Auxiliary Bishop of Santo Ângelo (1972-1973)

Orders
- Ordination: 28 November 1954
- Consecration: 17 September 1972 by Aloísio Lorscheider

Personal details
- Born: 1 July 1928 Santo Ângelo (present-day Santo Cristo), São Pedro do Rio Grande do Sul, Republic of the United States of Brazil
- Died: 6 July 2014 (aged 86)

Estanislau Amadeu Kreutz (July 1, 1928 – July 6, 2014) was a Catholic bishop.

Ordained to the priesthood in 1954, Kreutz was named titular bishop of Maranana and auxiliary bishop of the Catholic Diocese of Santo Angelo, Brazil in 1972. In 1973, he was named diocesan bishop of the Santo Angelo Diocese and retired in 2004.
