= Caibaté =

Municipality of Rio Grande do Sul, Brazil

- Municipality
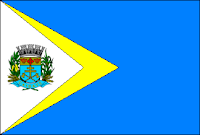
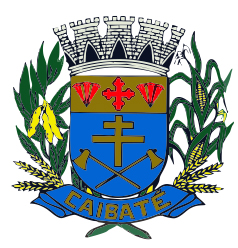
- Flag Coat of arms

- Location in Rio Grande do Sul state

- Location in Brazil
- Coordinates: 28°17′16″S 54°38′16″W
- Country: Brazil
- State: Rio Grande do Sul

Area
  - Total: 259.66 km^{2} (100.26 sq mi)
- Elevation: 286 m (938 ft)

Population (2020)
  - Total: 4,823
  - Density: 18.57/km^{2} (48.11/sq mi)
- Time zone: UTC−3 (BRT)
- Postal code: 97930-xxx
- Website: www.caibate.rs.gov.br

Caibaté is a municipality of the state of Rio Grande do Sul, Brazil. The population is 4,823 (2020 est.) in an area of 259.66 km^{2}. The name comes from the Tupi language. It is located 524 km west of the state capital of Porto Alegre, northeast of Alegrete.

== Bounding municipalities ==
- Mato Queimado
- Guarani das Missões
- Vitória das Missões
- São Luiz Gonzaga
- Rolador

== See also ==
- List of municipalities in Rio Grande do Sul
