= Catuípe =

Municipality of Rio Grande do Sul, Brazil

- Municipality
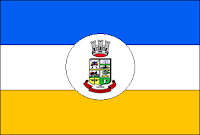
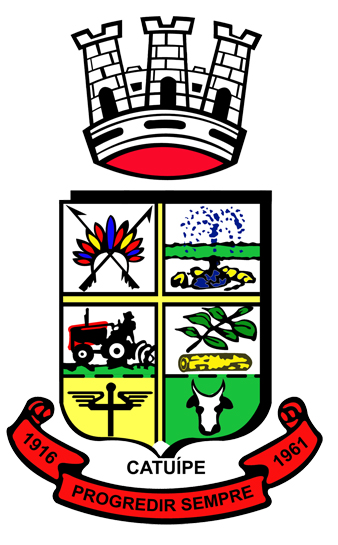
- Flag Coat of arms

- Location in Rio Grande do Sul state

- Location in Brazil
- Coordinates: 28°15′0″S 54°0′43″W
- Country: Brazil
- State: Rio Grande do Sul
- Micro-region: Santo Ângelo

Area
  - Total: 583.26 km^{2} (225.20 sq mi)

Population (2020)
  - Total: 8,701
  - Density: 14.92/km^{2} (38.64/sq mi)
- Time zone: UTC−3 (BRT)
- Website: www.catuipe.rs.gov.br

Catuípe is a municipality of the western part of the state of Rio Grande do Sul, Brazil. The population is 8,701 (2020 est.) in an area of 583.26 km^{2} (225.20 sq mi). Its nickname is Land of Spring Water for the springs located around the municipality. It is located 419 km west of the state capital of Porto Alegre, northeast of Alegrete.

== Bordering municipalities ==
- Santo Ângelo
- Giruá
- Independência
- Inhacorá
- Chiapeta
- Ijuí
- Coronel Barros
- Entre-Ijuís

== See also ==
- List of municipalities in Rio Grande do Sul
