= Entre-Ijuís =

Municipality of Rio Grande do Sul, Brazil

- Municipality
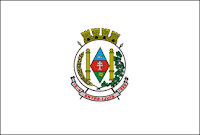
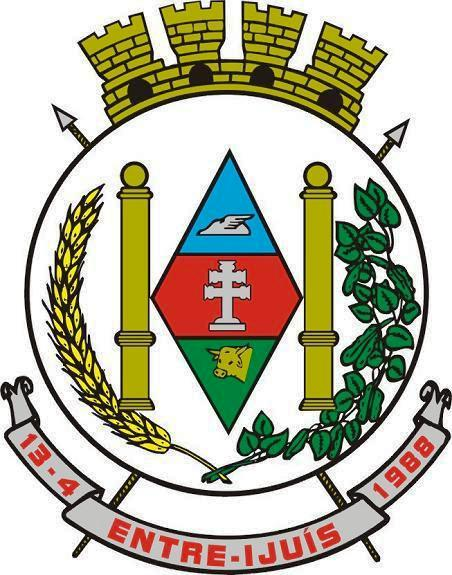
- Flag Coat of arms

- Location in Rio Grande do Sul state

- Location in Brazil
- Coordinates: 28°21′36″S 54°16′4″W
- Country: Brazil
- State: Rio Grande do Sul
- Micro-region: Santo Ângelo

Area
  - Total: 552.60 km^{2} (213.36 sq mi)

Population (2020)
  - Total: 8,411
  - Density: 15.22/km^{2} (39.42/sq mi)
- Time zone: UTC−3 (BRT)

Entre-Ijuís is a municipality of the western part of the state of Rio Grande do Sul, Brazil. The population is 8,938 (according to IBGE 2010 census) in an area of 552.60 km^{2}. It takes its name from the Ijuí Grand River, on which it is situated. It is located 435 km west of the state capital of Porto Alegre, northeast of Alegrete.

== History ==
Entre-Ijuís district is created in 1948, by Municipal Law nº 3 of August 26 of the same year. The municipality of Entre-Ijuís was created by state law nº 8558 of April 13, 1988 year upon majority votes in favor of emancipation on plebiscite held on December 20, 1987, year.

== Bounding municipalities ==
- Santo Ângelo
- Catuípe
- Coronel Barros
- Eugênio de Castro
- São Miguel das Missões
- Vitória das Missões

== See also ==
- List of municipalities in Rio Grande do Sul
