= Vitória das Missões =

Municipality of Rio Grande do Sul, Brazil

- Municipality
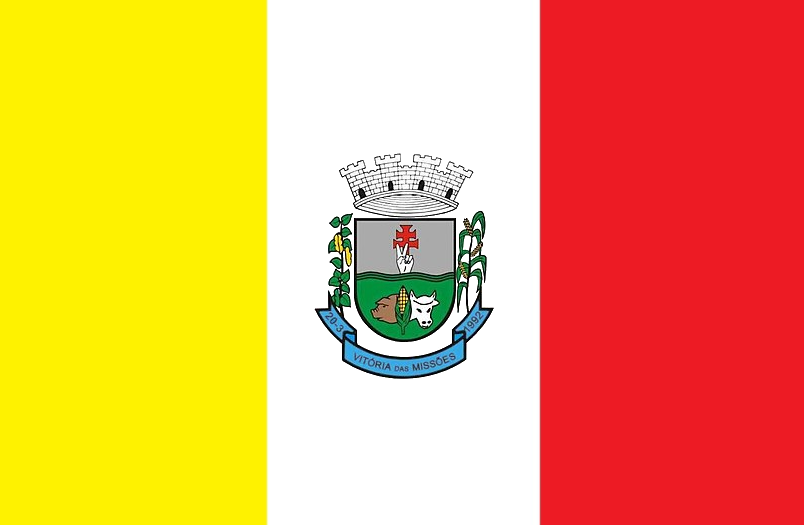
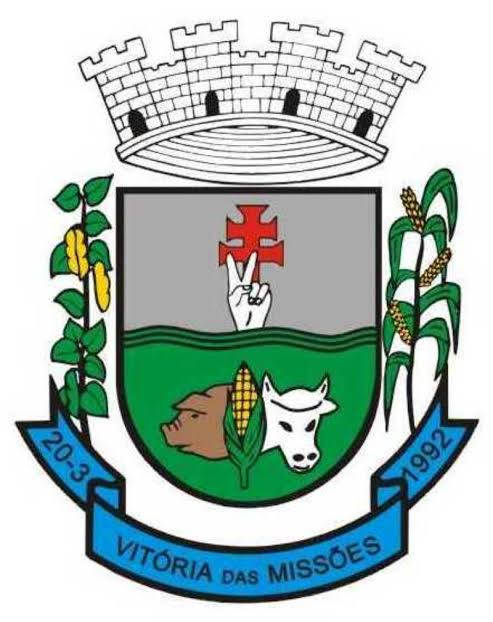
- Flag Coat of arms

- Location in Rio Grande do Sul state

- Location in Brazil
- Coordinates: 28°21′3″S 54°29′45″W
- Country: Brazil
- State: Rio Grande do Sul
- Micro-region: Santo Ângelo

Area
  - Total: 259.61 km^{2} (100.24 sq mi)

Population (2020)
  - Total: 3,092
  - Density: 11.91/km^{2} (30.85/sq mi)
- Time zone: UTC−3 (BRT)
- Website: www.vitoriadasmissoes.rs.gov.br

Vitória das Missões is a municipality in the western part of the state of Rio Grande do Sul, Brazil. The population is 3,092 (2020 est.) in an area of 259.61 km^{2} (100.24 sq mi). It is located 461 km west of the state capital of Porto Alegre, northeast of Alegrete and east of Argentina. Its nickname is "Progress" (Progresso in Portuguese).

== Bounding municipalities ==
- Santo Ângelo
- Entre-Ijuís
- São Miguel das Missões
- Caibaté
- Guarani das Missões

== See also ==
- List of municipalities in Rio Grande do Sul
