= Diocese of Santo Ângelo =

Catholic ecclesiastical territory

Diocese of Santo Ângelo Dioecesis Angelopolitana

Catholic
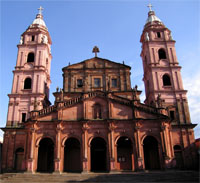
- Guardian Angel Cathedral, Santo Ângelo

Location
- Country: Brazil
- Ecclesiastical province: Santa Maria

Statistics
- Area: 16,776 km^{2} (6,477 sq mi)
- Population: Total; Catholics: (as of 2004); 508,000; 389,000 (76.6%)

Information
- Rite: Latin Rite
- Established: 22 May 1961 (65 years ago)
- Cathedral: Guardian Angel Cathedral

Current leadership
- Pope: Leo XIV
- Bishop: Liro Vendelino Meurer
- Metropolitan Archbishop: Hélio Adelar Rubert
- Bishops emeritus: José Clemente Weber

Website
- www.diocesedesantoangelo.org.br

The Roman Catholic Diocese of Santo Ângelo (Latin: Dioecesis Angelopolitana) is a diocese located in the city of Santo Ângelo in the ecclesiastical province of Santa Maria in Brazil.

== History ==
- 22 May 1961: Established as Diocese of Santo Ângelo from the Diocese of Uruguaiana

== Bishops ==
- Bishops of Santo Ângelo (Roman rite), in reverse chronological order
  - Bishop Liro Vendelino Meurer (2013.04.24 - present)
  - Bishop José Clemente Weber (2004.06.15 – 2013.04.24)
  - Bishop Estanislau Amadeu Kreutz (1973.12.21 – 2004.06.15)
  - Bishop Aloísio Lorscheider, O.F.M. (1962.02.03 – 1973.03.26), appointed Archbishop of Fortaleza, Ceara in 1973 (Cardinal in 1976)

=== Auxiliary bishop ===
- Estanislau Amadeu Kreutz (1972-1973), appointed Bishop here
