= Constantina, Rio Grande do Sul =

Municipality of Rio Grande do Sul, Brazil

Coordinates: 27°44′S 52°59′W

Constantina
- Municipality
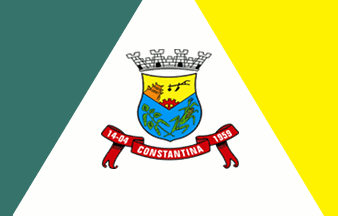
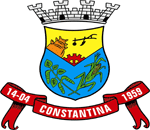
- Flag Coat of arms
- Motto: "Celeiro da Hospitalidade"
- Location of Constantina in Rio Grande do Sul
- Country: Brazil
- Region: South
- State: Rio Grande do Sul
- Mesoregion: Noroeste Rio-Grandense
- Microregion: Frederico Westphalen
- Founded: 14 April 1959

Government
  - Mayor: Fidelvino Menegazzo (PDT, 2021 - 2024)

Area
  - Total: 203.614 km^{2} (78.616 sq mi)

Population (2021)
  - Total: 9,903
  - Density: 48.64/km^{2} (126.0/sq mi)
- Demonym: Constantinense
- Time zone: UTC−3 (BRT)
- Website: Official website

Constantina, Rio Grande do Sul is a municipality in the state of Rio Grande do Sul, Brazil. Founded April 14, 1959. The municipality's motto is "Celeiro da Hospitalidade", meaning "Barn Hospitality".

== Geography ==
It is a municipality that is part of the microregion of Frederico Westphalen. It is located at latitude 27º44'05 "South and longitude 52º59'32" West, with an altitude of 501 meters.

It has an area of 278.54 km^{2} and its estimated population in 2020 was 9,907 inhabitants.

== See also ==
- List of municipalities in Rio Grande do Sul
