= Cyro Pestana =

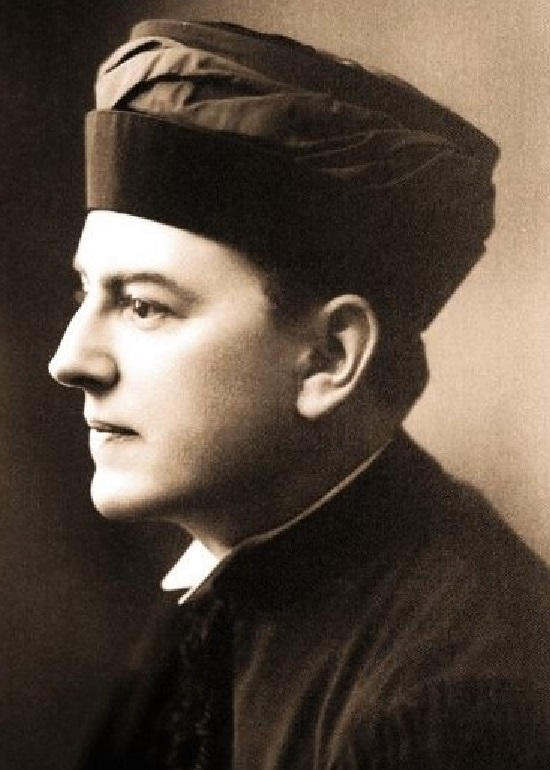
Justice Cyro Pestana

Cyro Pestana (Porto Alegre, November 17, 1898 — Porto Alegre, May 1, 1982) was a Brazilian jurist and magistrate.

Son of the Brazilian republican leader Augusto Pestana and great-grandson of the Italian opera singer Gaetano Ricciolini, Pestana graduated in 1919 from the National Law School of Rio de Janeiro.

He began his career as a judge in the State of Rio Grande do Sul in the early 1920s. He was the chief judicial authority in the legal districts of São Sebastião do Caí, Soledade, São Gabriel, São Vicente do Sul, São Borja, Cachoeira do Sul, Santa Maria and Porto Alegre. Pestana was appointed Justice of the Rio Grande do Sul Supreme Court in 1952 and Chief Justice of the Regional Electoral Court in 1961.

Pestana achieved notoriety in Brazil because of the legal procedures regarding the nationalization policies of Governor Leonel Brizola from 1959 to 1963. He retired from the State Supreme Court in 1968. The Brazilian engineer and corporate leader João Augusto Chagas Pestana (1936-2020), first Chairman of the Board of the power utility Rio Grande Energia, was his son.
