= Augusto Pestana (politician) =

Brazilian politician

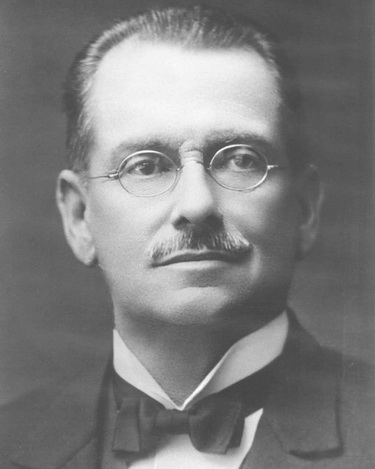
- Augusto Pestana

Personal details
- Born: May 22, 1868 Rio de Janeiro, Brazil
- Died: May 29, 1934 (aged 66) Rio de Janeiro, Brazil
- Party: PRR

Augusto Pestana (May 22, 1868 – May 29, 1934) was a Brazilian engineer and politician. Born in Rio de Janeiro, Pestana moved in the late 1880s to Rio Grande do Sul, Brazil's southernmost state, where he would become a specialist in railroad engineering and public administration, as well as one of the main leaders of the Republican Party of Rio Grande do Sul (PRR).

== Background ==
Augusto Pestana was born on May 22, 1868, in Rio de Janeiro, then capital of the Empire of Brazil, to Manuel José Pestana, a civil servant of the Brazilian Imperial Household and to Januária de Abreu Pestana, daughter of a customs officer. Both his parents were of Portuguese heritage and belonged to middle-class families established in Rio de Janeiro at the time of the transfer of the Portuguese Court to Brazil in 1808.

In spite of his conservative and devout Catholic upbringing, the young Pestana was an avid reader of the French philosopher Auguste Comte and joined, much to the chagrin of his father, the Brazilian republican and positivist movement, which would contribute to overthrow the monarchy in 1889.

Manuel José Pestana died on August 27, 1883, leaving the fifteen-year-old Augusto Pestana to care for his mother and his four younger sisters. The Brazilian Imperial House wanted to help the family and offered Pestana a scholarship at the Pedro II School and at a university of his choice. He politely refused the offer and explained to Isabel, Princess Imperial of Brazil that, as a Republican, "one could not accept any favors from the Crown". Pestana would instead teach Portuguese, History, Geography and Mathematics to fund his own studies at the Escola Politécnica do Rio de Janeiro, Brazil's oldest Engineering school, from which he would earn a degree of civil engineer at age 20, the youngest in his class.

== Early career in Rio Grande do Sul ==
A few months after graduation, Pestana accepted an invitation to move to Rio Grande do Sul in order to work as an engineer of the State commission responsible for the Porto Alegre-Uruguaiana railway connection. The job would acquaint him with the peculiar politics of Rio Grande do Sul within the newly founded Brazilian Republic, uniquely fashioned by the Comte-inspired dictatorship of Governor Júlio de Castilhos. Pestana would also witness the Riograndense civil war of 1893-1895, one of the bloodiest conflicts in Brazilian history. Castilhos appointed him Director for State waterways in 1897 and for telegraphy lines in 1898.

== Director and Mayor of Ijuí ==
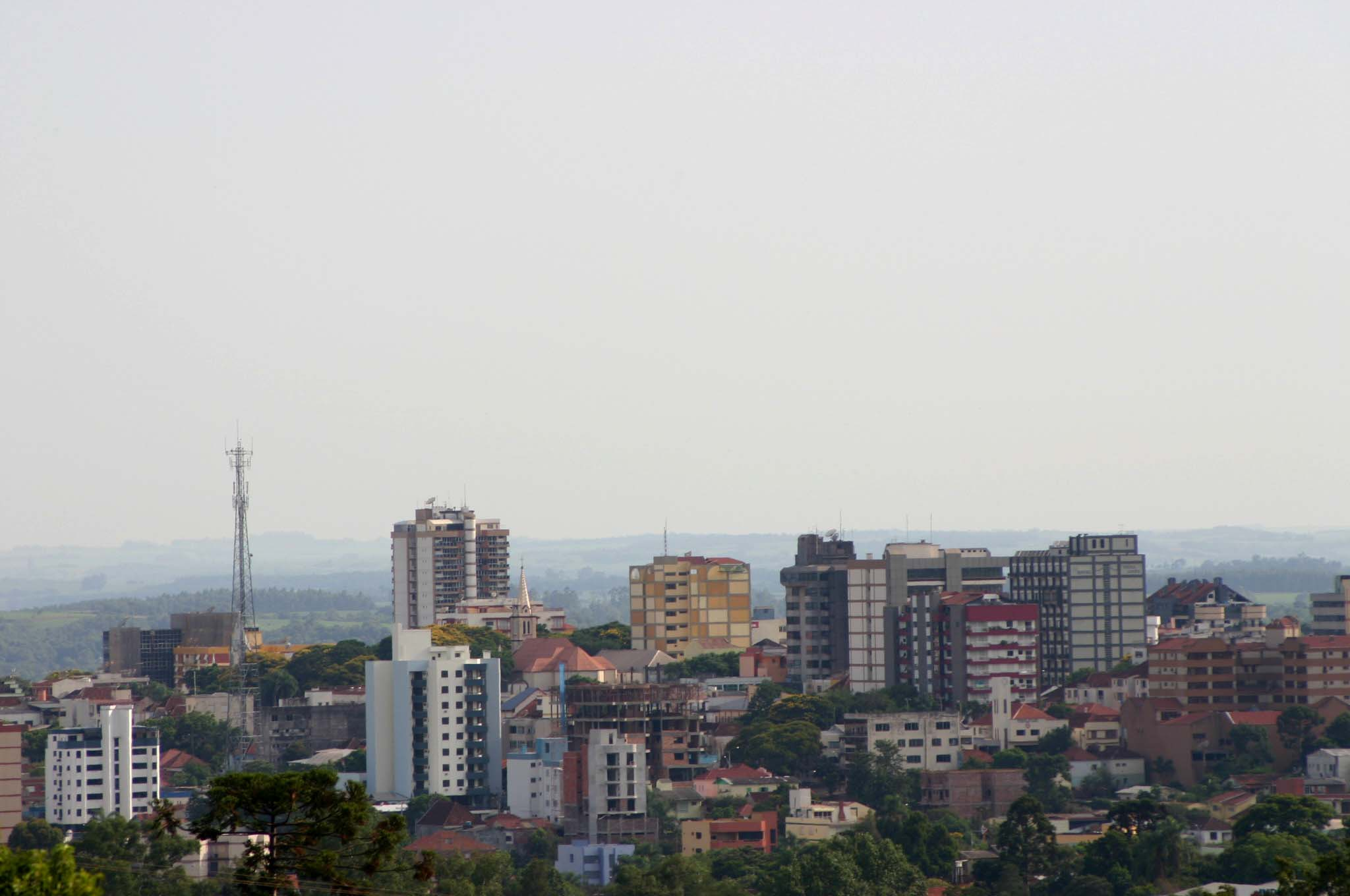
View of Ijuí

In December 1898, Pestana was appointed by the State government as Director of the settlement (colônia) of Ijuí, created in 1890. The settlement was facing then a severe crisis caused by bad management and by quarrels among the more than ten ethnic groups present in the region (mainly Germans, Italians, Portuguese, Poles, Afro-Brazilians, Austrians, Swedes, Spaniards, Latvians and Arabs).

Upon his arrival in early 1899, Pestana gathered the leaders of all immigrant communities in a place currently known as Union Hill (Alto da União) and managed to pacify them. He rationalized the policy of rural settlements, favoring families with previous experience in agriculture, and attached priority to investments in education and infrastructure, helping to diversify the economy of Ijuí'.

During Pestana's thirteen-year tenure, the population of Ijuí rose from six thousand to 28 thousand inhabitants. His administration built approximately 200 miles of roads and bridges over all rivers crossing the settlement. 16 public schools and 16 private ones were opened, catering for two thousand pupils. Thanks to the environment created by Pestana, the settlement, nearly moribund in 1899, boasted in 1912 more than 100 food factories, 70 shops, 32 grist mills, 42 sugar mills, a typography and four hotels. Half of the local production (especially timber, furniture, tobacco, corn and lard) was exported to other areas of Brazil.

The steep demographic and economic growth of the settlement allowed Ijuí to gain political autonomy in 1912. Pestana was the first Mayor of the new municipality, one of the best examples of racial and cultural integration in Southern Brazil.

== Congressman, founder of the Railway Company of Rio Grande do Sul and State Secretary ==
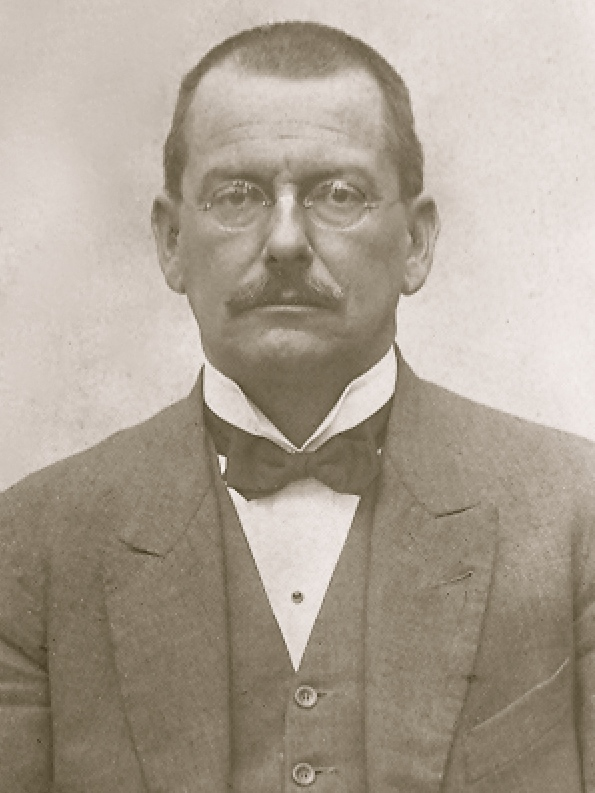
Augusto Pestana in 1917.

After a brief period as Director of the Minas Gerais Western Railway Company (Estrada de Ferro Oeste de Minas), Pestana was elected in 1915 and 1918 to the National Congress of Brazil, representing the RIograndense Republican Party. As a congressman, he advocated new investments in rail transport and criticized the lack of an adequate regulatory framework. In 1920, in a joint effort with the Federal Government, he assured the nationalization of the Belgium-based Compagnie Auxiliaire de Chemins de Fer au Brésil, owned by Percival Farquhar and concessionary of the Riograndense railways since 1905. The Auxiliaire was transformed into the Railway Company of Rio Grande do Sul (VFRGS or Viação Férrea do Rio Grande do Sul), entirely owned by the State Government.

CEO of VFRGS from 1920 to 1926 and State Secretary for Transport and Public Works from 1926 to 1928, Pestana improved the performance of rail transport in Rio Grande do Sul. Notwithstanding another civil war (the "1923 Revolution"), the number of passengers transported by VFRGS rose from 1.1 million in 1920 to 2 million in 1928, while the freight number rose from 640 thousand metric tons to 1 million metric tons in that same period. Pestana forged an efficient management model for VFRGS that lasted until the acquisition of the company by the Brazilian Federal Railway System (Rede Ferroviária Federal) in 1959 and the final demise of passenger rail transport in Brazil in the 1960s and 1970s.

Elected again to the National Congress of Brazil on April 28, 1928, and on March 1, 1930, Pestana did not engage in the Revolution of 1930 in spite of his friendship and political comradeship with President Getúlio Vargas. His last public task was the modernisation of the Porto Alegre harbor in 1932. Pestana died in Rio de Janeiro on May 29, 1934, after a cancer surgery.

== Legacy and family ==
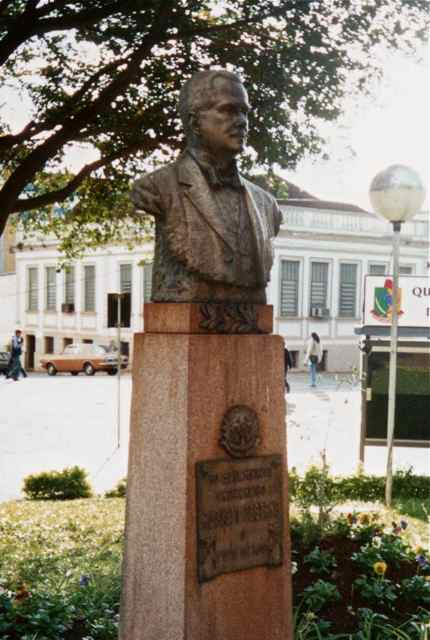
Monument to Augusto Pestana, Republic Square, Ijuí

Deeply influenced by the work of Comte, Pestana was a typical member of the generation that defined the Brazilian Republic of 1889-1930. He provided a decisive contribution to the development of Ijuí and Northwestern Rio Grande do Sul, stressing the importance of robust public policies on infrastructure and education. His name is associated with good governance and honesty, but also with the autocratic rule that characterized Rio Grande do Sul during the governments of Júlio de Castilhos and Borges de Medeiros.

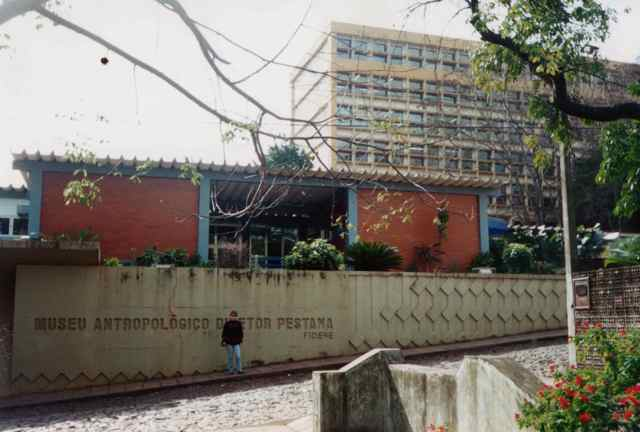
Director Pestana Anthropological Museum, Ijuí

The city of Augusto Pestana, a former district of Ijuí, is named after him, as well as the main museum of Northwestern Rio Grande do Sul (Museu Antropológico Diretor Pestana) and several streets and railway stations throughout Rio Grande do Sul and other Brazilian states.

Pestana married on May 24, 1892, Virgínia da Fontoura Trindade, granddaughter of Antônio Vicente da Fontoura, one of the main leaders of the Riograndense Republic, Special Envoy to the Imperial Court of Rio de Janeiro in 1844 and chief negotiator of the 1845 Peace Treaty of Ponche Verde.

They had ten children, all born and raised in Rio Grande do Sul, including Clóvis Pestana, former Brazilian Minister of Transport and Mayor of Porto Alegre, and Cyro Pestana, Justice of the State Supreme Court. Augusto Pestana is grandfather to the Brazilian engineer and corporate leader João Augusto Chagas Pestana, first Chairman of the Board of the power utility Rio Grande Energia, and great-grandfather to the Brazilian socialist leader Vera Sílvia Magalhães, one of the main figures of the armed resistance against the military dictatorship of 1964-1985, and to Carlos Pestana Neto, former Minister-Chief of Staff of the State Government of Rio Grande do Sul.
