= Giruá =

Municipality of Rio Grande do Sul, Brazil

- Municipality
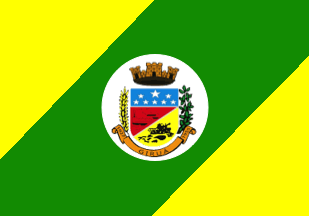
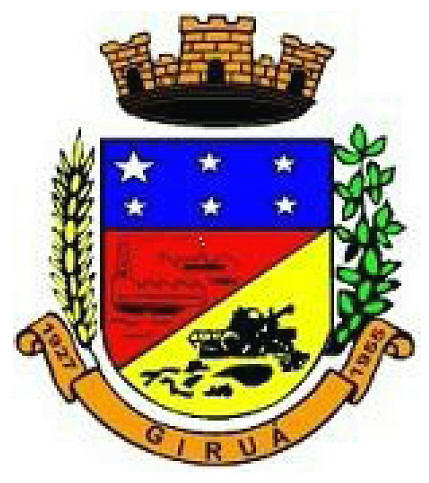
- Flag Coat of arms

- Location in Rio Grande do Sul state

- Location in Brazil
- Coordinates: 28°1′40″S 54°21′0″W
- Country: Brazil
- State: Rio Grande do Sul
- Micro-region: Santo Ângelo

Area
  - Total: 855.92 km^{2} (330.47 sq mi)

Population (2020)
  - Total: 15,863
  - Density: 18.533/km^{2} (48.001/sq mi)
- Time zone: UTC−3 (BRT)
- Website: www.girua.rs.gov.br

Giruá is a municipality in the northern part of the state of Rio Grande do Sul, Brazil. The population is 15,863 (2020 est.) in an area of 855.92 km^{2}. It is located 474 km west of the state capital of Porto Alegre, northeast of Alegrete. It also borders Santa Rosa and Santo Ângelo.

== Bounding municipalities ==
- Santa Rosa
- Três de Maio
- Independência
- Catuípe
- Santo Ângelo
- Sete de Setembro
- Senador Salgado Filho

== Economy ==
Because of its rich volcanic soil, agriculture is important in Giruá, notably soy production. Its nickname is the Capital of Productivity. Other important crops are maize, wheat, sunflower and linseed.

== History ==
The area of Giruá was first inhabited by the Guarani people, and in the 17th century Jesuit missions arrived. The name Giruá comes from jerivá, an indigenous word for the fruit of the butia palm.

== See also ==
- List of municipalities in Rio Grande do Sul
