= João Augusto Chagas Pestana =

Brazilian engineer and business leader (1936–2020)

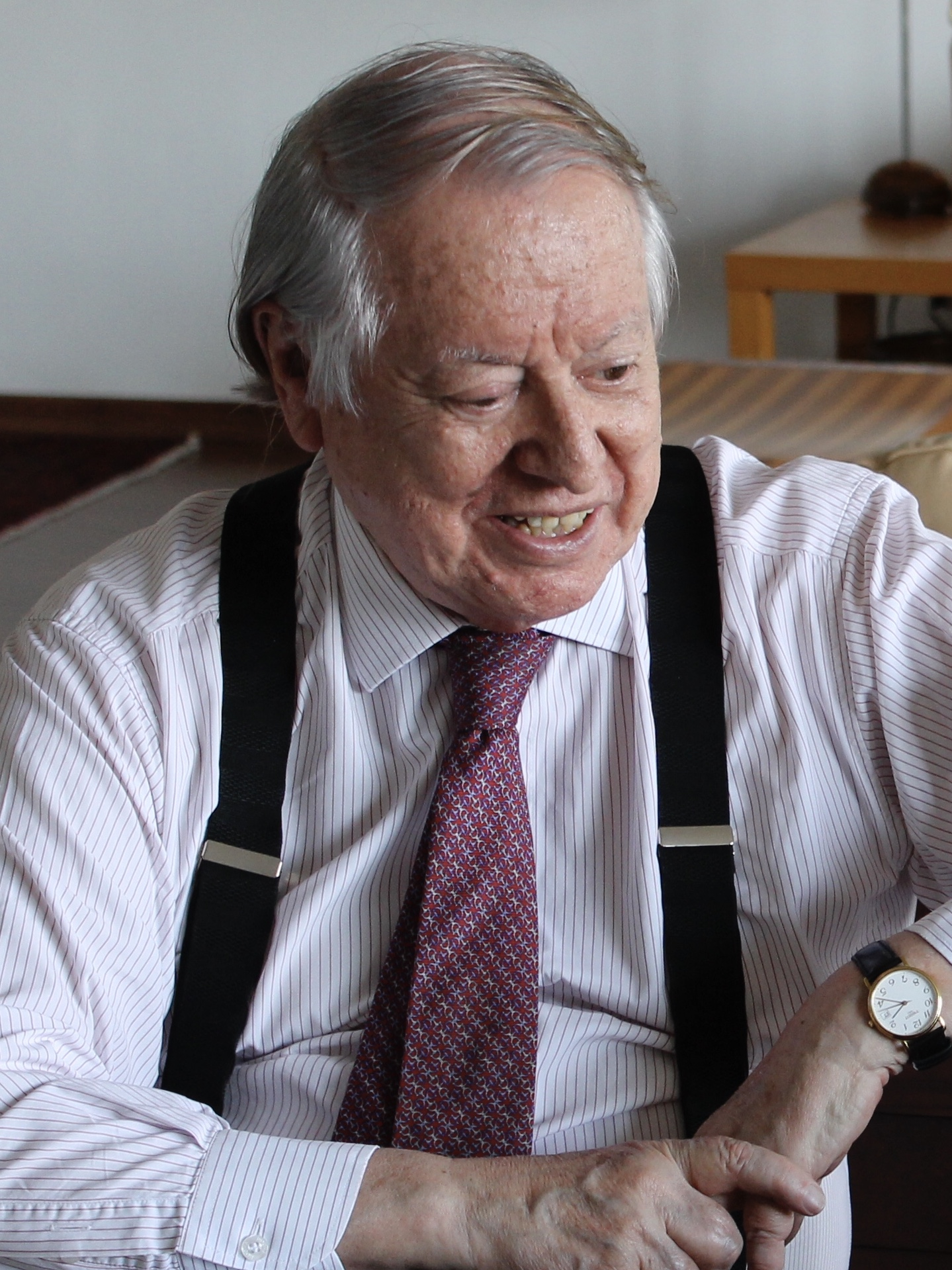
- Pestana in 2012
- Born: March 22, 1936; Cachoeira do Sul, Brazil
- Died: October 26, 2020 (aged 84); São Paulo, Brazil
- Education: Porto Alegre Engineering School (UFRGS)
- Occupations: Engineer and business leader
- Known for: Privatization of Brazil's energy sector at the turn of the 21st century

João Augusto Chagas Pestana (March 22, 1936, in Cachoeira do Sul – October 26, 2020, in São Paulo) was a Brazilian engineer and business leader. A key player in the partial privatization of Brazil's energy sector at the turn of the century, Pestana was the first Chairman of the Board of the company Rio Grande Energia, now part of CPFL Energia (the second largest private Brazilian group of power generation and distribution).

== Early life and education ==
Born in Rio Grande do Sul, Brazil's southernmost state, Chagas Pestana was the son of Cyro Pestana (1898-1982), Justice of the State Supreme Court, and grandson of republican leader Augusto Pestana (1868-1934), first Mayor of Ijuí and founder of the Rio Grande do Sul Railway Company (VFRGS).

He earned admission in 1953 to the Brazilian Naval Academy Preparatory School, located in Angra dos Reis (Rio de Janeiro), but, instead of pursuing a career as an officer in the Brazilian Navy, decided to return home in order to attend the Porto Alegre Engineering School (part of the Federal University of Rio Grande do Sul), from where he graduated in 1960 as a civil engineer. In 1961 he moved to São Paulo, where he later studied business administration at the Fundação Getulio Vargas (FGV-EAESP).

== Career ==
=== Civil engineer in São Paulo (1960-1990) ===
Early in his career, Pestana joined the São Paulo state-owned company Centrais Elétricas de Urubupungá, later absorbed by the Companhia Energética de São Paulo (CESP). From 1964 to 1968, he was one of the pioneering engineers in charge of the construction of the Jupiá Dam.

In the 1970s and 1980s, already in the private sector, he actively participated in the planning or implementation of large infrastructure projects in Brazil and South America, such as the hydroelectric power plants of Ilha Solteira, Tucuruí, Itaipu (Brazil-Paraguay) and Guri (Venezuela), the Angra dos Reis nuclear power plant, the Rio-Niterói bridge and the Imigrantes highway, where he gained recognition as an efficient manager of projects marked by great complexity from both a technical, regulatory and business perspective. At the international level, in addition to Itaipu and Guri, he worked as a senior consultant for energy projects in Argentina, Bolivia, Colombia, Ecuador and Peru.

=== Corporate leader in the energy sector (1990-2010) ===
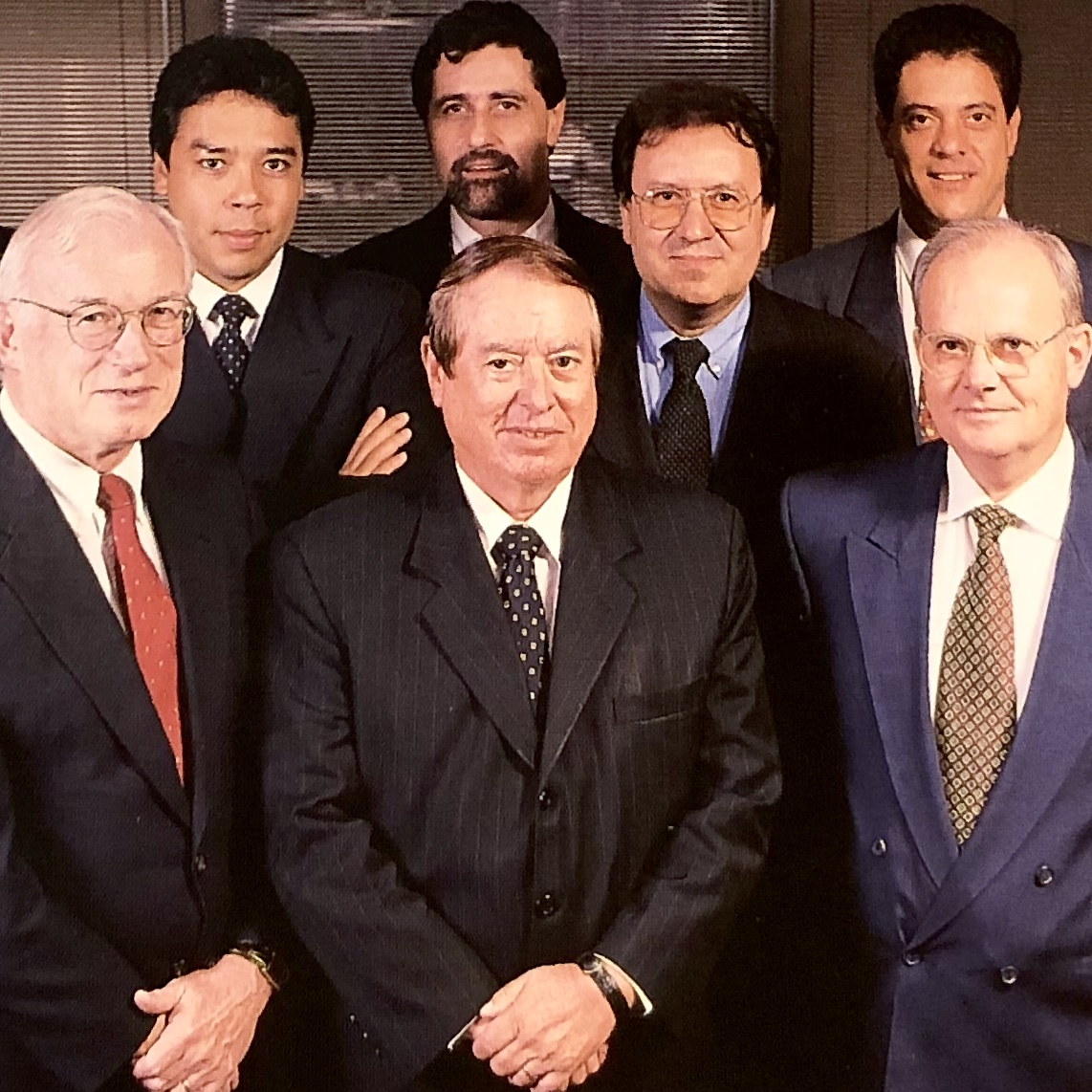
Pestana (center) and the RGE Board (1999)

In the 1990s Pestana became one of the key executives in the modernization and privatization process of the Brazilian power generation and distribution sector. He was director for business development at the joint venture formed by Brazilian private groups Votorantim, Bradesco and Camargo Corrêa (VBC), and negotiated partnership agreements with foreign investors, such as the US energy conglomerate PSEG.

In 1997, after the partial privatization of power distribution in the state of Rio Grande do Sul, he became the first chairman of the board of directors of Rio Grande Energia (RGE), currently the leading utility in the local energy market. According to Roger Agnelli, Bradesco's representative at VBC and later president of mining company Vale, Pestana was “a natural dealmaker, always able to convince and bring shareholders together in order to clinch a good business opportunity”. Upon completing his tenure at the RGE board in 2001, he was succeeded by William J. Budney, former vice-president of PSEG.

As a senior executive of VBC and RGE, Pestana attributed priority to the hydroelectric use of the upper Uruguay River basin, in Southern Brazil. He contributed decisively to the conclusion of four dams in the first half of the 2000s: Itá, Machadinho, Ceran and Barra Grande, with a combined capacity of 3.7 GW (equivalent to a third of the total energy generation in Rio Grande do Sul).
