= Guardian Angel Cathedral, Santo Ângelo =

Guardian Angel Cathedral
- Catedral Anjo da Guarda
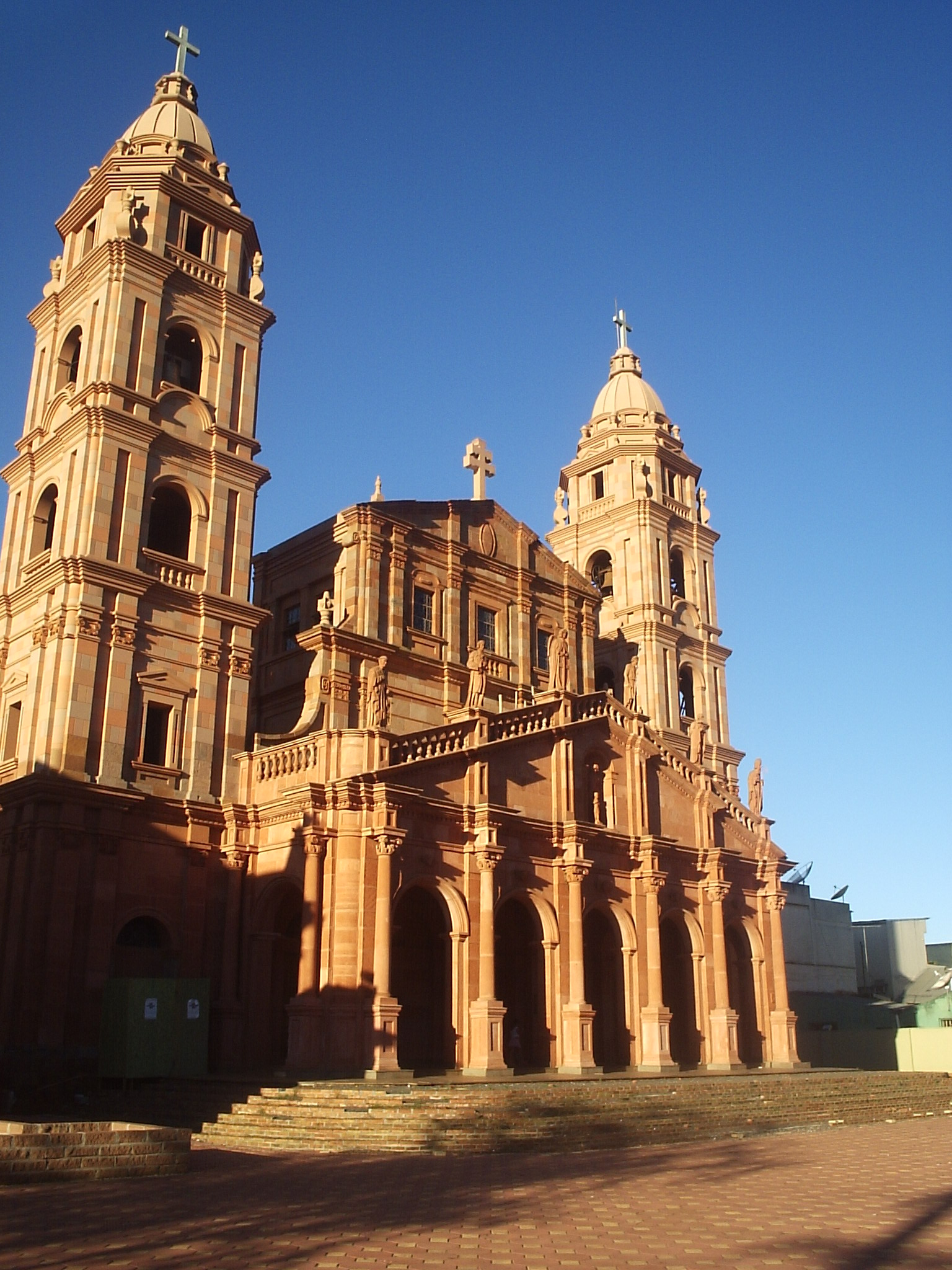
- Guardian Angel Cathedral
- 28°18′18″S 54°15′42″W
- Location: Santo Ângelo, Rio Grande do Sul
- Country: Brazil
- Denomination: Catholic

Administration
- Diocese: Santo Ângelo

Guardian Angel Cathedral (Portuguese: Catedral Anjo da Guarda), also called Angelopolitan Cathedral (Portuguese: Catedral Angelopolitana), is a Roman Catholic cathedral located in Santo Ângelo in the state of Rio Grande do Sul in Brazil. It is the main tourist attraction of the city and the seat of the Diocese of Santo Ângelo.

It began to be constructed by in 1929 and its style resembles the temple of St. Michael the Archangel reduction. His style is neoclassical, with arches, columns, frames and ornamentation.

The idea of replacing the second church by the present cathedral began in 1920. The aim was to build a temple that it take as an example the style of the old church of St. Michael the Archangel reduction. In September 1929 the laying of the foundation stone of the work took place. In 1955, they came to an end the work of the facade of the church, under the direction of sculptor and architect Austrian Valentin Von Adamovich. In 1971 the towers were completed.

== See also ==
- Roman Catholicism in Brazil
- Guardian Angel Cathedral
