= Microregion of Frederico Westphalen =

Coordinates: 27.3589°S 53.3939°W

Frederico Westphalen
- Microregion
- Country: Brazil
- State: Rio Grande do Sul
- Mesoregion: Noroeste Rio-Grandense
- Municipalities: 27

Area
  - Total: 5,182.529 km^{2} (2,000.986 sq mi)

Population (2005)
  - Total: 175,391
  - Density: 34/km^{2} (88/sq mi)

The Microregion of Frederico Westphalen (Brazilian Portuguese: Microrregião de Frederico Westphalen) was one of the Microregions of the Rio Grande do Sul state, in Brazil. It belonged to the mesoregion of the Noroeste Rio-Grandense. Its population was estimated by the IBGE to be of 175,391 in 2005, divided in 27 municipalities. Its total area is 5,182.529 km². The IBGE has since discontinued the microregion system for population tracking, replacing it with the term "immediate geographic region" (Brazilian Portuguese: Região geográfica imediata).

== Municipalities ==
- Alpestre
- Ametista do Sul
- Caiçara
- Constantina
- Cristal do Sul
- Dois Irmãos das Missões
- Engenho Velho
- Erval Seco
- Frederico Westphalen
- Gramado dos Loureiros
- Iraí
- Liberato Salzano
- Nonoai
- Novo Tiradentes
- Novo Xingu
- Palmitinho
- Pinheirinho do Vale
- Planalto
- Rio dos Índios
- Rodeio Bonito
- Rondinha
- Seberi
- Taquaruçu do Sul
- Três Palmeiras
- Trindade do Sul
- Vicente Dutra
- Vista Alegre do Prata
