= Santo Ângelo =

Municipality in the state of Rio Grande do Sul, Brazil

- Municipality
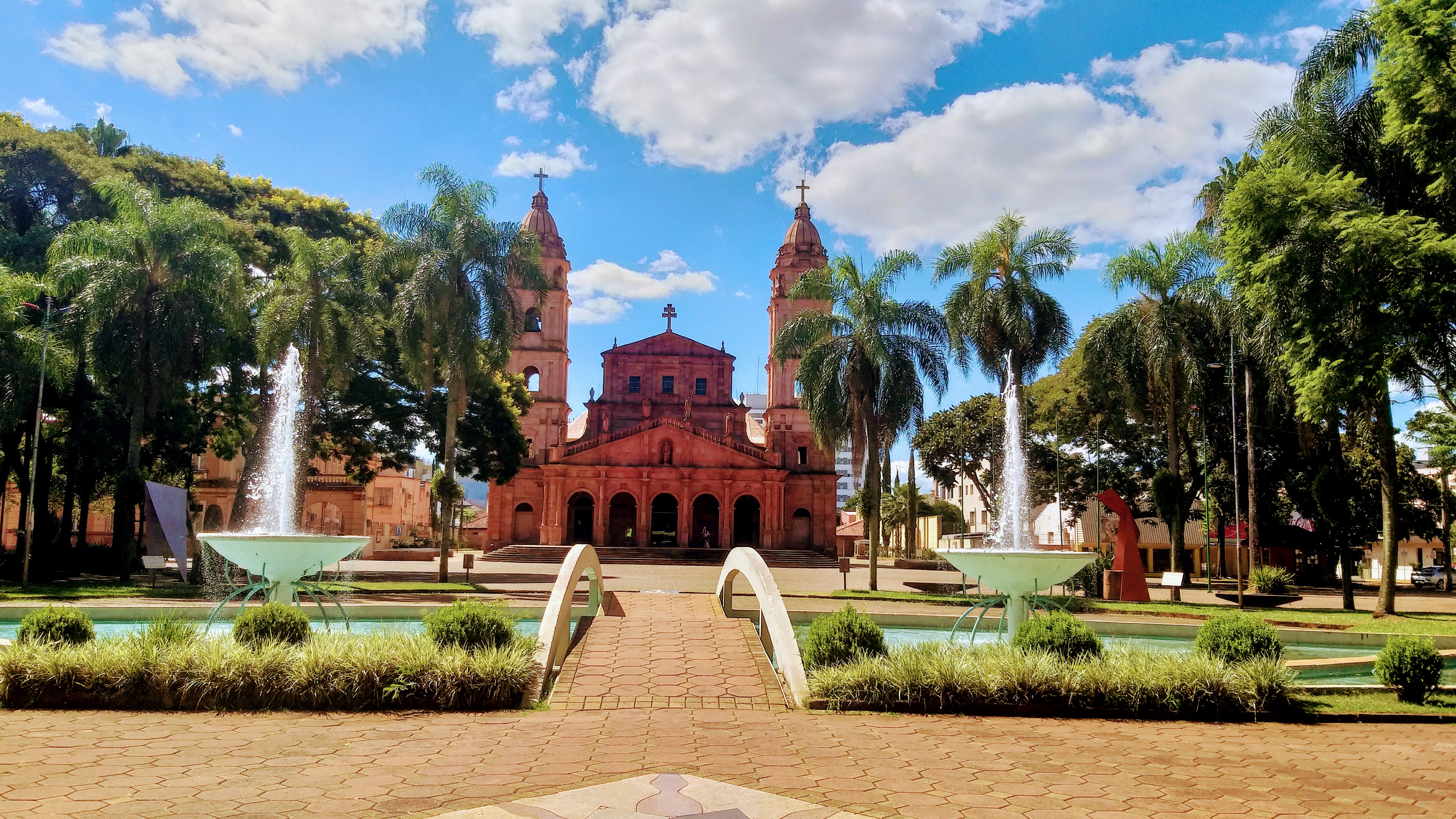
- View of Angelopolitan Cathedral from Pinheiro Machado square

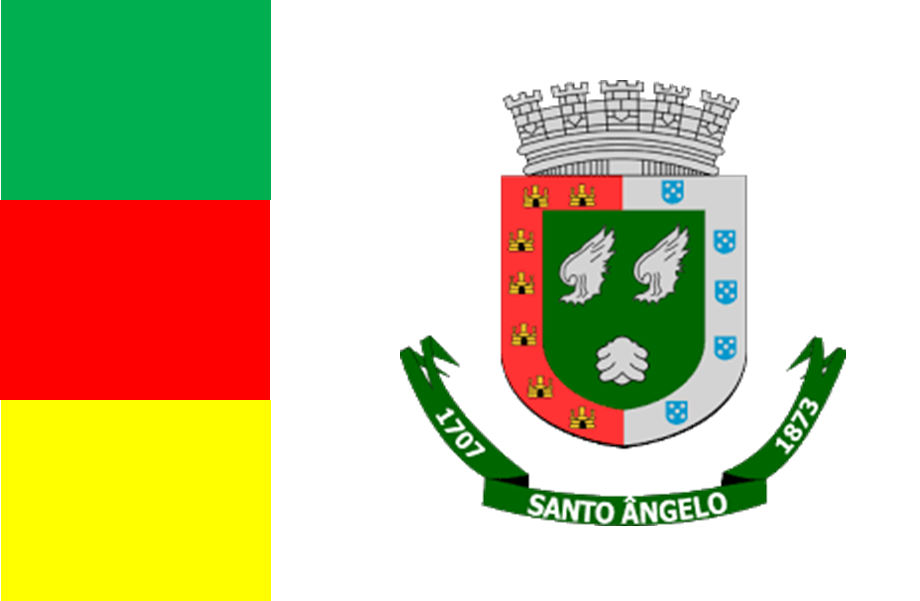
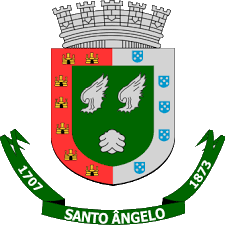
- Flag Coat of arms
- Nickname: Capital of the Missions
- Location in Rio Grande do Sul, Brazil

- Location in Brazil
- Coordinates: 28°17′S 54°15′W
- Country: Brazil
- State: Rio Grande do Sul
- Micro-region: Santo Ângelo
- Founded: 1706

Area
  - Total: 679.34 km^{2} (262.29 sq mi)

Population (2020)
  - Total: 77,568
  - Density: 114.18/km^{2} (295.73/sq mi)
- Demonyms: Santo-Angelense; Angelopolitan
- Time zone: UTC−3 (BRT)
- Website: www.santoangelo.rs.gov.br

Santo Ângelo is a municipality located in northwestern Rio Grande do Sul state, Brazil. It has about 77,568 inhabitants (according to 2020 IBGE estimate) and the total area of the municipality is about 679 km^{2}. It borders Giruá to the north, and Entre-Ijuís to the south—it is linked to Santo Ângelo by the state road RS 344. The city is located 443 km (275 mi) from the state capital, Porto Alegre.

The local agriculture-economy produces and deals soy, corn, wheat, swine, sheep and cattle. Tourism in the city is primarily associated with the city's Jesuit history and the Jesuit Reductions in the nearby city São Miguel das Missões. The Angelopolitan Cathedral in downtown Santo Ângelo is the seat of the Roman Catholic Diocese of Santo Ângelo.

The city is served by Sepé Tiaraju Airport and is home to four institutions of higher education, Universidade Regional Integrada do Alto Uruguai e das Missões (URI), Faculdade CNEC Santo Ângelo, Faculdade Santo Ângelo (FASA) and Instituto Federal Farroupilha (IFFar).

== History ==
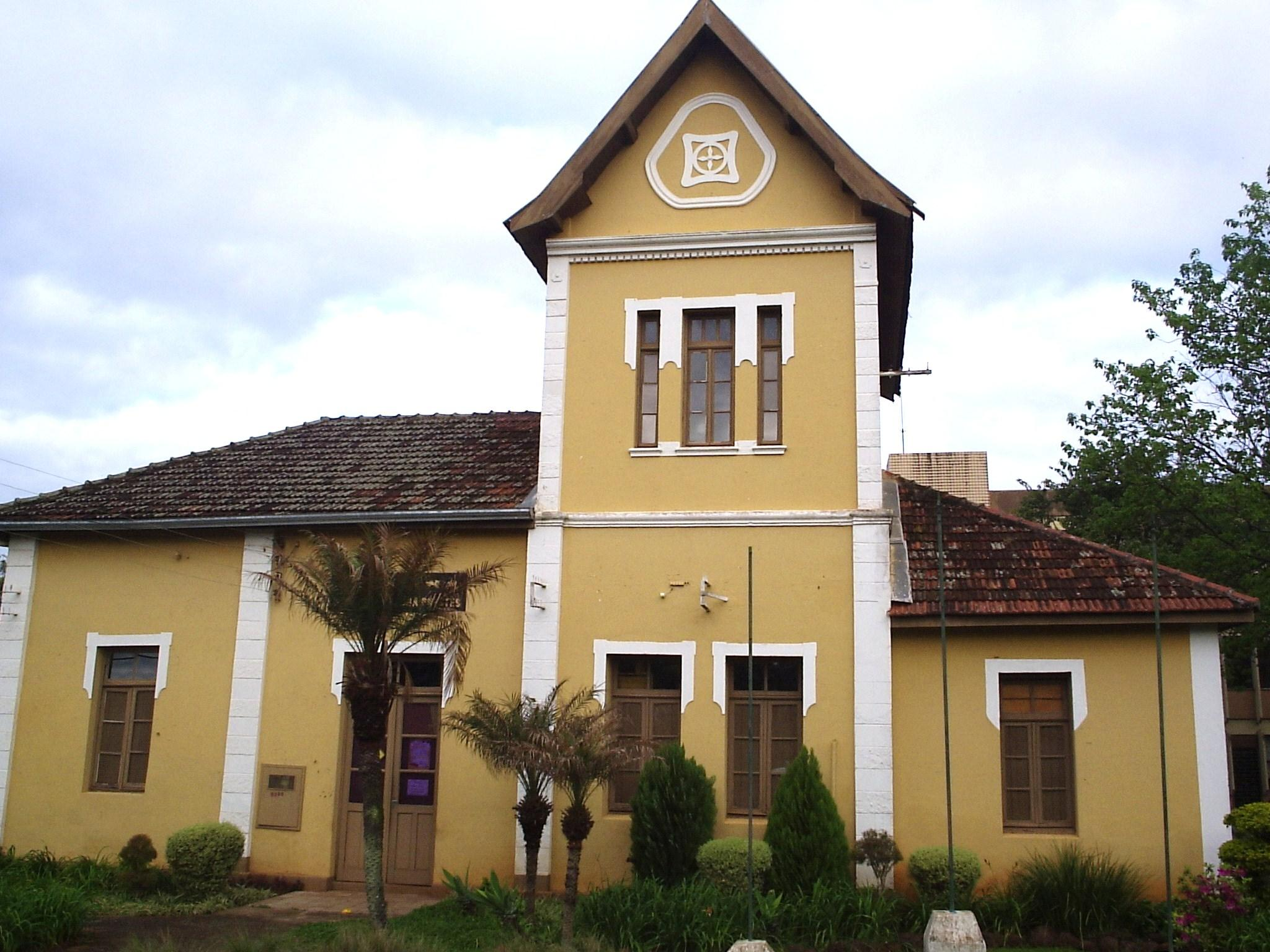
Building of the old train station, where Luís Carlos Prestes planned the Coluna Prestes, nowadays it contains many valuable histprical materials

Santo Ângelo is part of what's called Misiones Orientales and their origins go back to the Spanish period, having part of the thorps being created in the 17th and 18th century by Jesuits priests in what are today Brazil's, Argentina's and Paraguay's territory.

The reduction of Santo Ângelo Custódio (or Sant'Angel Custódio in Spanish) was founded in 1706 by the Belgian jesuit Diogo de Haze. It was the seventh reduction of the group known as the Misiones Orientales. It is believed that firstly the reduction was installed near the bifurcation of the rivers Ijuí e Ijuizinho, and in 1707 it would have been transferred to the current historic center of the city.

The reduction of Santo Ângelo Custódio was consecrated to the Guardian Angel of the Missions, the protector of all the peoples from the missions, therefore it was also called Sant'Angel de la Guardia, as it is written in some Spanish documents of the time. It also had a big economic and cultural development, having almost eight thousand people at its apogee.

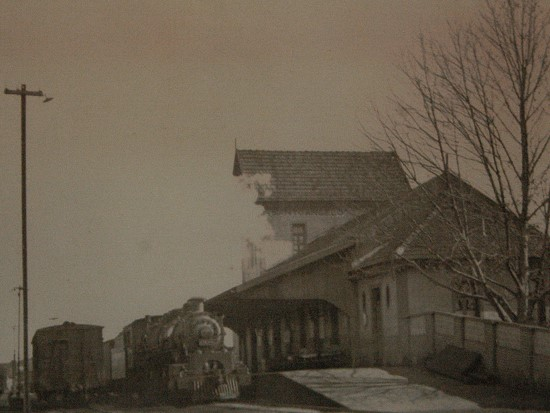
The coming of the train station to the city made a big impulse to the development of the municipality and the region

Destroyed after 1756, in what is called the Guaraní War, the region stayed abandoned for almost a hundred years. By around 1830 the region started to be repopulated because of the sesmarias paulistas. Emancipated from Cruz Alta in 22 March 1873, Santo Ângelo had a big territory, of almost 10 thousand km^{2}.

In the end of the 19th century, big waves of immigrants arrived in Santo Ângelo. Germans, Italians, Poles, Russians, Dutchs, Latvians and many other groups coming from Europe. It also was the starting point of the Coluna Prestes, a movement that crossed the country fighting for better social conditions.

During the 20th century, especially between the years of 1930 and 1979, the city showed a big industrial and economic development, coming to almost 90 thousand inhabitants. During the 1980s many emancipations happened, shredding Santo Angelo's territory, and reducing it to less than 10% of the original space. Besides the emancipations, a geral break in the industry caused a lot of emigration.

At the end of the 1990s the city starts a process of ‘resurrection’. the population that was once 90.000 inhabitants subsequently increased, due to the reopening of industries and the attraction of news investments.

== Geography ==
=== Climate ===
It is classified as humid subtropical climate according to the Köppen climate classification (Cfa). The highest temperature recorded was 40 °C on 20 December 2011. Snow is rare, but frost is common in winter.

Santo Ângelo is located on the western slope of the planalto médio rio-grandense, in the northwest mesoregion of Rio Grande do Sul, physiographic zone of the Misiones orientales. It's located in the river Ijuí’s basin. and in the intersection of the coordinates 28°17'56" south latitude and 54°15’46" in the west longitude of Greenwich meridian. It's also 459Km (285,2mi), Porto Alegre.

Its limit is by north is Giruá; by south is Entre-Ijuís and Vitória das Missões; by east and northeast is Catuípe; by west is Guaraní das missões; and northwest is Sete de Setembro

The main courses of water that go through the urban region are the following: Itaquarinchim Stream, Santa Barbara Stream and the São João Stream. Contour Santo Ângelo the rivers Ijuí and Comandaí, those have greater flow and volume of water. Other smaller courses of water, located exclusively in the countryside are the following: Stream Barbosa, Stream Buriti, Stream do Meio, Stream Pessegueiro, Stream Santa Tereza, Stream São José, Sloshing Atafona, Sloshing Barreiro, Sloshing do Cerne, Sloshing Grande, Sloshing Micuim, Sloshing das Pombas, Sloshing da Potranca, Sloshing Shultz e Sloshing das Taipas.

== Culture ==
The municipality contains a rich culture, thanks to the ethnic diversity that got established with the coming of the immigrants to the city. The ethnicities that highlight the most are from German, Italian, Spanish, and Portuguese origin

=== Cultural movements ===
The Centro de Tradições Gaúchas (CTGs, Gaucho's traditions centers) are the main place to locals where the gauchos traditionalists meet to cultivate and to spread the culture. The ethnicities of the municipality also show their traditions through artistic presentations and cultural events.

Military and educational parades are also common on 7 September, and the traditionalistic parade on 20 September, which attract thousands of people to the streets

Santo Ângelo's Cultural Center is an important cultural space for the municipality hosting the Academia Santo Angelense de Letras (ASLE) and the Municipality Historical Archive. Another important cultural spot is the cinema Cine Cisne, which has the biggest screen exhibition of the State.

=== Museums ===
The main museum of the city used to be Museu Municipal Dr José Olavo Machado, located in the historical center. The building was installed in the house of the last intendant, and first mayor of the municipality, Dr Ulysses Rodrigues

There is still the Marechal Rondon Museum, located in the 1st Batalhão de comunicações. Though their collection, the museum tells the story of the most famous indianist of the 20th century, and also Patron of the National Communications, Marechal Cândido Rondon

There is also the railway museum, alongside the Coluna Prestes Memorial which houses objects and pictures of the old train station of the municipality

== Transports and Comunnications ==
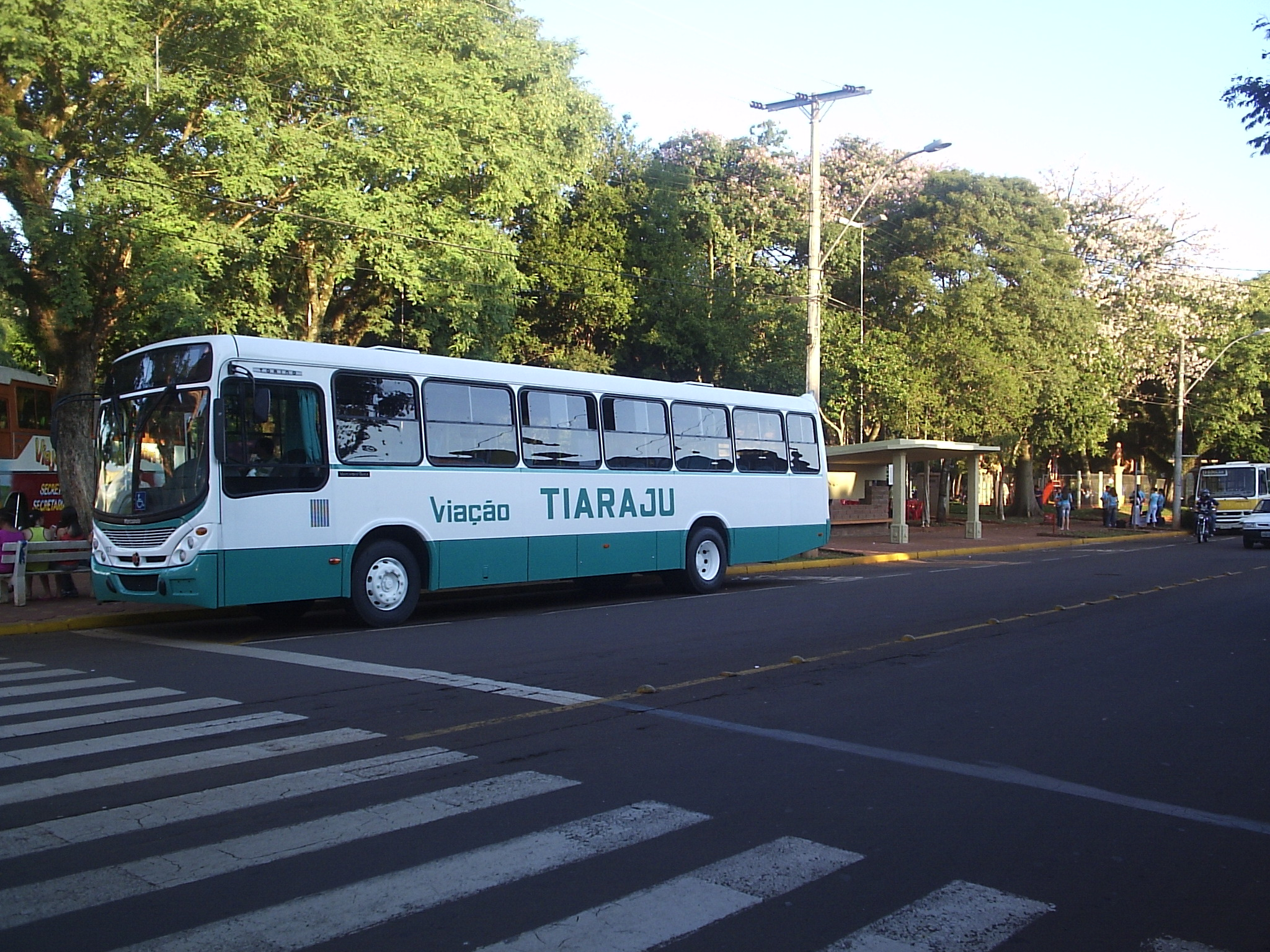
Viação Tiaraju bus

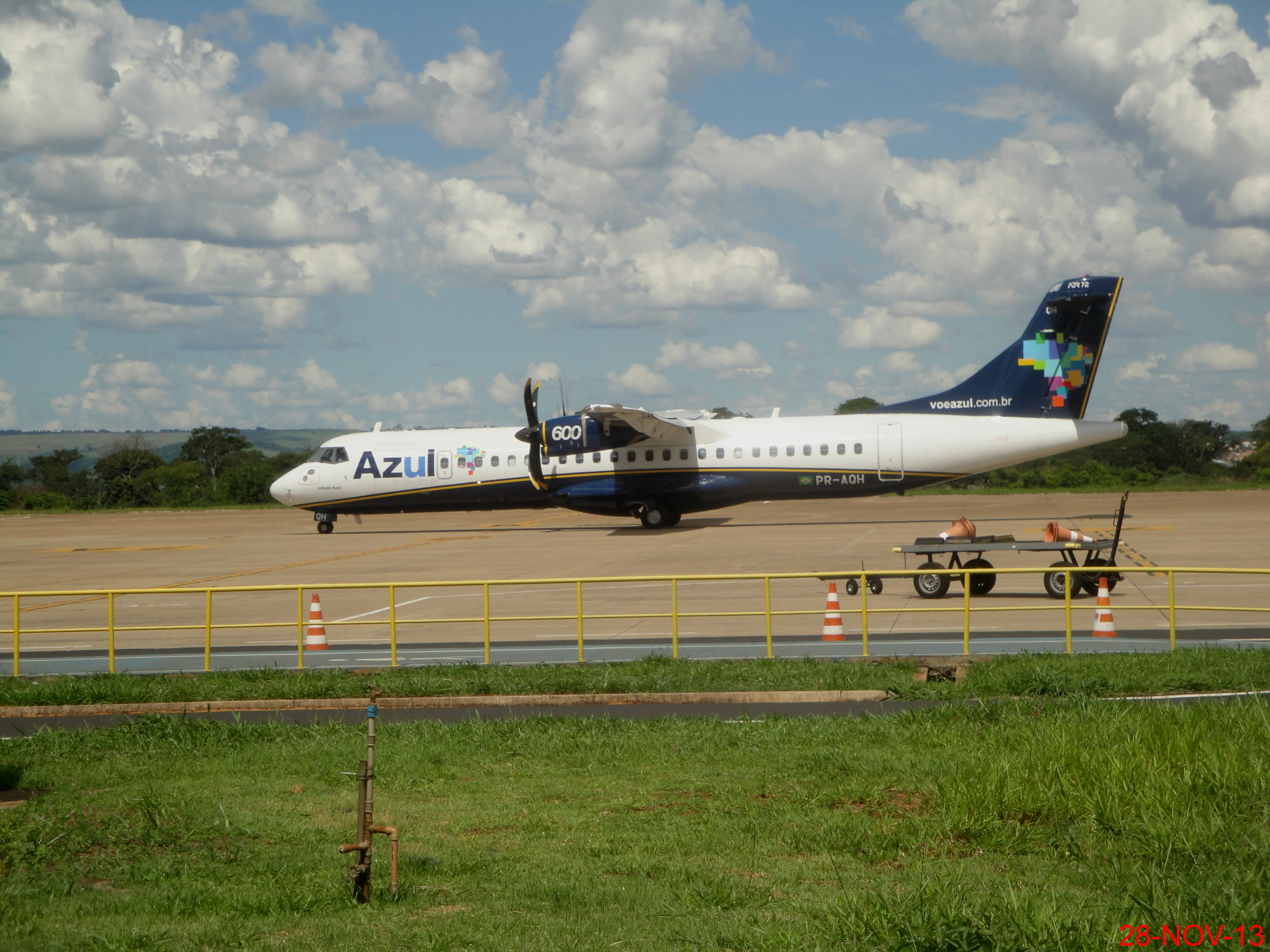
ATR 72 of Azul Linhas Aéreas, which operates the Santo Ângelo and Porto Alegre connection daily

The urban public transport is made by Viação Tiaraju. The main bus routes of the city are Aliança-Casarotto and Pippi-Bus Station. In 2008 were acquired the two first buses for people with physical deficiency, nowaday the business has seven buses with that function.

The Santo Ângelo's Aeroporto Sepé Tiaraju, the main of the region, makes available flights to Porto Alegre through Azul linhas aéreas, and in July 2022 it got the authorization by ANAC to operate with Boeing 737 aircraft

In 18 October 2022 it started to operate, working on Tuesdays, Thursday, and Saturdays, connecting santo angelo and São Paulo in the Guarulhos airport

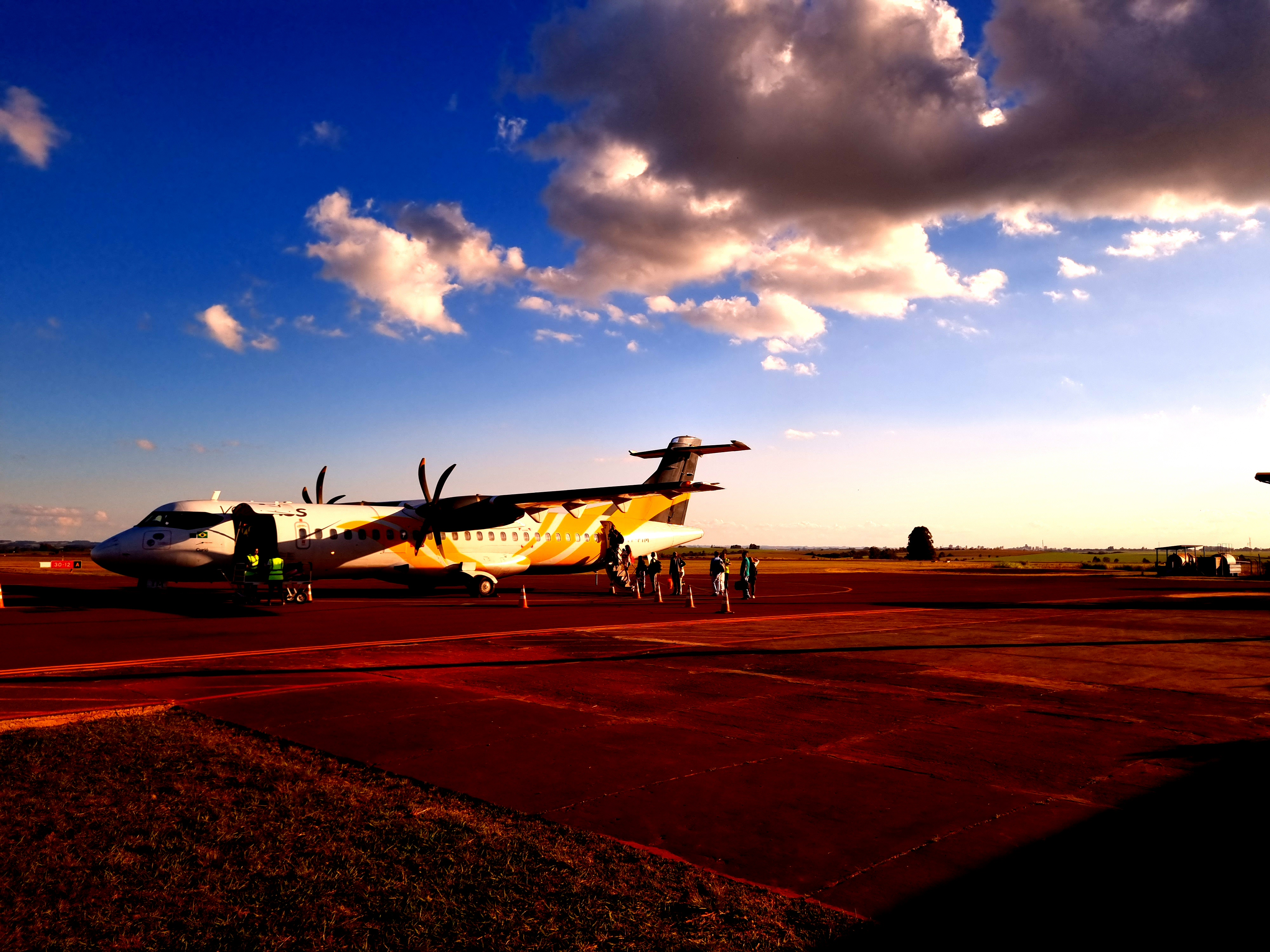
Voepass ATR 72 in the opening flight, connecting Santo Ângelo and Porto Alegre

On June first of 2023, one more operation started, connecting Santo angelo with the capital of the state, Porto alegre by VoePass, with latam's codeshare. Those flights are on Tuesdays, Thursday, and Saturdays,

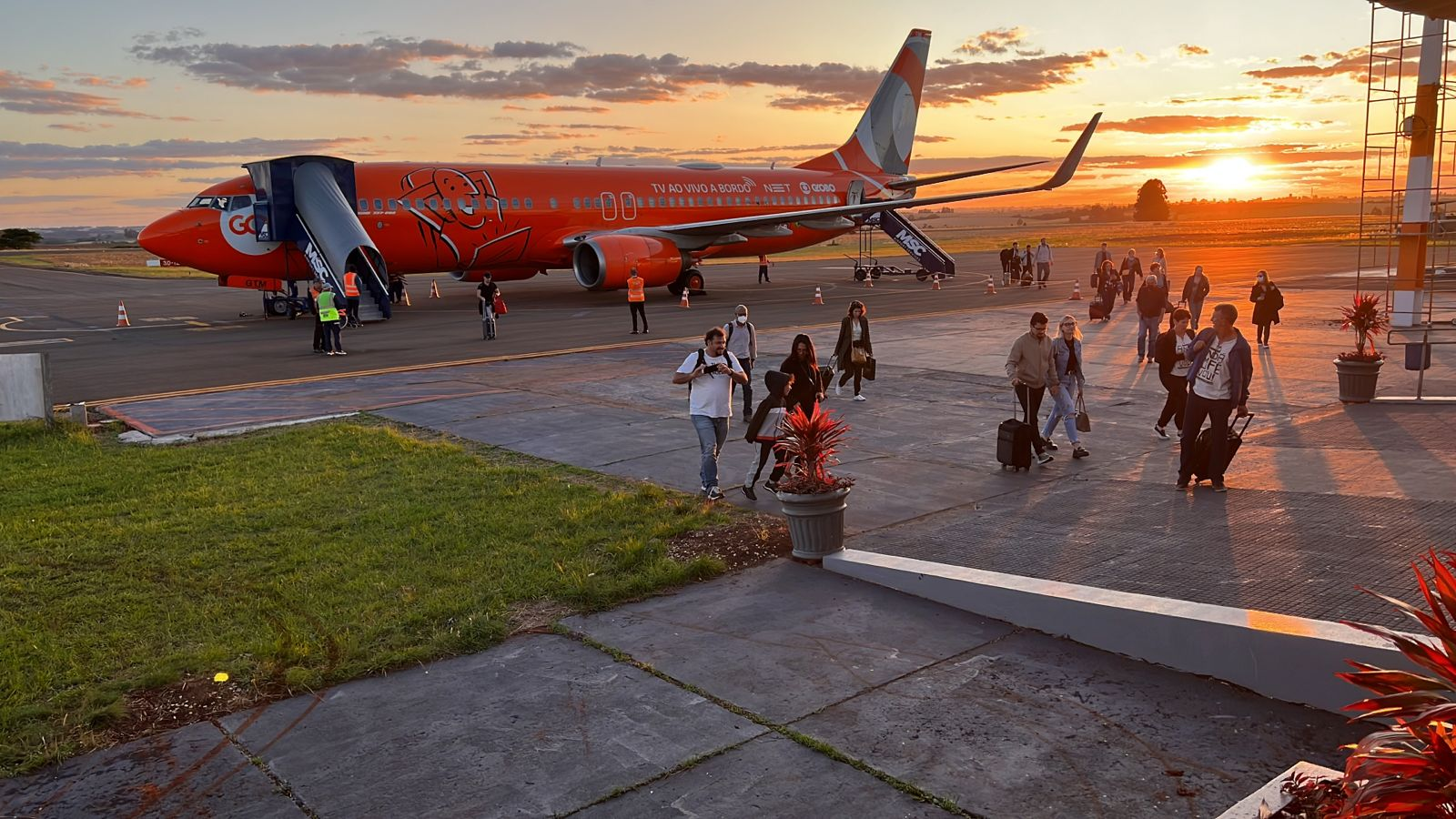
Boeing 737-800 of Gol Linhas Aéreas, from the operation of connecting Santo Ângelo with the Guarulhos' airport in São Paulo

the municipality can be accessed through the highways ERS-218 (Catuipe and Ijui) and ERS-344 that interconnects itself with BR-285 (main way of getting to the capital of the state), BR-392 (Porto Xavier, in the border with Argentina) and BR-472 (Santa Rosa to Alto and Médio Uruguai). Another important way of getting in the city is the BR-210, also known as perimetral norte, in the north of the city.

The main urban roads are Avenida Brasil, Avenida Venâncio Aires, Avenida Getúlio Vargas, Avenida Salgado Filho, Avenida Rio Grande Do Sul, Avenida Sagrada Família, Avenida Ipiranga, Rua Marechal Floriano, Rua Marquês do Herval and Rua Quinze de Novembro.

In the rail mode the municipality is cut by two railway branches: The Cruz Alta branch, and the Santiago-Santo Ângelo BRanch. A few wagons make their way with agricultural products to the port of Rio Grande. The Santiago Branch is deactivated

== Administration ==
The municipal administration is done by the mayor with the help of the municipal secretaries. For the public power to communicate easier with the population, there are representants from communities nucleums of the city and sub-mayors from smaller districts

=== neighborhoods ===
See Also: List of Santo Ângelos Neighborhoods

The city has about 80 burghs. The main ones are Pippi and Dytz burghs, with an exception of the center, That alongside neighbors burs, makes where most of the population lives.

=== Districts ===
See Also: List of Santo Ângelos Districts

The municipality is divided in 14 districts, besides the headquarters. The districts are the following: Buriti, Comandaí, Colônia Municipal, Rincão dos Mendes, Restinga Seca, Lajeado Cerne, Atafona, Ressaca da Buriti, Cristo Rei, Sossego, Rincão dos Roratos, União, Lajeado Micuim e Rincão dos Meotti.

== Regional minority languages ==
- Riograndenser Hunsrückisch German (Germanic origin)
- Mbyá Guaraní language (autochthonous)

== Notable people ==
- Carlos María de Alvear (1789–1852), soldier and statesman
- José Goldemberg (born 1928), physicist

== See also ==
- List of municipalities in Rio Grande do Sul
