= Jóia =

Municipality in Rio Grande do Sul, Brazil

Coordinates: 28°39′S 54°08′W

- Municipality
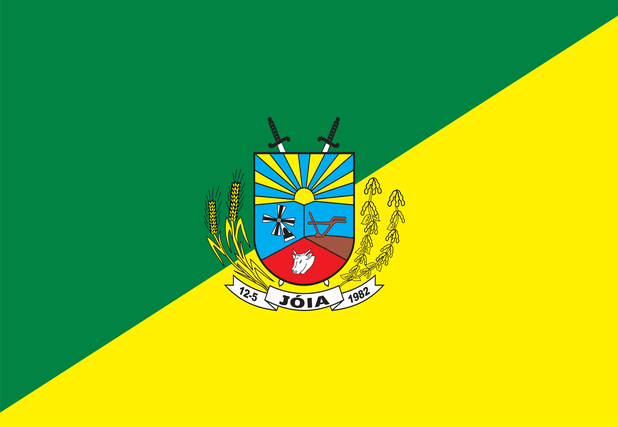
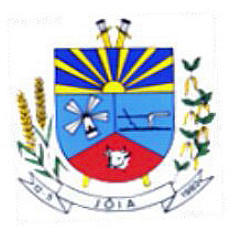
- Flag Coat of arms
- Interactive map of Jóia
- Country: Brazil
- Time zone: UTC−3 (BRT)

Jóia is a municipality in the state of Rio Grande do Sul, Brazil. As of 2020, the estimated population was 8,566.

== See also ==
- List of municipalities in Rio Grande do Sul
