= Alegria, Rio Grande do Sul =

Municipality of Rio Grande do Sul, Brazil

Alegria
- Municipality
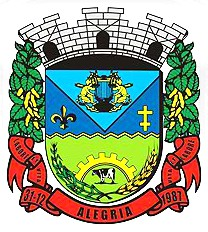
- Flag Coat of arms

- Location in Brazil
- Coordinates: 27°49′S 54°03′W
- Country: Brazil
- Region: South
- State: Rio Grande do Sul
- Founded: 1987

Area
  - Total: 175.28 km^{2} (67.68 sq mi)
- Elevation: 383 m (1,257 ft)

Population (2020)
  - Total: 3,374
  - Density: 24.91/km^{2} (64.5/sq mi)
- Time zone: UTC−3 (BRT)
- Website: http://www.pmalegria.com.br/

Alegria (Portuguese: [a.leˈɡɾi.ɐ]) is a municipality in the state of Rio Grande do Sul, Brazil.

== See also ==
- List of municipalities in Rio Grande do Sul
