= Noroeste Rio-Grandense =

Coordinates: 28.3878°S 53.9150°W

- Mesoregion
- Country: Brazil
- State: Rio Grande do Sul

Area
  - Total: 64,930.583 km^{2} (25,069.838 sq mi)

Population (2005)
  - Total: 1,970,326
  - Density: 30.34511/km^{2} (78.59349/sq mi)

Noroeste Rio-Grandense (English: Northwest of Rio Grande) was one of the seven Mesoregions on the state of Rio Grande do Sul in Brazil. It included 216 municipalities grouped in thirteen microregions. The IBGE has since discontinued the microregion system for population tracking, replacing it with the term "immediate geographic region" (Brazilian Portuguese: Região geográfica imediata).

== Microregions ==
- Carazinho
- Cerro Largo
- Cruz Alta
- Erechim
- Frederico Westphalen
- Ijuí
- Não-Me-Toque
- Passo Fundo
- Sananduva
- Santa Rosa
- Santo Ângelo
- Soledade
- Três Passos
