= Guarani das Missões =

Municipality of Rio Grande do Sul, Brazil

Coordinates: 28°08′S 54°34′W

- Municipality
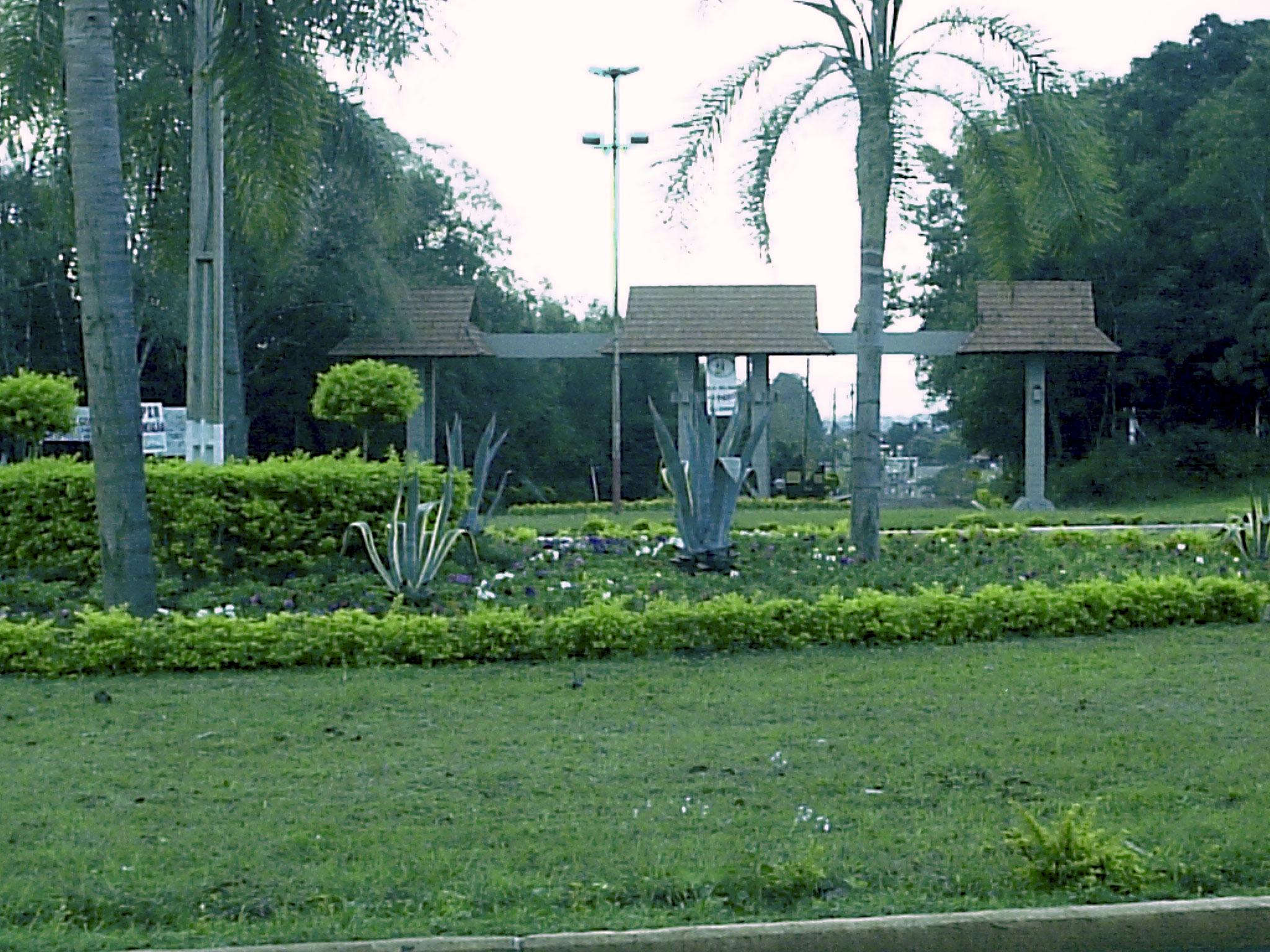
- Entrance of Guarani das Missões

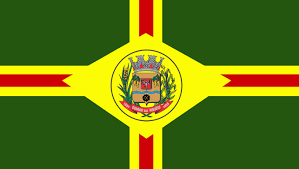
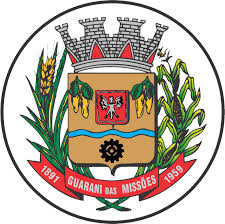
- Flag Coat of arms
- Nickname: Polish Capital of the Gauchos
- Motto(s): Uma cidade com muita história, pra você viver a sua
- Location of Guarani das Missões in Rio Grande do Sul
- Country: Brazil
- Region: South
- State: Rio Grande do Sul
- Mesoregion: Noroeste Rio-Grandense
- Microregion: Cerro Largo
- Founded: 27 May 1959

Government
  - Mayor: Bertíl Nilsson (PDT, 2021 - 2024)

Area
  - Total: 290.496 km^{2} (112.161 sq mi)

Population (2020)
  - Total: 7,463
  - Density: 25.69/km^{2} (66.54/sq mi)
- Demonym: Guaraniense
- Time zone: UTC−3 (BRT)
- Website: Official website

Guarani das Missões is a municipality in the state of Rio Grande do Sul, Brazil.

Guarani das Missões calls itself the Polish Capital of Rio Grande do Sul because it was settled primarily by Polish immigrants, starting over one century ago. The Polish language is still spoken and is maintained as a unique regionalism, alongside the national language, Portuguese.

== History ==
Guarani das Missões began as a Jesuit reduction settlement east of the Uruguay River. In 1891 the federal government and colonial commission of Brazil assessed and divided the land for colonization. The land originally consisted of two centers, one on the banks of the Uruguay River and one further into the interior of the country on the banks of the Comandaí River. The colony on the banks of the Uruguay would become the modern municipality of Porto Lucena whereas the land close to the Comandaí would be foundation for Guarani das Missões. Revolutions in Brazil between 1894 and 1897 had caused a delay in the colonization of the region, with just an estimated 1,200 inhabitants between the Uruguay and Comandaí colonies. The early settlers were ethnically diverse, with Swedes being the first to arrive. They were followed by Poles, Germans, Italians, Russians, Portuguese, Czechoslovaks, Austrians, Spaniards, Ukrainians and others soon after. Poles began to become prominent in Guarani das Missões around 1900, around the same time that the colony began increased construction and surveyance of the land.

Between 1911 and 1959 Guarani das Missões was a district within the municipality of São Luiz Gonzaga. It name was changed several times during this time period, first being named Guarani then becoming the Colônia Guarani and then simplifying to just Guarani again, before undergoing a complete change to Guaramano. It finally became Guarani das Missões in 1950 and separated as its own municipality in 1959.

In 2022 the city made Polish a co-official language, and in 2023 it made Talian a co-official language.

== Demographics ==
Called the Polish capital of Rio Grande Do Sul, the majority of the population is descended from Polish settlers. Today residents still celebrate an annual PolFest in celebration of Polish colonization and immigration. The festival consist of live music, a beauty queen contest, Polish cuisine, and locally made Miętówka, a kind of mint liquor that was brought by Polish immigrants. In addition to the large Polish descended population, a majority of the population is Catholic with a monument to Pope John Paul II and a shrine dedicated to Our Lady of Czestochova.

| Race/Skin color | Percentage | Number |
| White | 87.78% | 7115 |
| Pardo (brown) | 10.57% | 858 |
| Afro-Brazilian | 1.69% | 137 |
| Asian | 0.05% | 4 |

| Religion | Percentage | Number |
| Roman Catholics | 85.85% | 6,967 |
| Protestants | 12.53% | 1017 |
| No religion | 1.50% | 122 |
| Spiritists | 0.07% | 6 |
| Unknown | 0.04% | 3 |

== See also ==
- List of municipalities in Rio Grande do Sul
