= Frederico Westphalen =

Municipality of Rio Grande do Sul, Brazil

Frederico Westphalen, Rio Grande do Sul
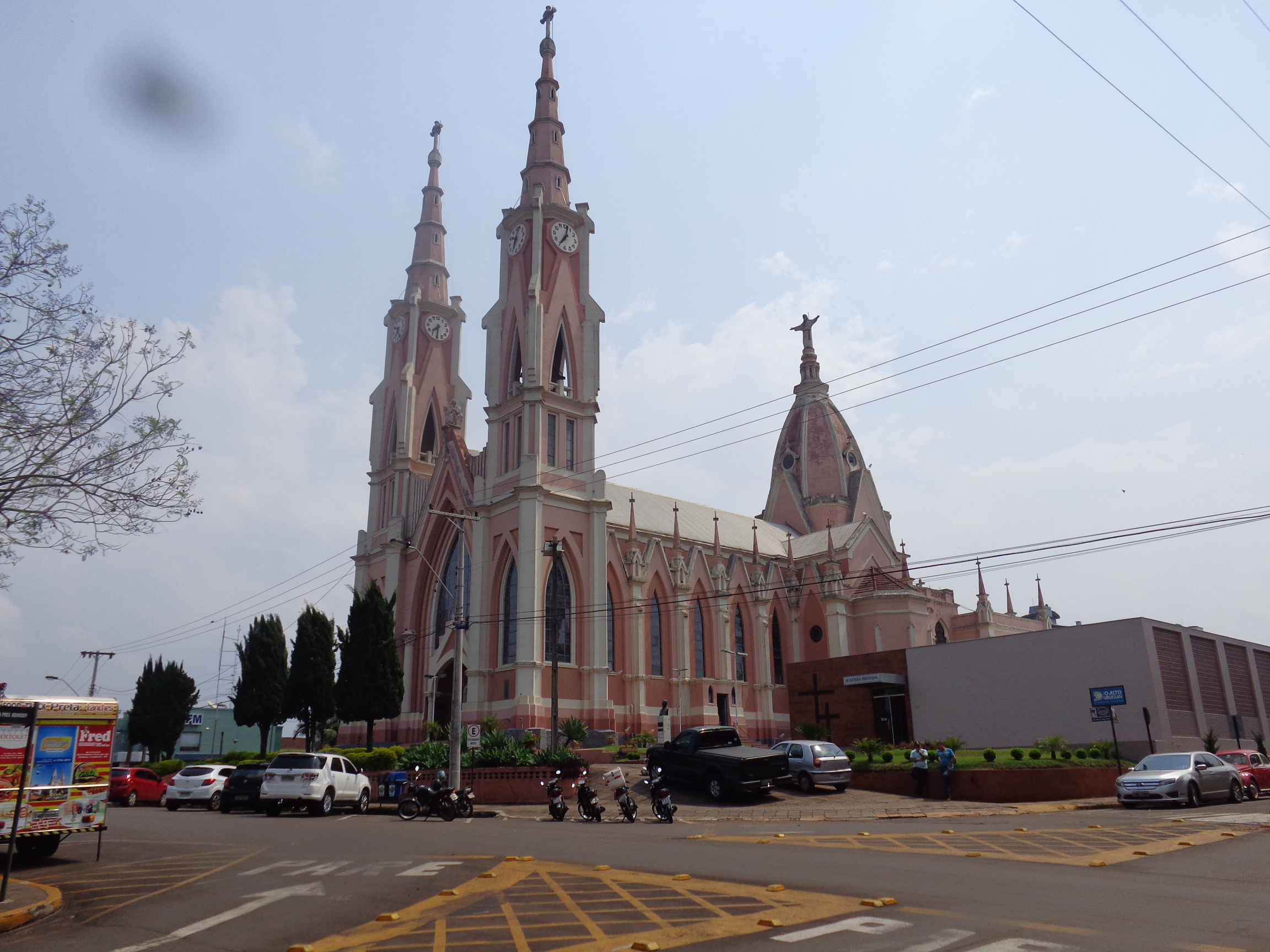
- Mother Church of Frederico Westphalen

- Flag Coat of arms

- Location within Brazil
- Coordinates: 27°22′00″S 53°24′00″W
- Country: Brazil
- Region: South
- State: Rio Grande do Sul
- Founded: December 6, 1956

Area
  - Total: 264.5 km^{2} (102.1 sq mi)
- Elevation: 522 m (1,713 ft)

Population (2020)
  - Total: 31,498
- Time zone: UTC−3 (BRT)

Frederico Westphalen is a southern Brazilian town located in the state of Rio Grande do Sul.

== History ==
The first migrants arrived in 1918, when the first trails were opened, before the definitive road, which took 10 years to be built, between Boca da Picada (current municipality of Seberi) and Águas do Mel (current city of Iraí).

The first carters, under the command of a merchant who had settled in Boca da Picada, transported manufactured goods and agricultural produce. On one of these trips, a barrel of brandy fell from the cart, damaging the lid. In order not to throw the container away, they had the idea of placing it upside down over a spring, under a shaded area, inserting a bamboo stick in the side hole. The location of the barrel by the roadside, with clean water and plenty of shade, contributed to the emergence of the expression “I will rest, eat and sleep in the barrel”. Thus the village grew in the jungle of the Alto Uruguai Valley, and began to be called simply “Barril”, a name that remained for years - and still remains as a municipal symbol.

Later, by Decree 30 of the Mayor of Palmeira das Missões, by decision of a residents' assembly, the name Vila Frederico Westphalen was established, honoring the engineer who colonized the region under the command of the State Government. Frederico Westphalen is buried in the Santa Casa de Misericórdia Cemetery in Porto Alegre.

== Economy ==
The economy of the region is based on the food processing industries, furniture industries and agriculture. Despite this, the economy of the city of Frederico Westphalen has been diversified greatly in the past twenty years, becoming largely commerce and service based.

== Geography ==
=== Neighbor cities ===
Frederico Westphalen has frontiers with the towns of Iraí, Vicente Dutra, Caiçara, Vista Alegre, Taquaruçu do Sul, Seberi, Cristal do Sul and Ametista do Sul.

=== Access ===
Two roads give access to the town: BR-386 and RS-150

=== Climate ===
The climate is Sub-tropical with two well defined seasons: Summer (October to April) and Winter (May to September).

== Media ==
The town has two local newspapers, one called O Alto Uruguai and other called Folha do Noroeste, and two radio stations, Rádio Luz e Alegria and Rádio Comunitária.

== Universities and colleges ==
Frederico Westphalen has one university: URI - Universidade Regional Integrada do Alto Uruguay e Missões - University Website, and an extension of the UFSM, Universidade Federal de Santa Maria, the CESNORS (Centro de Educação Superior Norte do Rio Grande do Sul).

== Schools ==
There are six schools on the town: Colégio Agrícola (technical school), Colégio Nossa Sra. Auxiliadora, Colégio Estadual José Cannelas, Escola de Educação Básica Sepé Tiaraju, Escola Afonso Pena and Escola Cardeal Roncalli.

== See also ==
- German-Brazilian
- Riograndenser Hunsrückisch
- List of municipalities in Rio Grande do Sul
