= Ametista do Sul =

Municipality of Rio Grande do Sul, Brazil

- Municipality
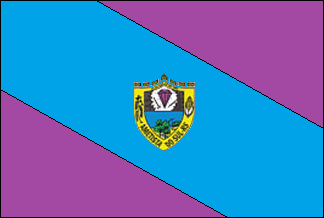
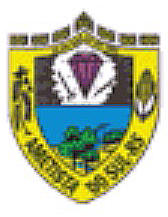
- Flag Coat of arms
- Nickname: O município que Brilha
- Coordinates: 27°21′39″S 53°10′55″W
- Country: Brazil
- State: Rio Grande do Sul
- Mesoregion: Noroeste Rio-grandense
- Microregion: Frederico Westphalen
- Founded: March 20, 1992

Government
  - Mayor: Jadir José Kovaleski (PP)

Area
  - Total: 93,704 km^{2} (36,179 sq mi)
- Elevation: 505 m (1,657 ft)

Population (2022)
  - Total: 7,650
  - Density: 0.0816/km^{2} (0.211/sq mi)
- Time zone: UTC−3 (BRT)
- HDI: 0.754
- GDP: R$ 41,493,000
- GDP per capita: R$ 5,161.00
- Website: https://ametistadosul.rs.gov.br/

Ametista do Sul (Portuguese: [a.meˈt͡ʃis.tɐ du ˈsuw], lit. 'southern amethyst') is a municipality in the state of Rio Grande do Sul, Brazil. It borders Planalto, Frederico Westphalen, Cristal do Sul, Rodeio Bonito and Iraí. The municipality is known for the amethyst mines in the area. The center of town has a pyramid that the interior base walls (3 meters) are lined with amethyst. The opposing Catholic Church interior walls (6 meters) are covered with amethyst.

The community has several amethyst mines active. There is a museum dedicated to the industry. There are vineyards with older unproductive mines converted to wine cellars. There are stores and other outlets to purchase amethyst and other stones.

== See also ==
- List of municipalities in Rio Grande do Sul
