= South Region, Brazil =

South Region Região Sul
- Region
- Coordinates: 25°26′S 49°16′W
- Country: Brazil
- Largest city: Curitiba
- States: Paraná, Rio Grande do Sul, Santa Catarina

Area
  - Region: 576,409.6 km^{2} (222,553.0 sq mi)
  - Rank: 5th

Population (2022)
  - Region: 29,937,706
  - Rank: 3rd
  - Density: 51.93825/km^{2} (134.5195/sq mi)
  - Rank: 2nd
  - Urban: 82%

GDP
  - Total: R$ 1.560 trillion (US$ 289.348 billion)

HDI
  - Year: 2017
  - Category: 0.798 – high (1st)
  - Life expectancy: 77.2 years (1st)
  - Infant mortality: 7.7 per 1,000 (5th)
  - Literacy: 98.3% (1st)
- Time zone: UTC−03:00 (BRT)

The South Region of Brazil (Região Sul do Brasil [ʁeʒiˈɐ̃w ˈsuw du bɾaˈziw]) is one of the five regions of Brazil. It includes the states of Paraná, Rio Grande do Sul, and Santa Catarina, and covers 576,409.6 square kilometres (222,553.0 sq mi), being the smallest region of the country, occupying only about 6.76% of the territory of Brazil. Its whole area is smaller than that of the state of Minas Gerais in Southeast Brazil or the whole of metropolitan France.

It is a tourist, economic and cultural pole. It borders Uruguay, Argentina, and Paraguay, as well as the Centre-West and Southeast regions, and the Atlantic Ocean. The region is considered the safest in Brazil to visit, having a lower crime rate than other regions in the country.

== History ==
=== Pre-Columbian history ===
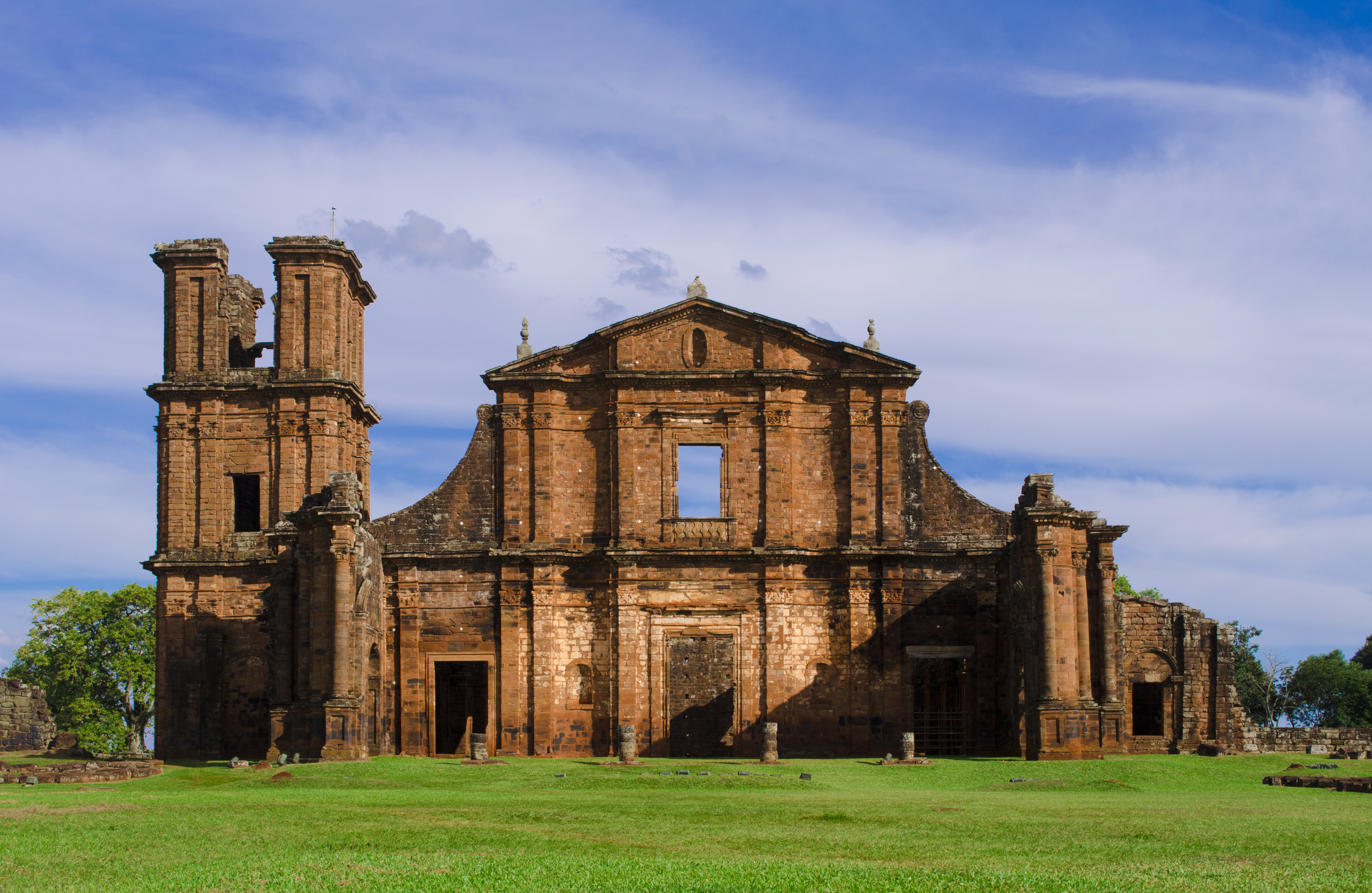
São Miguel das Missões, where Jesuits lived with local Indigenous.

By the time the first European explorers arrived, all parts of the territory were inhabited by semi-nomadic hunter-gatherer native tribes. They subsisted on a combination of hunting, fishing, and gathering.

=== Portuguese colonization ===
European colonization in Southern Brazil started with the arrival of Portuguese and Spanish Jesuit missionaries. They lived among the Natives and converted them to Catholicism. Colonists from São Paulo (Bandeirantes) arrived in the same period. For decades, the Portuguese and Spanish crowns disputed over this region.

Due to this conflict, the King of Portugal encouraged the immigration of settlers from the Azores Islands to Southern Brazil, in an attempt to build up a Portuguese population. Between 1748 and 1756, six thousand Azoreans arrived. They composed over half of the population of Rio Grande do Sul and Santa Catarina by the late 18th century.

=== German settlement ===
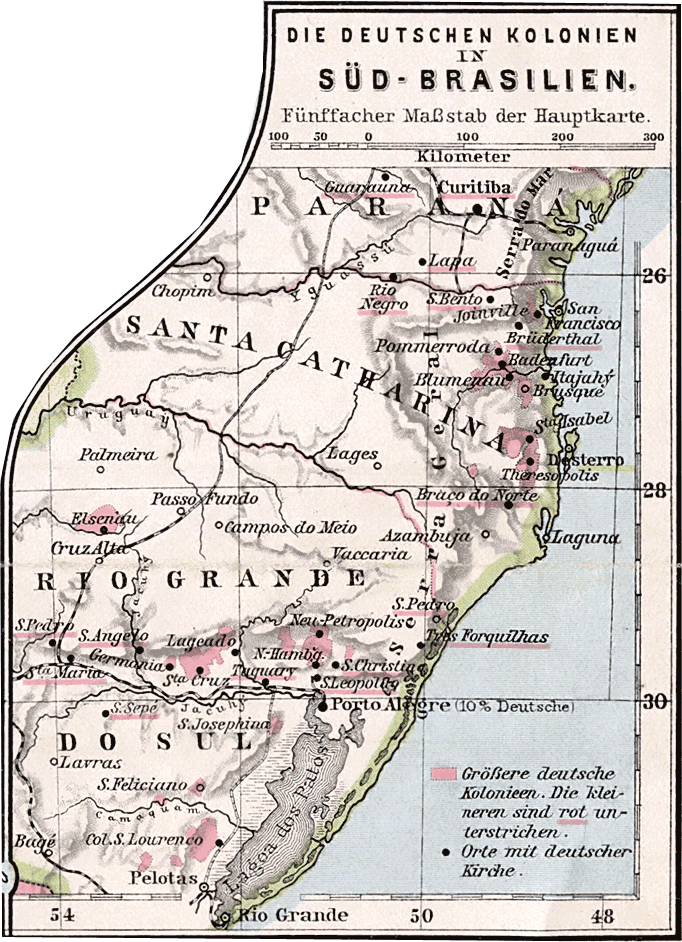
Areas of German settlement in Southern Brazil (pink), in 1905

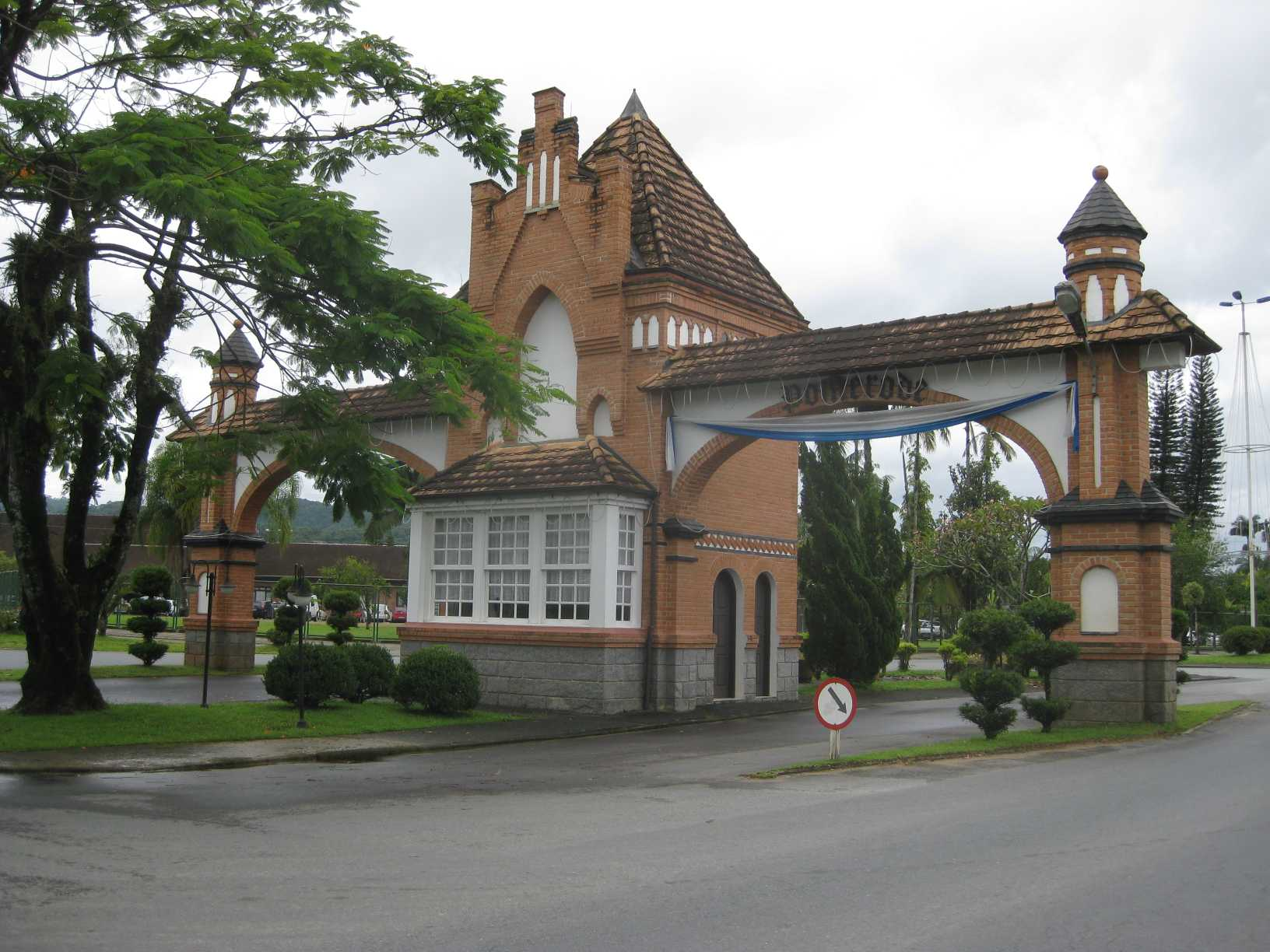
Pomerode, A Pomeranian-German colony in Santa Catarina

The first German immigrants came to Brazil soon after it gained independence in 1822 from Portugal. They were recruited to work as small farmers because there were many land holdings without sufficient workers. To attract the immigrants, the Brazilian government had promised them large tracts where they could settle with their families and colonize the region. The first immigrants arrived in 1824, settling in the city of São Leopoldo. Over the next four decades, another 27,256 Germans were brought to Rio Grande do Sul to work as smallholders in the country. By 1904, it is estimated that 50,000 Germans had settled in this state.

In Santa Catarina, most German immigrants were not brought by the Brazilian government but by private groups that promoted the immigration of Europeans to the Americas, such as the Hamburg Colonization Society. These groups created rural communities or colonies for immigrants, many of which developed into large cities, such as Blumenau and Joinville, the largest city in Santa Catarina.

Considerable numbers of immigrants from Germany arrived at Paraná during the civil war, most of them coming from Santa Catarina; others were Volga Germans from Russia.

=== Ragamuffin War ===
The Ragamuffin War was a Republican uprising that began in Southern Brazil (Rio Grande do Sul and Santa Catarina) in 1835. The rebels, led by generals Bento Gonçalves da Silva and Antônio de Souza Netto with the support of the Italian warrior Giuseppe Garibaldi, surrendered to imperial forces in 1845. This conflict occurred because in Rio Grande do Sul, the state's main product, the charque (dried and salted beef), suffered stiff competition from charque from Uruguay and Argentina. The imports had free access to the Brazilian market while gaúchos had to pay high taxes to sell their product inside Brazil. The Italian revolutionary Giuseppe Garibaldi joined the rebels in 1839. With his help the revolution spread through Santa Catarina, in the northern border of Rio Grande do Sul. After many conflicts, in 1845 peace negotiations ended the war.

=== Italian settlement ===
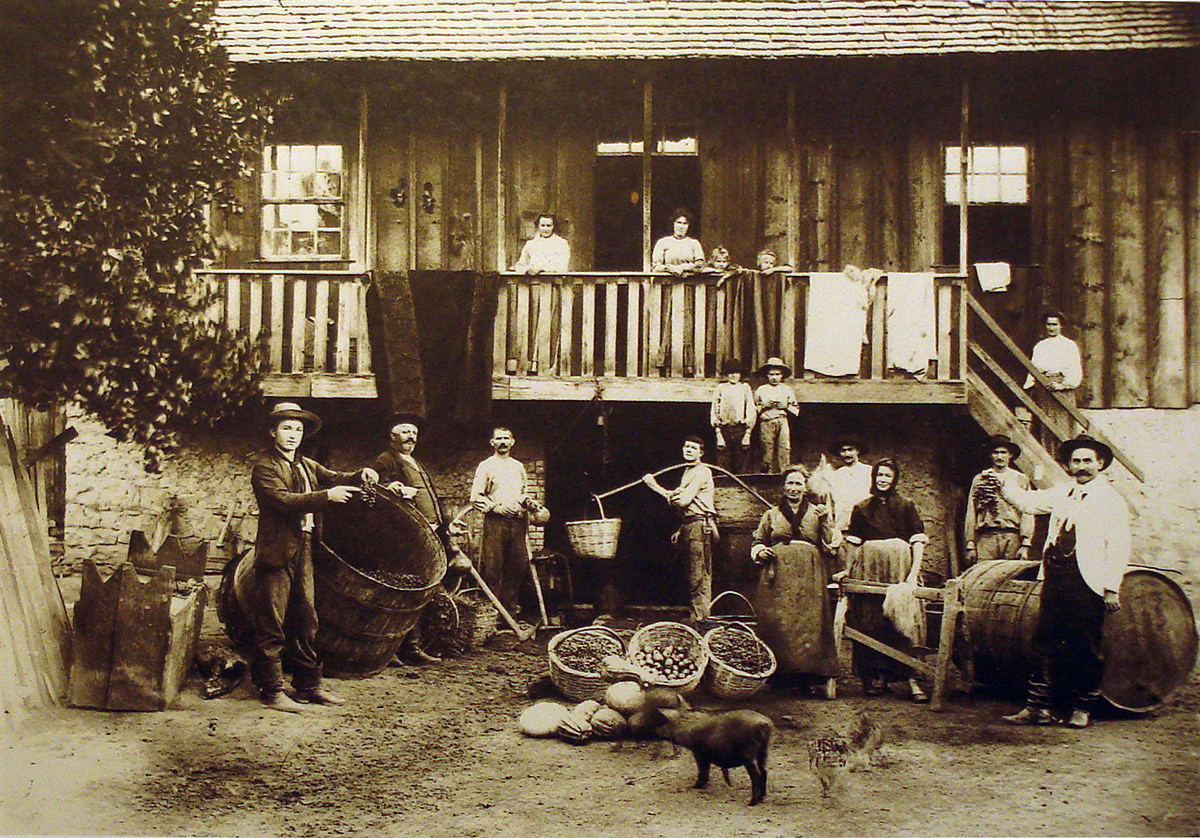
Italian immigrants in Caxias do Sul, Rio Grande do Sul in 1904.

Italian immigrants started arriving in Brazil in 1875. They were mostly peasants from the Veneto in Northern Italy (but also from Trentino and Lombardia) attracted to Southern Brazil for economic opportunities and the chance to acquire their own lands. Most of the immigrants worked as small farmers, mainly cultivating grapes in the Serra Gaúcha. Italian immigration to the region lasted until 1914, with a total of 100,000 Italians settling in Rio Grande do Sul in this period, and many others in Santa Catarina and Paraná.

In 1898, there were a total of 300,000 people of Italian origin in Rio Grande do Sul; 50,000 in Santa Catarina; and 30,000 in Paraná. Today their Southern Brazilian descendants (Italian South Brazilians) number 9.7 million and comprise 35.9% of Southern Brazil's population.

Polish settlement

== Demographics ==
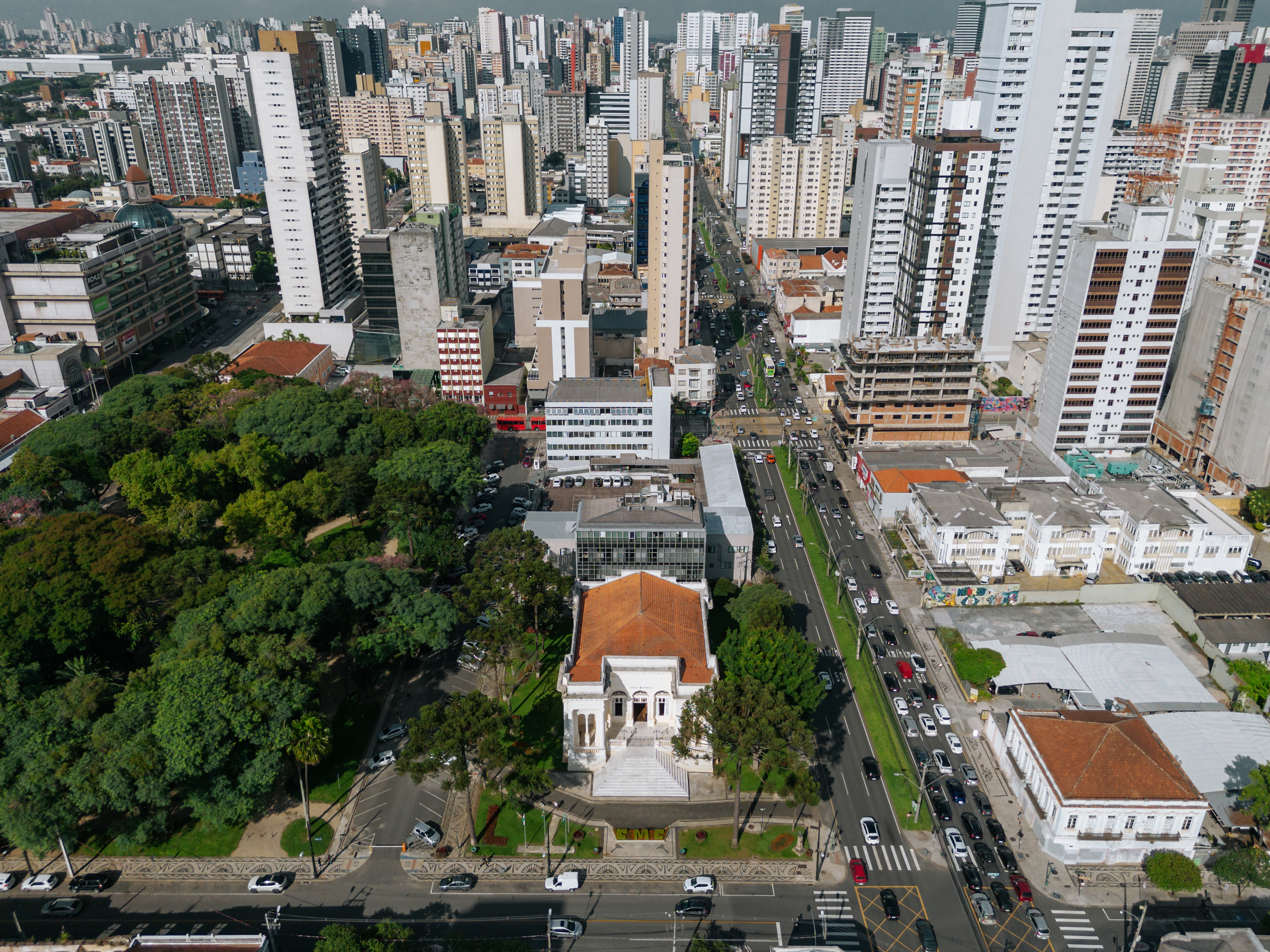
Curitiba

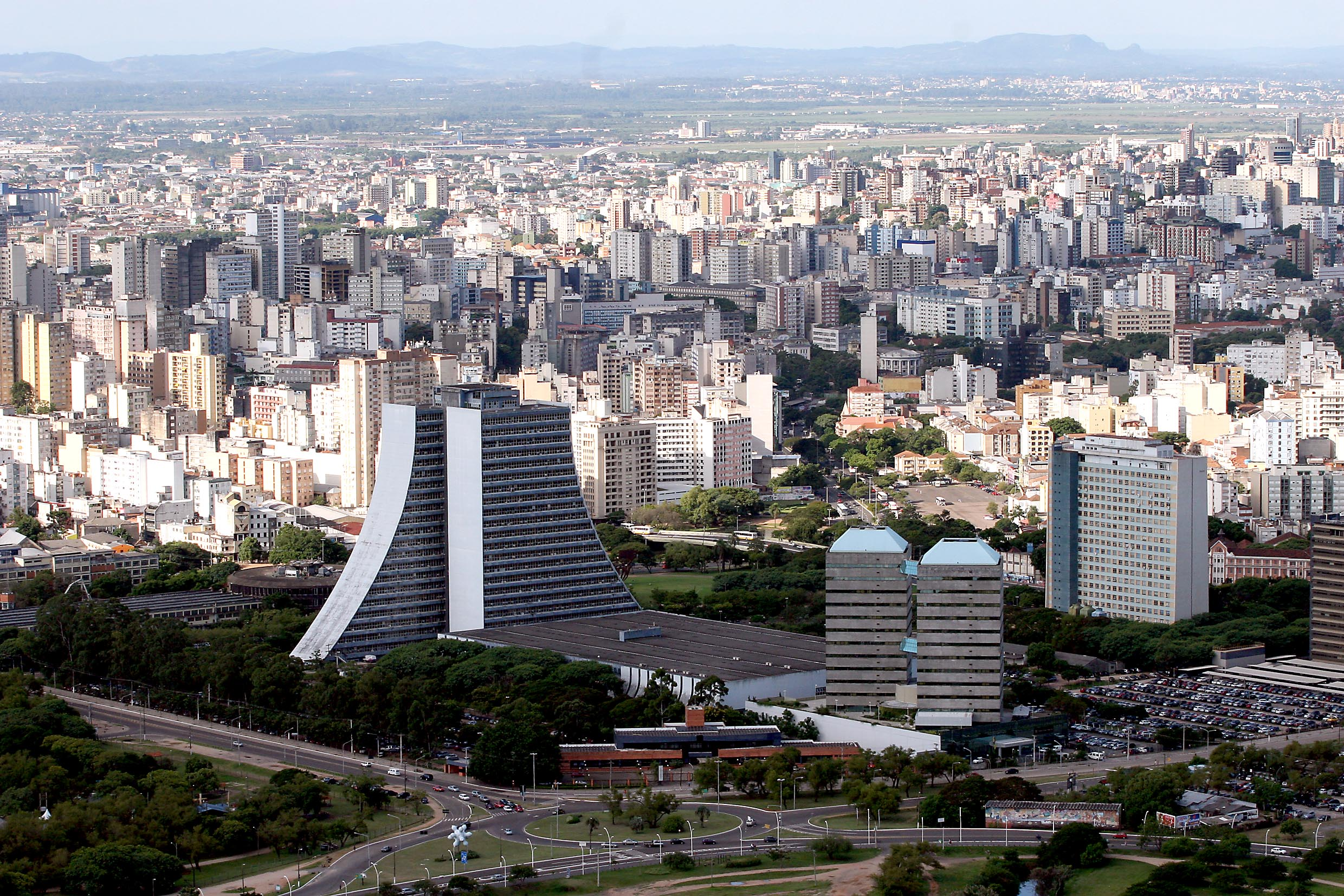
Porto Alegre

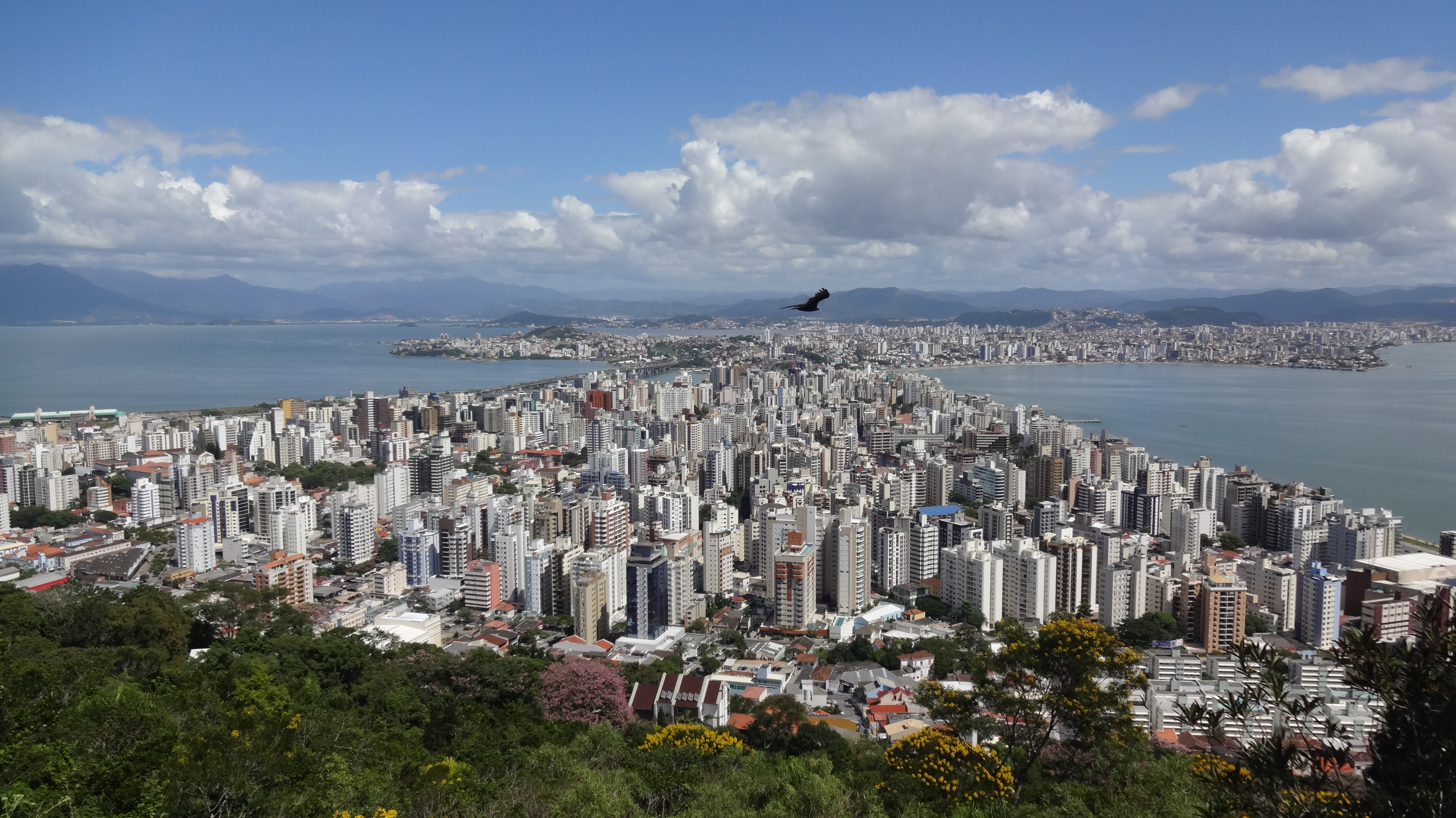
Florianópolis

As noted, the region received numerous European immigrants during the 19th century, who have had a large influence on its demography and culture. The main ethnic origins of Southern Brazil are Portuguese, Italian, German, Austrian, Luxembourger, Polish, Ukrainian, Spanish, Dutch and Russian. Smaller numbers that follow are French, Norwegian, Swedish, Danish, African, Swiss, Croat, Lebanese, Lithuanian and Latvian, Japanese, Finnish and Estonian, Belarusian, Slovene, Ashkenazi Jew, Caboclo, British, Czech, Slovak, Belgian and Hungarian

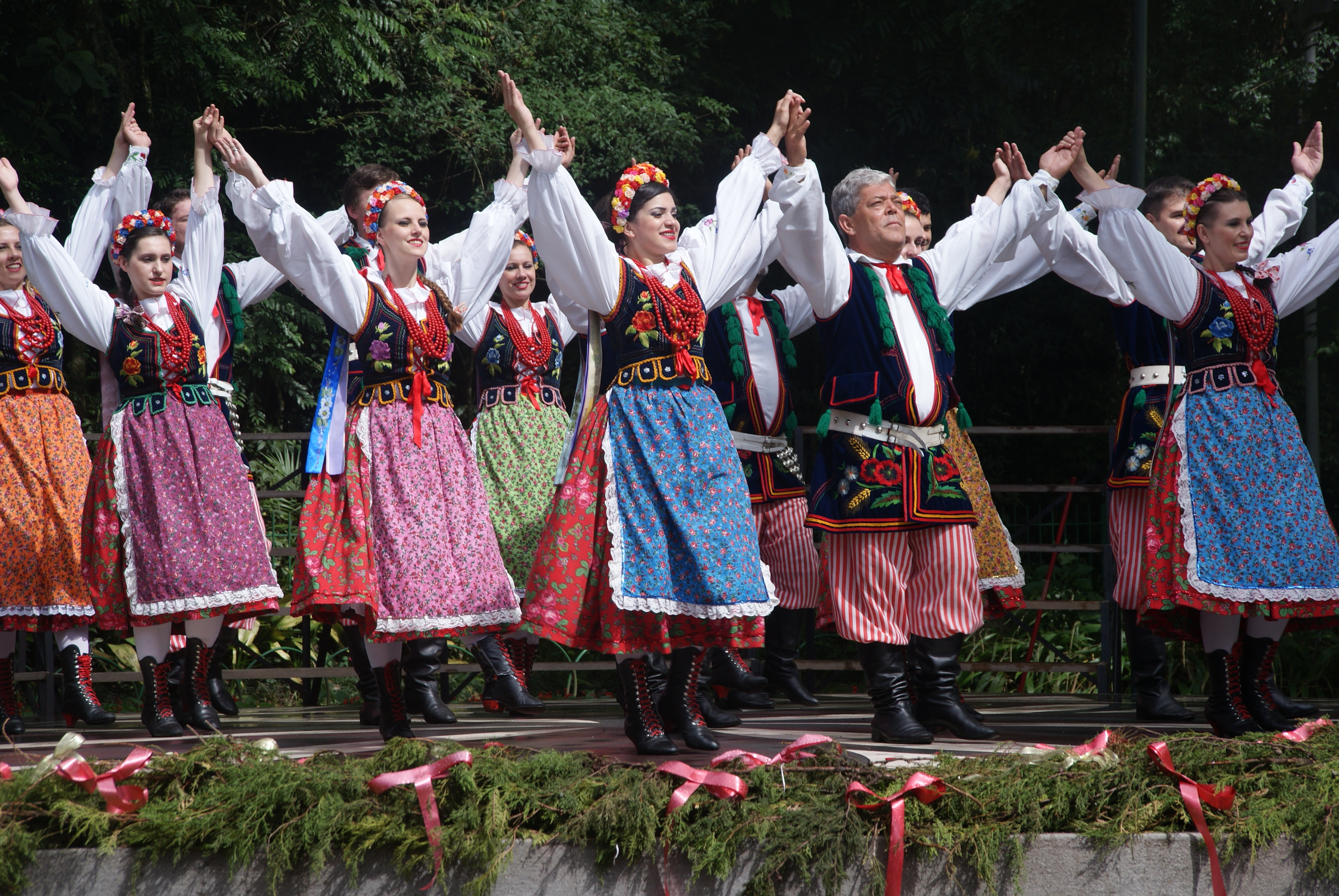
Polish descendants at a Christmas festival in Curitiba.

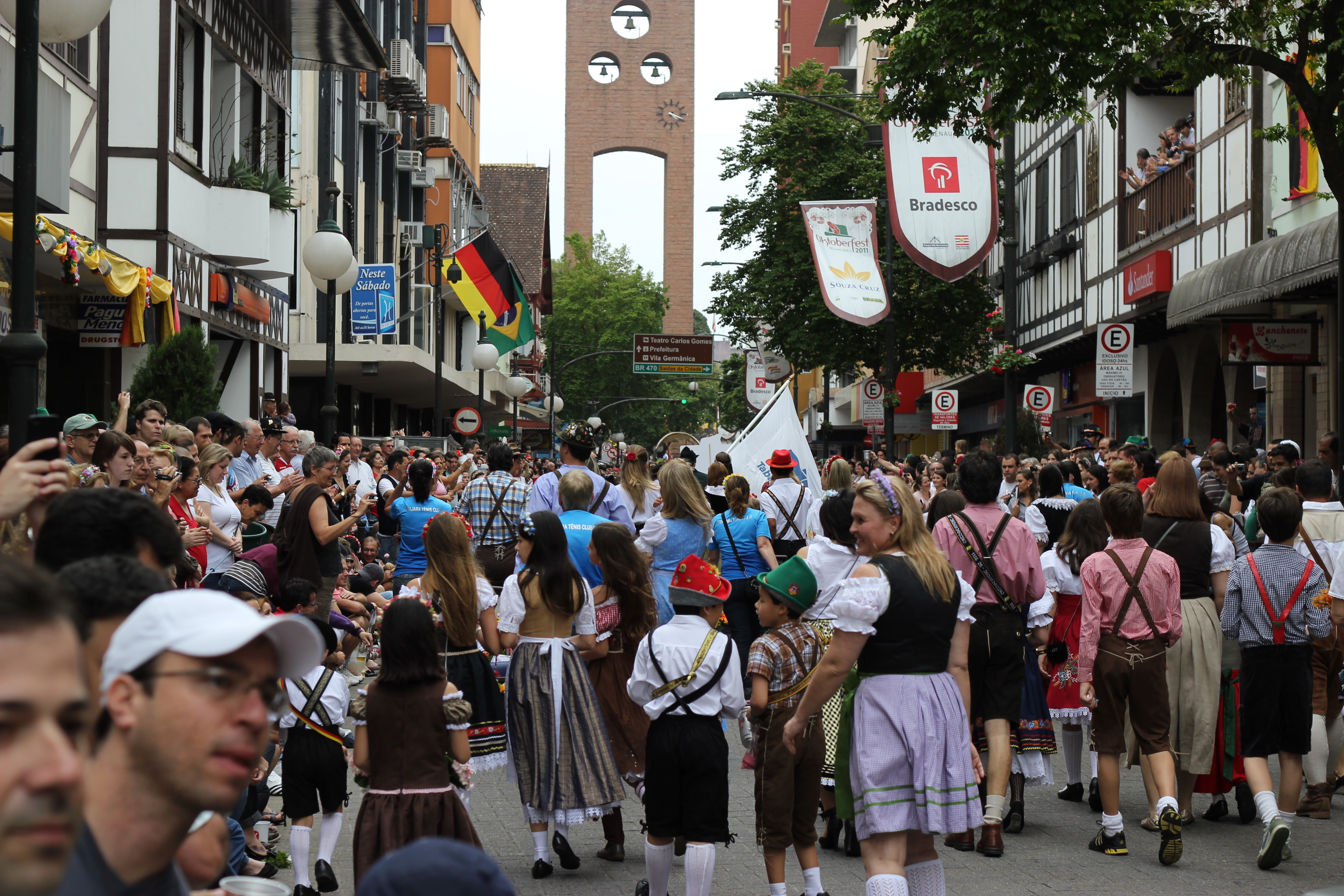
Brazilians at the Oktoberfest of Blumenau.

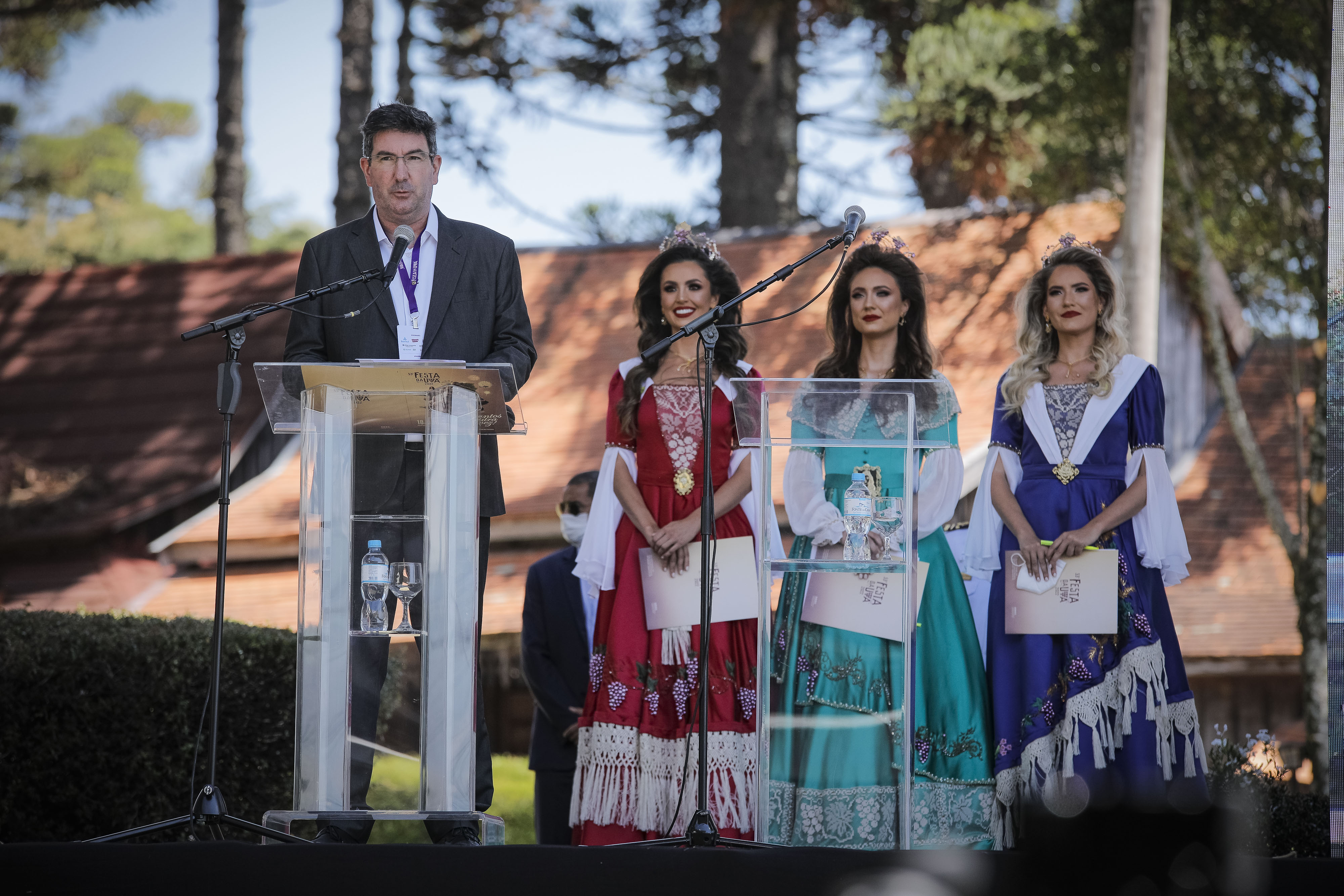
Opening of the 2022 Grape festival in Caxias do Sul.

City	State	Population (2022)
Curitiba	Paraná	1,773,718
Porto Alegre	Rio Grande do Sul	1,332,845
Joinville	Santa Catarina	616,317
Londrina	Paraná	555,965
Florianópolis	Santa Catarina	537,211
Caxias do Sul	Rio Grande do Sul	463,501
Maringá	Paraná	409,657
Blumenau	Santa Catarina	361,261
Ponta Grossa	Paraná	358,371
Canoas	Rio Grande do Sul	347,657
Pelotas	Rio Grande do Sul	325,689

=== Racial composition ===
Racial groups in Brazil (2022 census)
1. Whites (72.6%)
2. Pardos (Mixed) (21.7%)
3. Blacks (5.00%)
4. East Asians (0.40%)
5. Indigenous (0.30%)

Percentage of the population by racial group (2022 census)
State	Whites	Pardos	Blacks	East Asians	Indigenous
Rio Grande do Sul	78.42%	14.67%	6.52%	0.07%	0.31%
Santa Catarina	76.28%	19.22%	4.07%	0.16%	0.25%
Paraná	64.57%	30.06%	4.24%	0.88%	0.24%

== Geography ==
=== Climate ===
Climate types of Southern Brazil.

Southern Brazil has a temperate climate, with its area composed of humid subtropical (Cfa) and temperate oceanic (Cfb) Köppen climates. The annual average temperatures vary between 12 °C (53.6 °F) and 22 °C (71.6 °F). It snows in the mountain ranges.

== Characteristics ==
The region is highly urbanized (82%) and many cities are famous for their urban planning, like Curitiba and Maringá, both in Paraná State. It has a relatively high standard of living, with the highest Human Development Index of Brazil, 0.859 (2007), and the second highest per capita income of the country, $13,396, behind only the Southeast Region. The region also has a 98.3% literacy rate.

== Languages ==
Portuguese, the official language of Brazil, is spoken by the entire population. In the south countryside, dialects of German or Italian origins are also spoken. The predominant dialects are Hunsrückisch and Venetian (or Talian). In Rio Grande do Sul and Curitiba there are some Yiddish speakers. In the northern region of Paraná there are some Japanese speakers. In the region around Ponta Grossa there are also some Dutch speakers. There are Polish language and Ukrainian language speakers in Paraná as well. Indigenous languages still spoken in some villages include Guarani and Kaingang.

== Economy ==
=== Agriculture ===
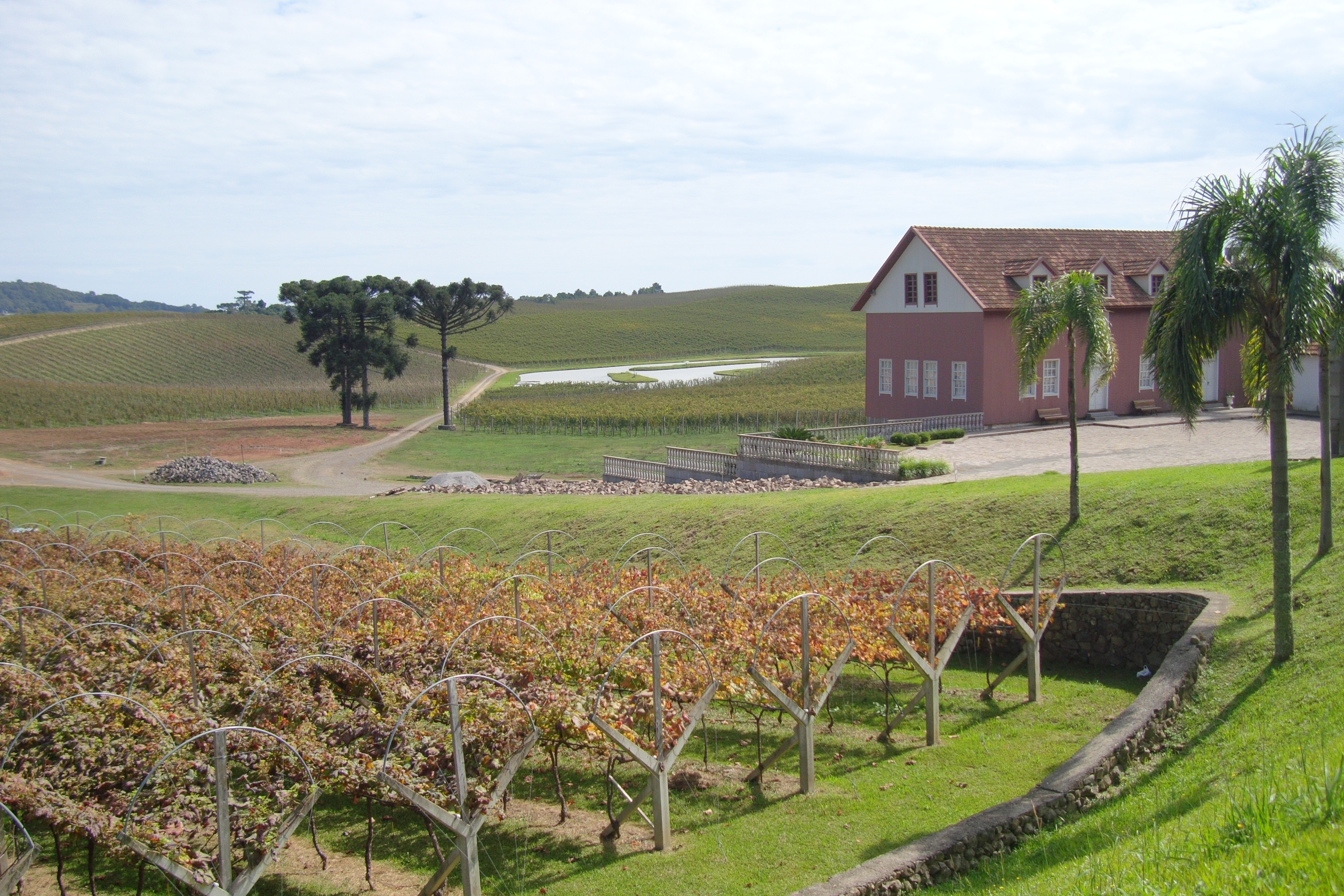
Vineyards in Rio Grande do Sul.

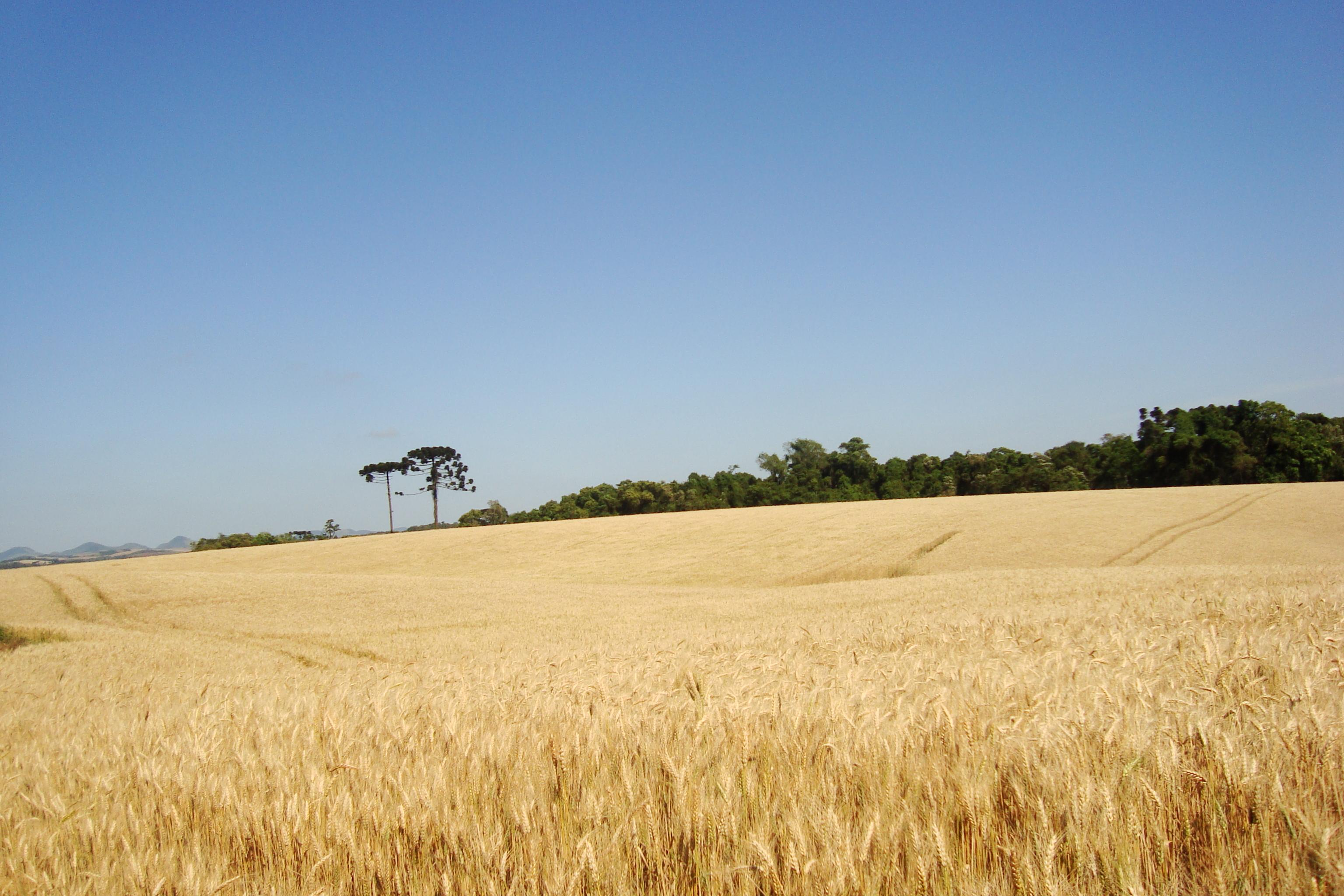
Wheat in Paraná.

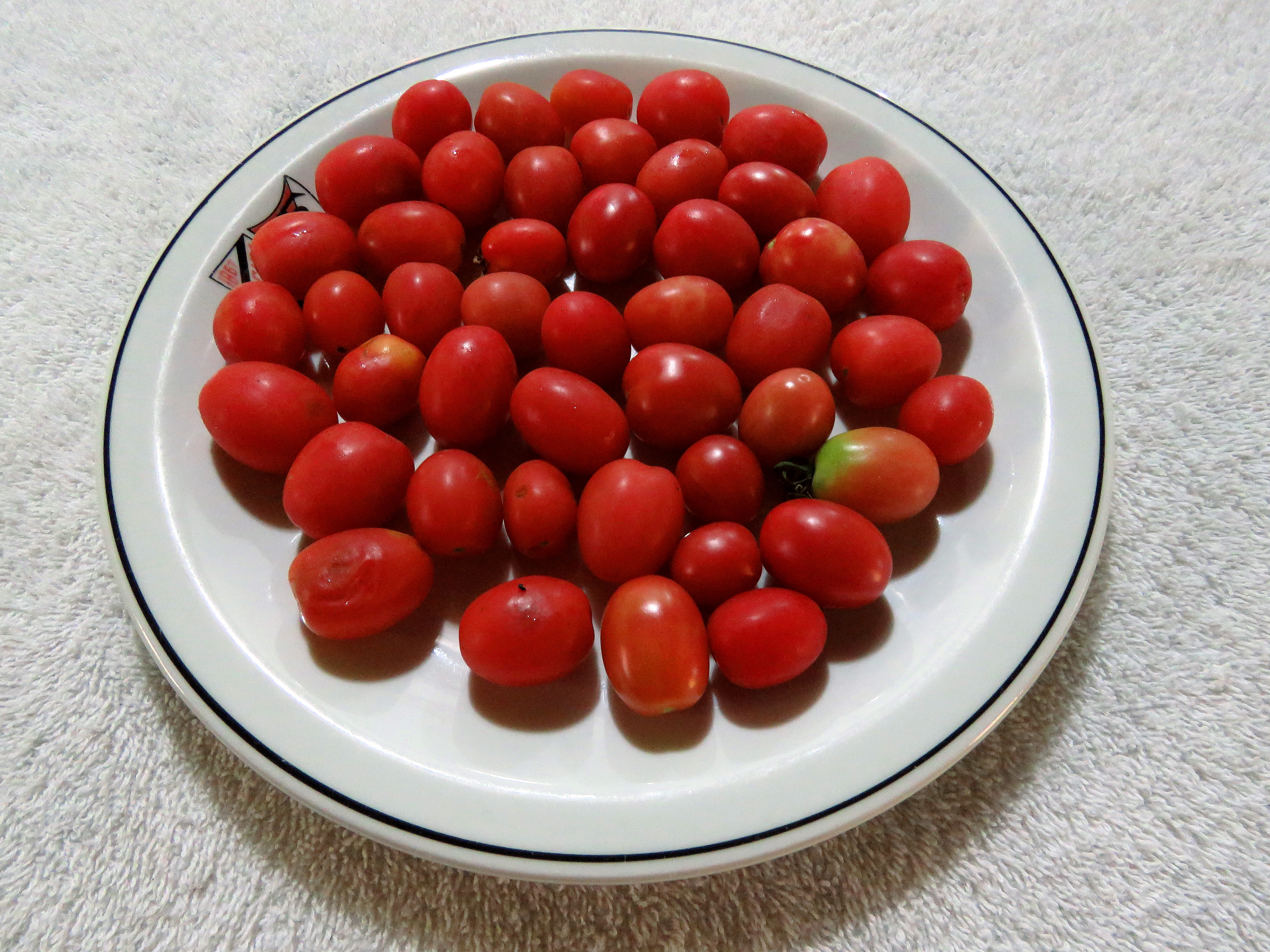
Tomatoes production in Rio Grande do Sul.

The main agricultural products grown are:

- soy (35% of the country's production, which is the world's largest producer);
- maize (35% of the country's production, which is the 3rd world producer);
- tobacco (almost all the production of the country, which is the second largest producer in the world and the largest exporter);
- rice (80% of the country's production, which is the ninth largest producer in the world);
- grape (almost all the production of the country, which is the eleventh largest producer in the world);
- apple (almost all the production of the country, which is the thirteenth world producer);
- wheat (almost all the country's production);
- oat (almost all the country's production);
- sugar cane (8% of the country's production, which is the world's largest producer);
- cassava (25% of the country's production, which is the fifth largest producer in the world);
- yerba mate (almost all the production of the country, which is one of the largest producers in the world);
- bean (26% of the country's production, which is the third largest producer in the world);

in addition to producing relevant quantities of:

- orange (6% of the country's production, which is the world's largest producer);
- tangerine (30% of the country's production, which is the sixth largest producer in the world);
- persimmon (20% of the country's production, which is the sixth largest producer in the world);
- barley, peach, fig and onion (most of the country's production);
- strawberry.

=== Livestock ===
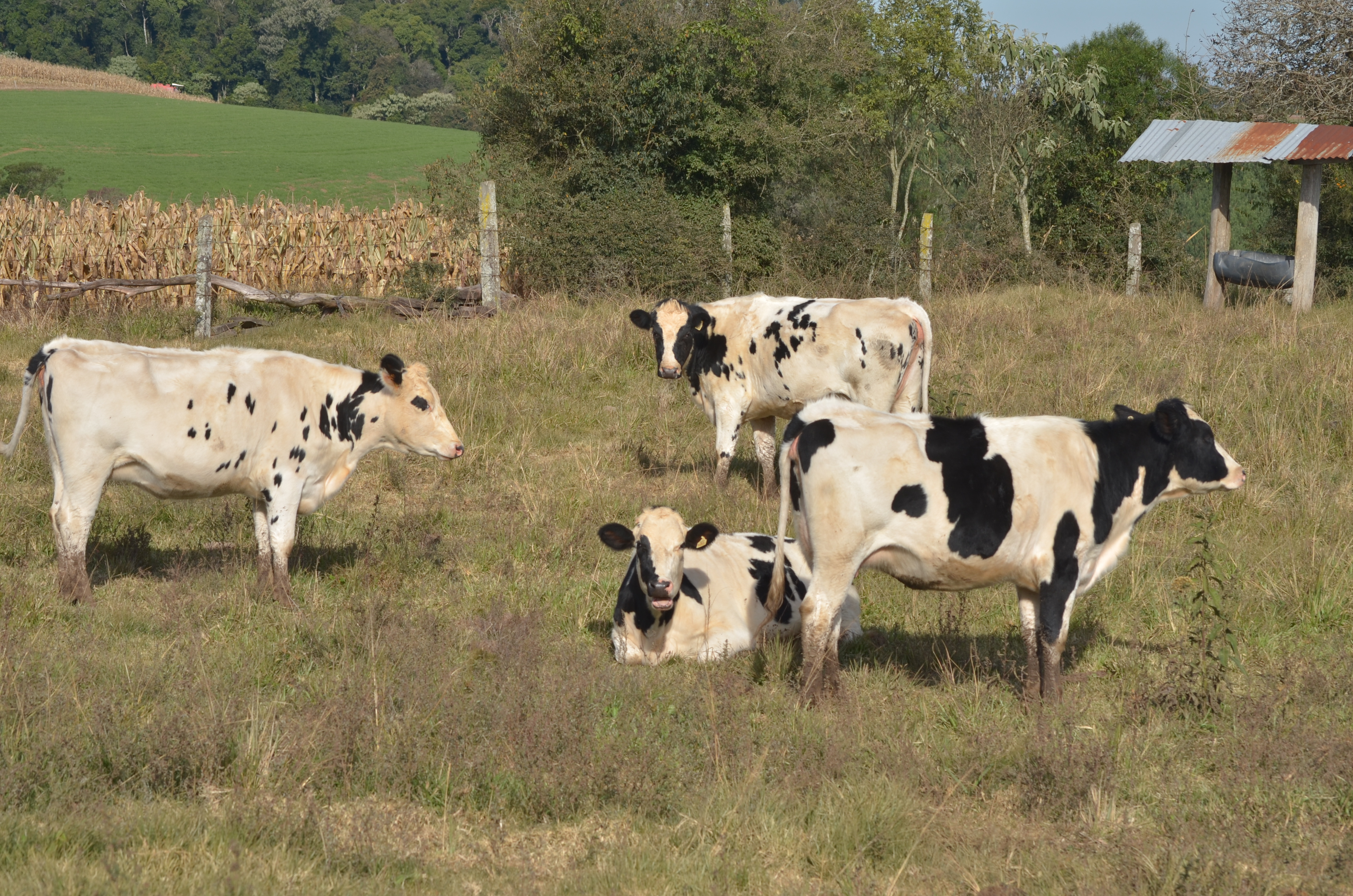
Cattle in Rio Grande do Sul.

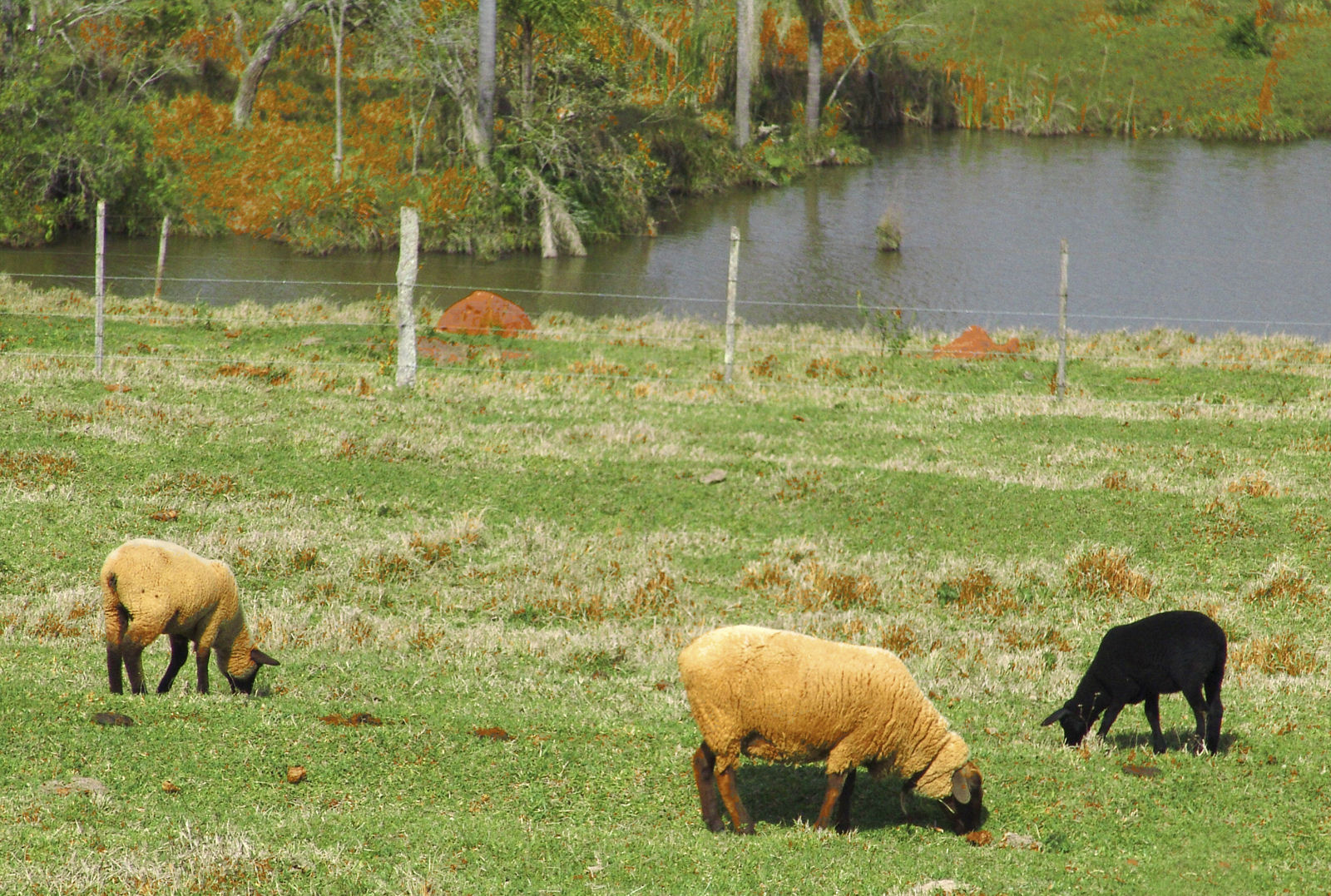
Sheep in Rio Grande do Sul.

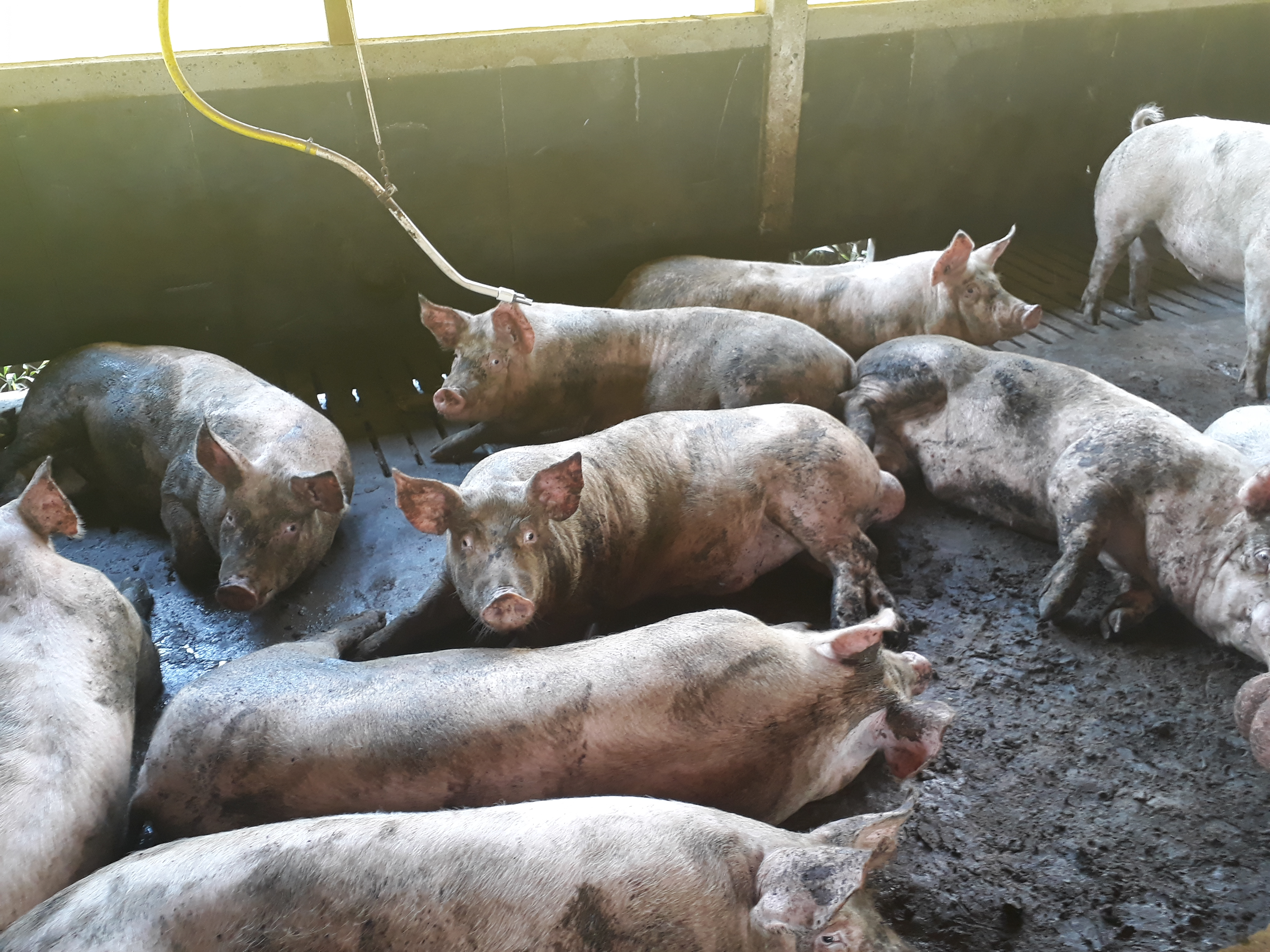
Swine in Santa Catarina

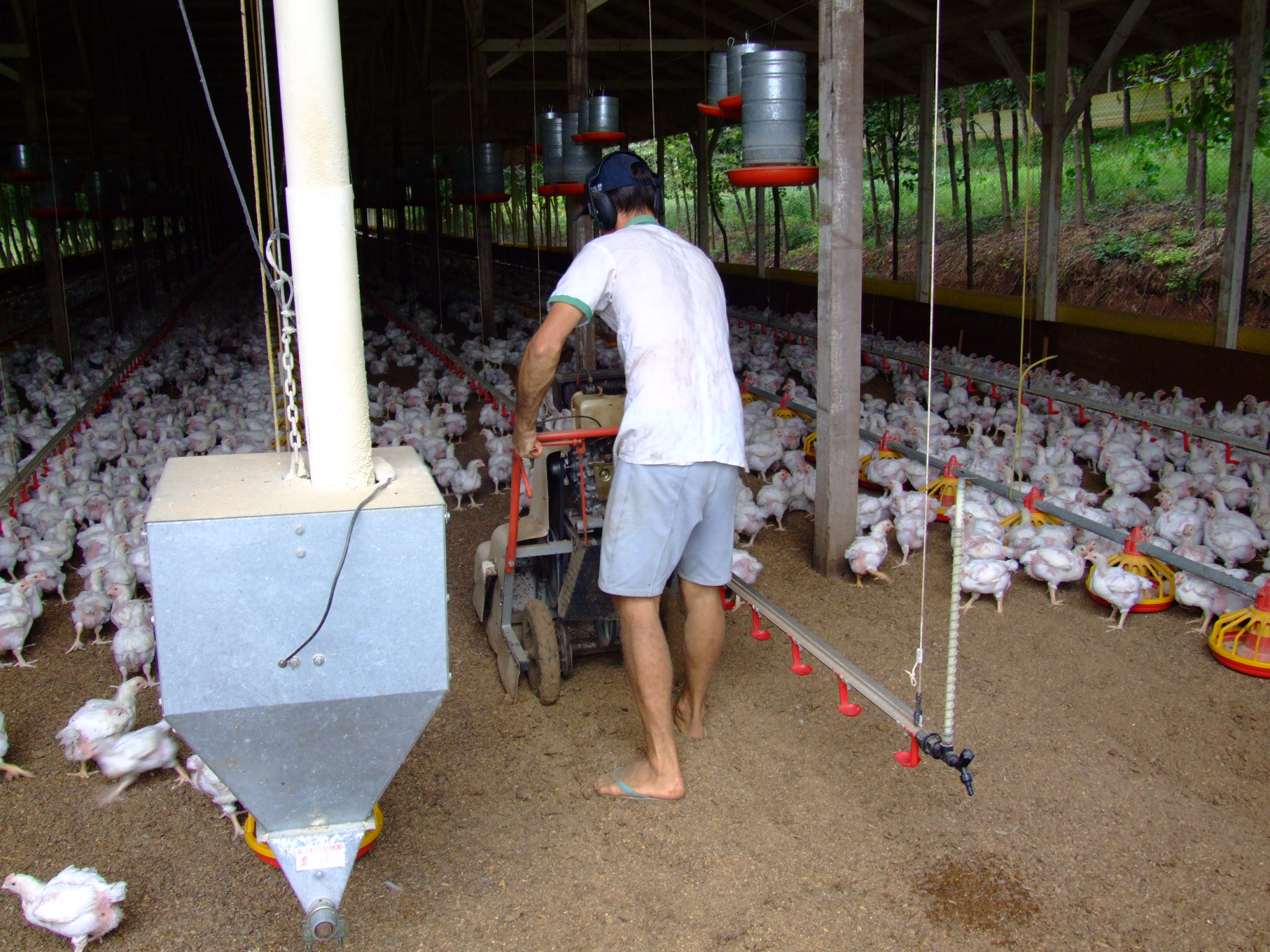
Poultry in Santa Catarina

In 2017, the southern region gathered around 12% of Brazil's cattle (27 million head of cattle).

In sheep farming, in 2017, the South Region was the second largest in the country, with 4.2 million head. Sheep shearing activity continued to be predominant in the South, which is responsible for 99% of wool production in the country. Rio Grande do Sul continued to be the state with the highest national participation, representing 94.1% of the total. The municipalities of Santana do Livramento, Alegrete and Quaraí led the activity. Currently, meat production has become the main objective of sheep farming in the State, due to the increase in prices paid to the producer that made the activity more attractive and profitable.

Intensive livestock farming is also highly developed in the South, which ranks first in the ranking of Brazilian milk production. Some of the milk produced in the South benefits from the dairy industries. The South has 35.7% of the Brazilian milk production, competing with the Southeast (which was the largest producer until 2014), which has 34.2%. The southeast has the largest herd of cows milked: 30.4% of the total of 17.1 million existing in Brazil. The highest productivity, however, is that of the Southern Region, with an average of 3,284 liters per cow per year, which is why it has led the ranking of milk production since 2015. The municipality of Castro, in Paraná, was the largest producer in 2017, with 264 million liters of milk. Paraná is already the second largest national producer with 4.7 billion liters, only surpassed by Minas Gerais.

In pork, the 3 southern states are the largest producers in the country. Santa Catarina is the largest producer in Brazil. The State is responsible for 28.38% of the country's slaughter and 40.28% of Brazilian pork exports. Paraná, for its part, has a breeding stock of 667 thousand inhabited dwellings, with a herd representing 17.85% of the Brazilian total. Paraná occupies the second position in the country's productive ranking, with 21.01%, and the third place among exporting states, with 14.22%. In third place in Brazil is Rio Grande do Sul, with almost 15% participation.

Poultry farming is strong in the South. In 2018, the South region, with an emphasis on the creation of chickens for slaughter, was responsible for almost half of the Brazilian total (46.9%). Paraná only represented 26.2%. Paraná occupies the Brazilian leadership in the ranking of chicken producing and exporting states. Rio Grande do Sul ranks third in national production, with 11%.

In egg production, the South Region is the 2nd largest in Brazil, with 24.1% of the country's production. Paraná ranks 2nd in the Brazilian ranking, with 9.6% of the national participation.

In fish farming, western Paraná, in municipalities close to Toledo and Cascavel, has become the largest fishing region in the country, with tilapia as the main cultivated species. The west represents 69% of all the production of Paraná, the largest national producer, with 112 thousand tons. Of this amount, 91% refers to tilapia farming.

The South region was the main producer of honey in the country in 2017, representing 39.7% of the national total. Rio Grande do Sul was the first with 15.2%, Paraná in second place with 14.3%, Santa Catarina in fifth place with 10.2%.

=== Mining ===
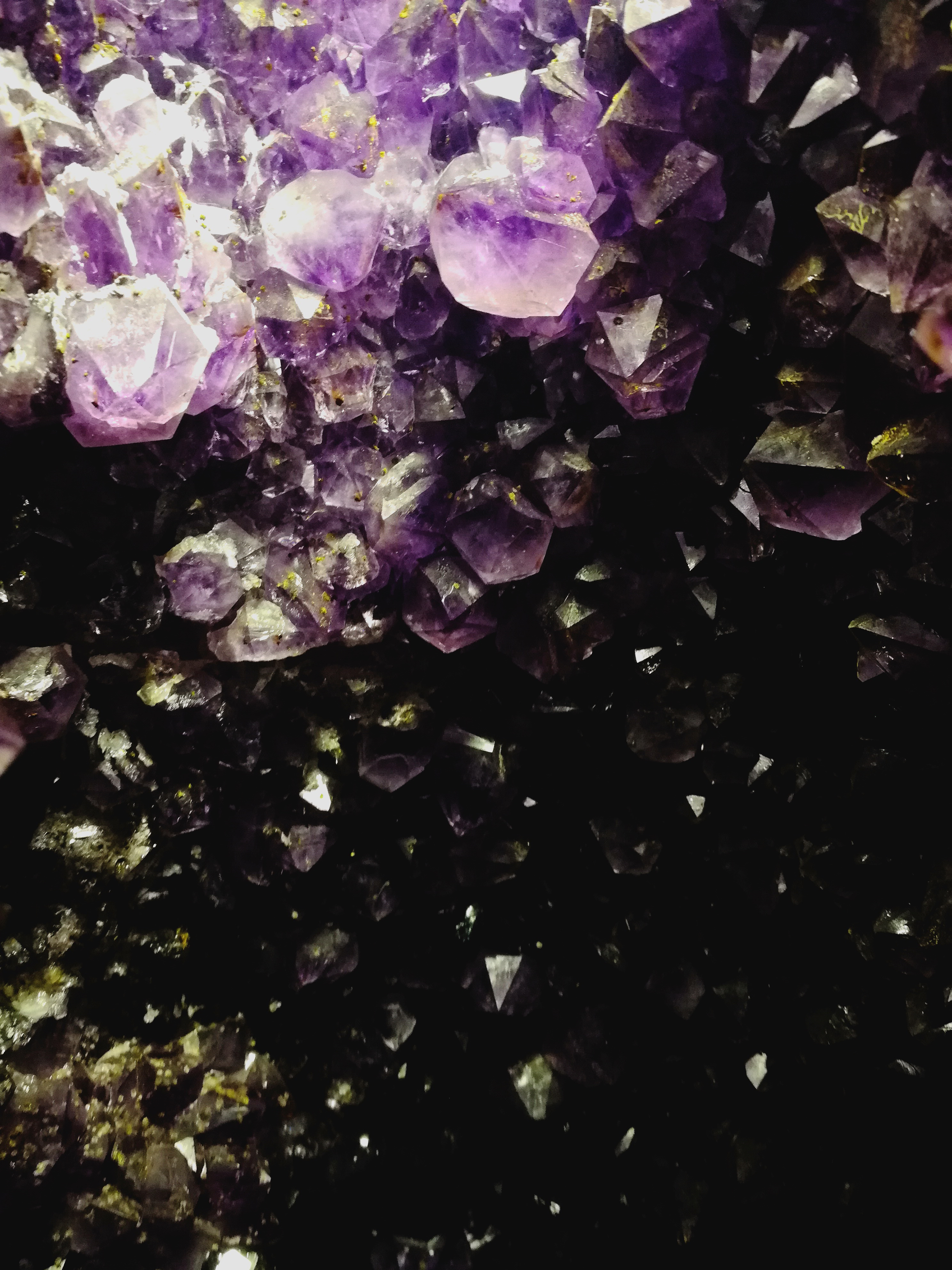
Amethyst mine in Ametista do Sul, in Rio Grande do Sul.

Santa Catarina is the largest producer of coal in Brazil, mainly in the city of Criciúma and its surroundings. Crude mineral coal production in Brazil was 13.6 million tons in 2007. Santa Catarina produced 8.7 Mt (million tons); Rio Grande do Sul, 4.5 Mt; and Paraná, 0.4 Mt. Despite the extraction of mineral coal in Brazil, the country still needs to import around 50% of the coal consumed, since the coal produced in the country is of low quality, since it has a lower concentration of carbon. Countries supplying mineral coal to Brazil include South Africa, the United States and Australia. Mineral coal in Brazil supplies, in particular, thermoelectric plants that consume around 85% of production. The cement industry in the country, on the other hand, is supplied with approximately 6% of this coal, leaving 4% for the production of cellulose paper and only 5% in the food, ceramic and grain industries. Brazil has reserves of peat, lignite and hard coal. Coal totals 32 billion tons of reserves and is mainly located in Rio Grande do Sul (89.25% of the total), followed by Santa Catarina (10.41%). The Candiota (RS) deposit only has 38% of all the national coal. As it is an inferior quality coal, it is used only in thermoelectric power generation and at the deposit site. The oil crisis in the 1970s led the Brazilian government to create the Energy Mobilization Plan, with intense research to discover new coal reserves. The Geological Survey of Brazil, through works carried out in Rio Grande do Sul and Santa Catarina, greatly increased previously known coal reserves between 1970 and 1986 (mainly between 1978 and 1983). Then good quality coal, suitable for use in metallurgy and in large volumes (seven billion tons), was discovered in several deposits in Rio Grande do Sul (Morungava, Chico Lomã, Santa Teresinha), but at relatively great depths (up to 1,200 m), which has prevented its use until now. In 2011, coal represented only 5.6% of the energy consumed in Brazil, but it is an important strategic source, which can be activated when, for example, the water levels in the dams are very low, reducing the excess supply of water. hydroelectric power. This happened in 2013, when several thermoelectric plants were closed, thus maintaining the necessary supply, although at a higher cost.

Paraná is the largest producer of oil shale in Brazil. In the city of São Mateus do Sul, there is a plant Petrobras specialized in the production of the material. Approximately 7,800 tons are processed daily.

Rio Grande do Sul is an important producer of gemstones. Brazil is the world's largest producer of amethyst and agate, and Rio Grande do Sul is the country's largest producer. Agate has had local extraction since 1830. The largest producer of amethyst in Brazil is the city of Ametista do Sul. This stone was very rare and expensive throughout the world, until the discovery of large deposits in Brazil, which caused a considerable drop in its value.

=== Industry ===
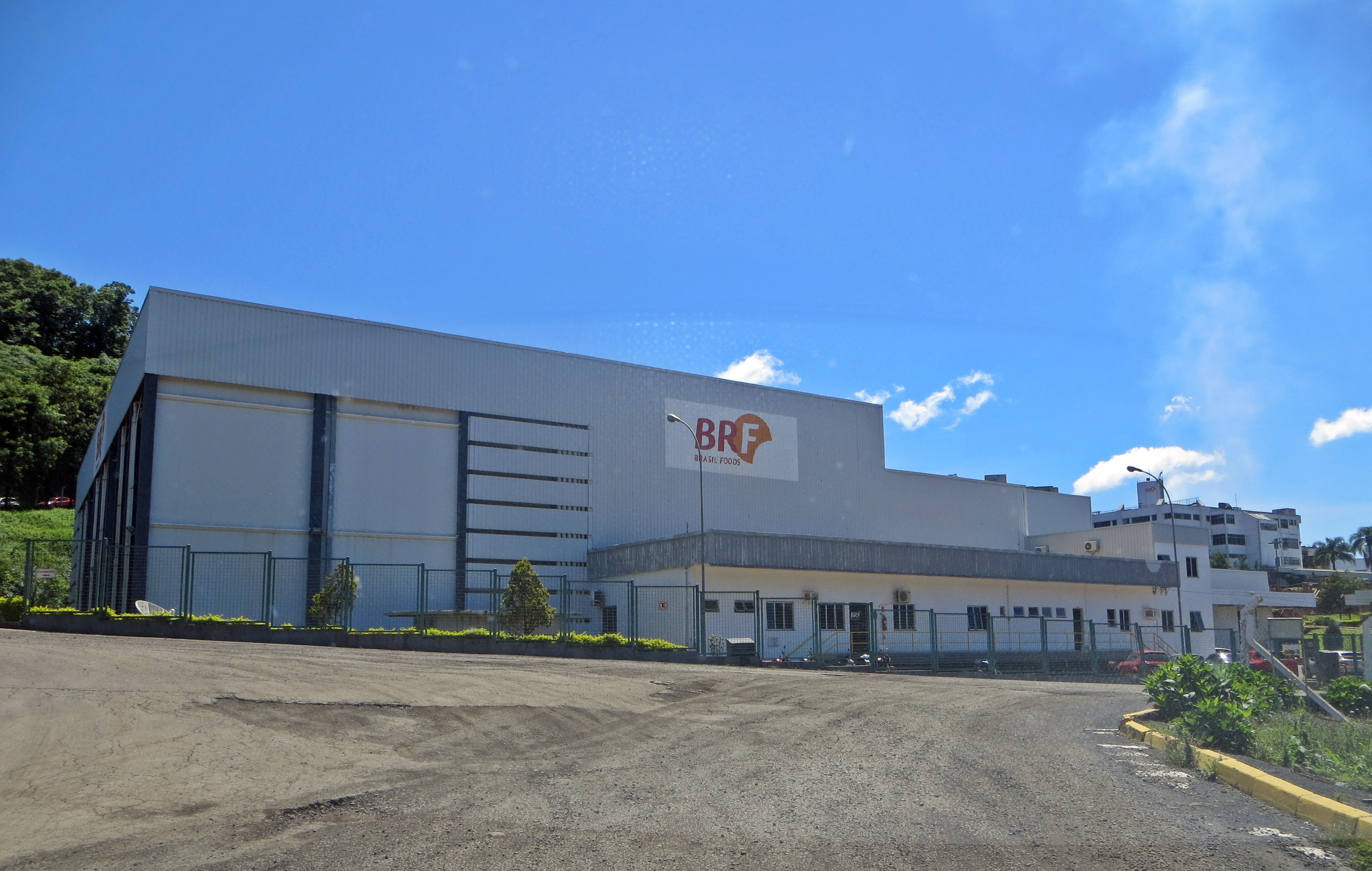
BRF meat factory in Santa Catarina.

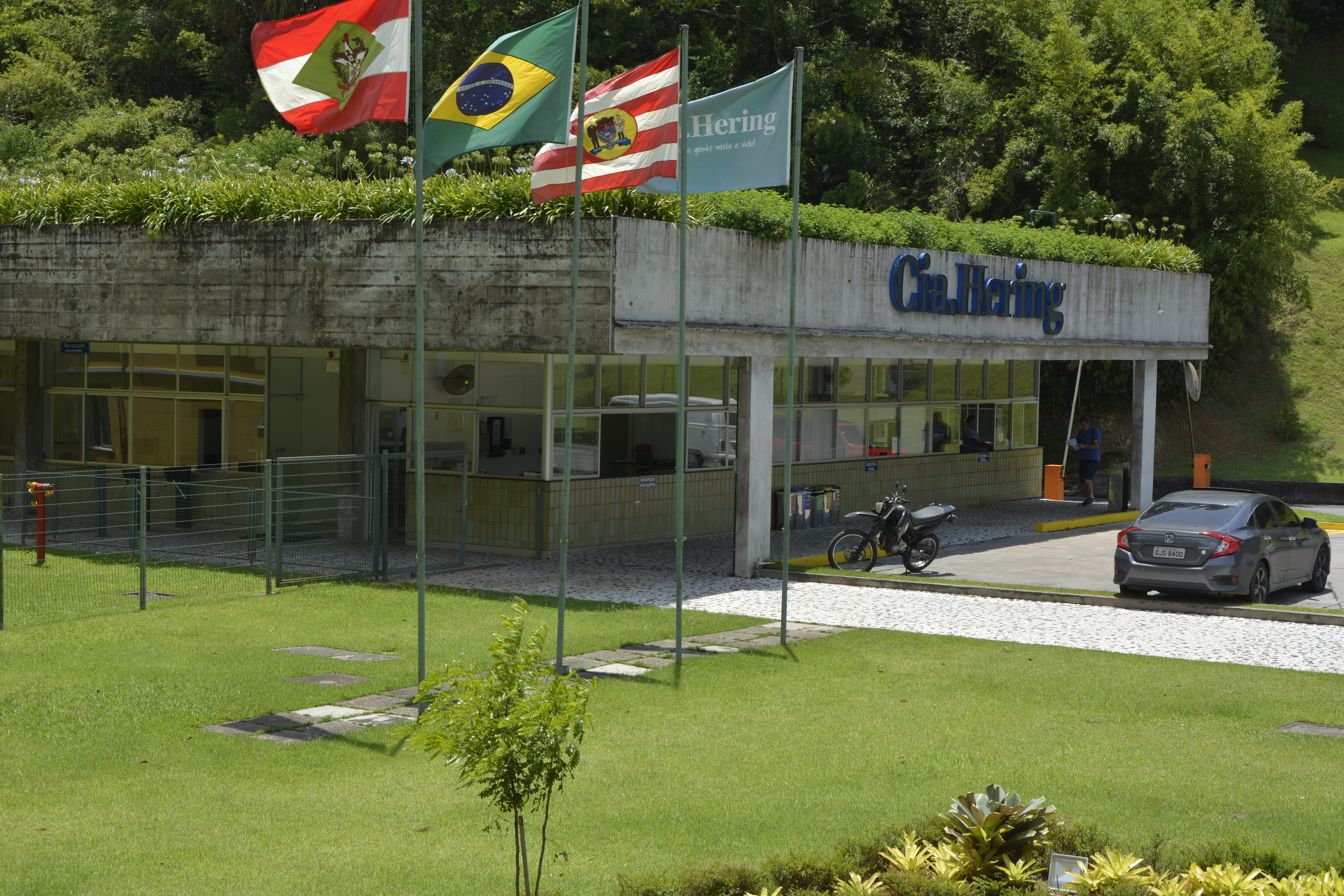
Hering textile industry in Santa Catarina.

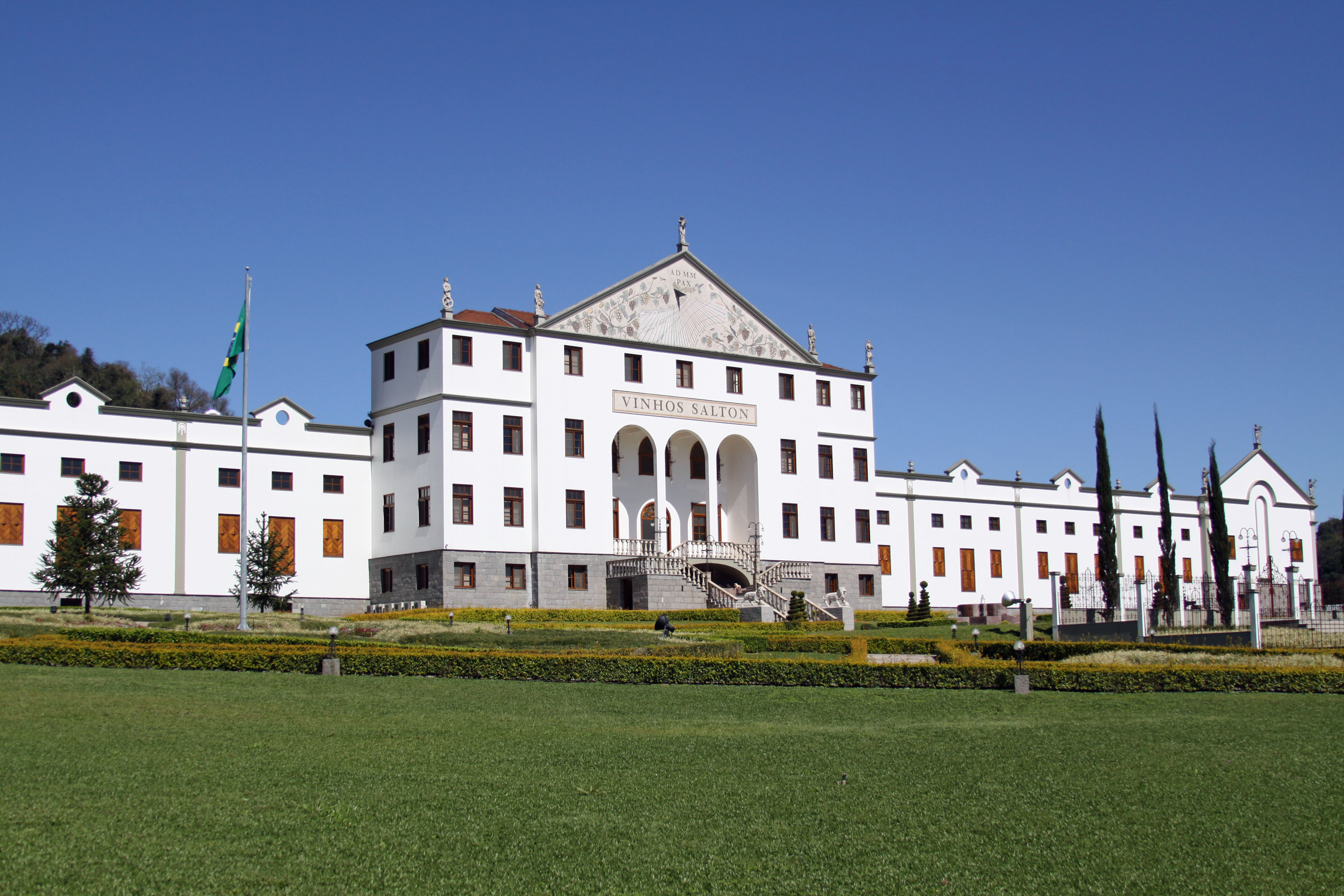
Salton winery in Rio Grande do Sul

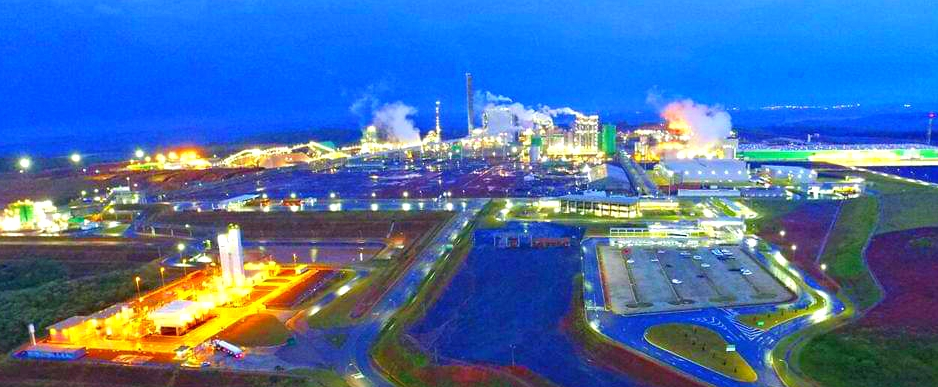
Klabin pulp and paper mill in Paraná

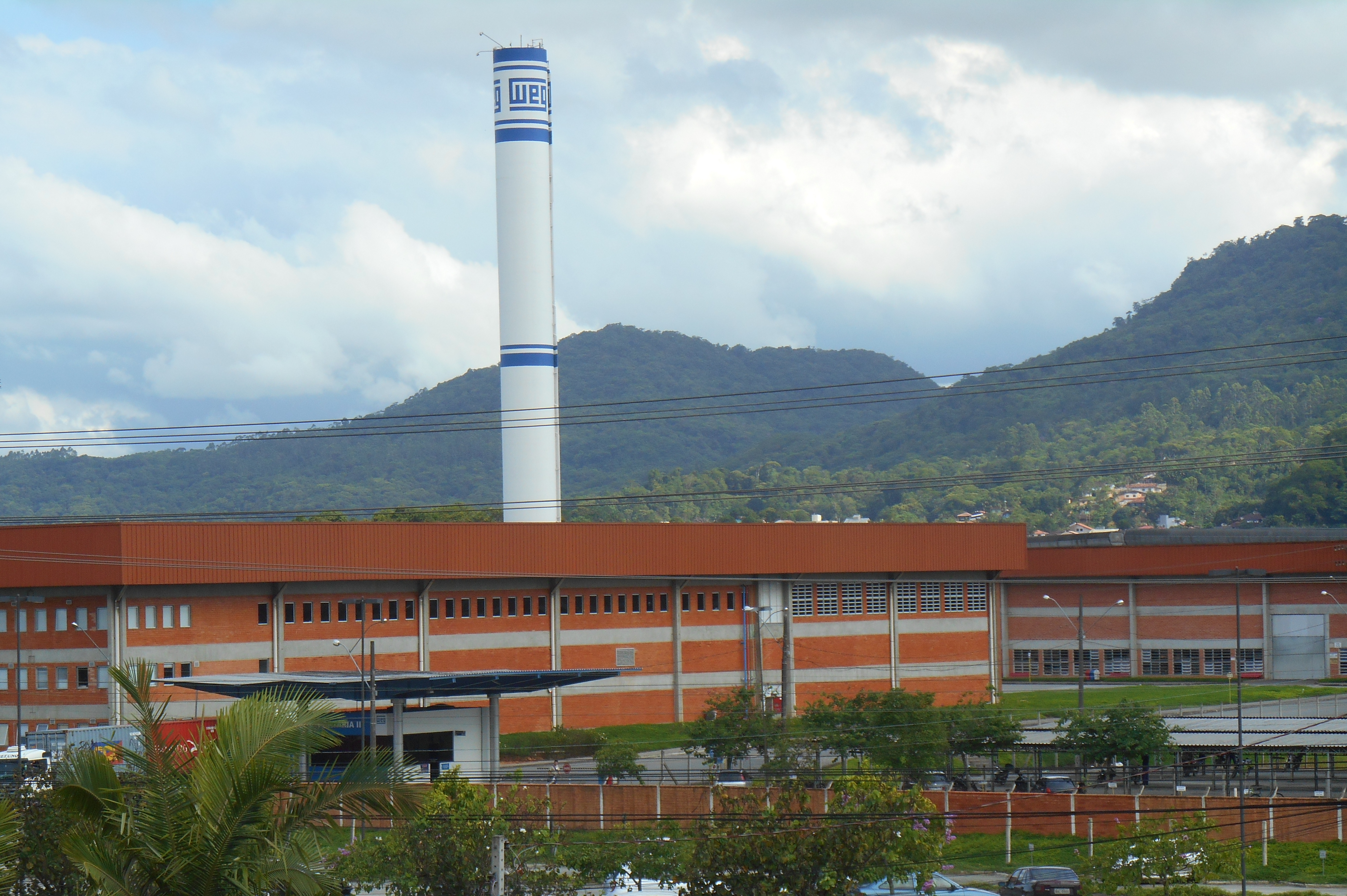
WEG Industries in Jaraguá do Sul, Santa Catarina

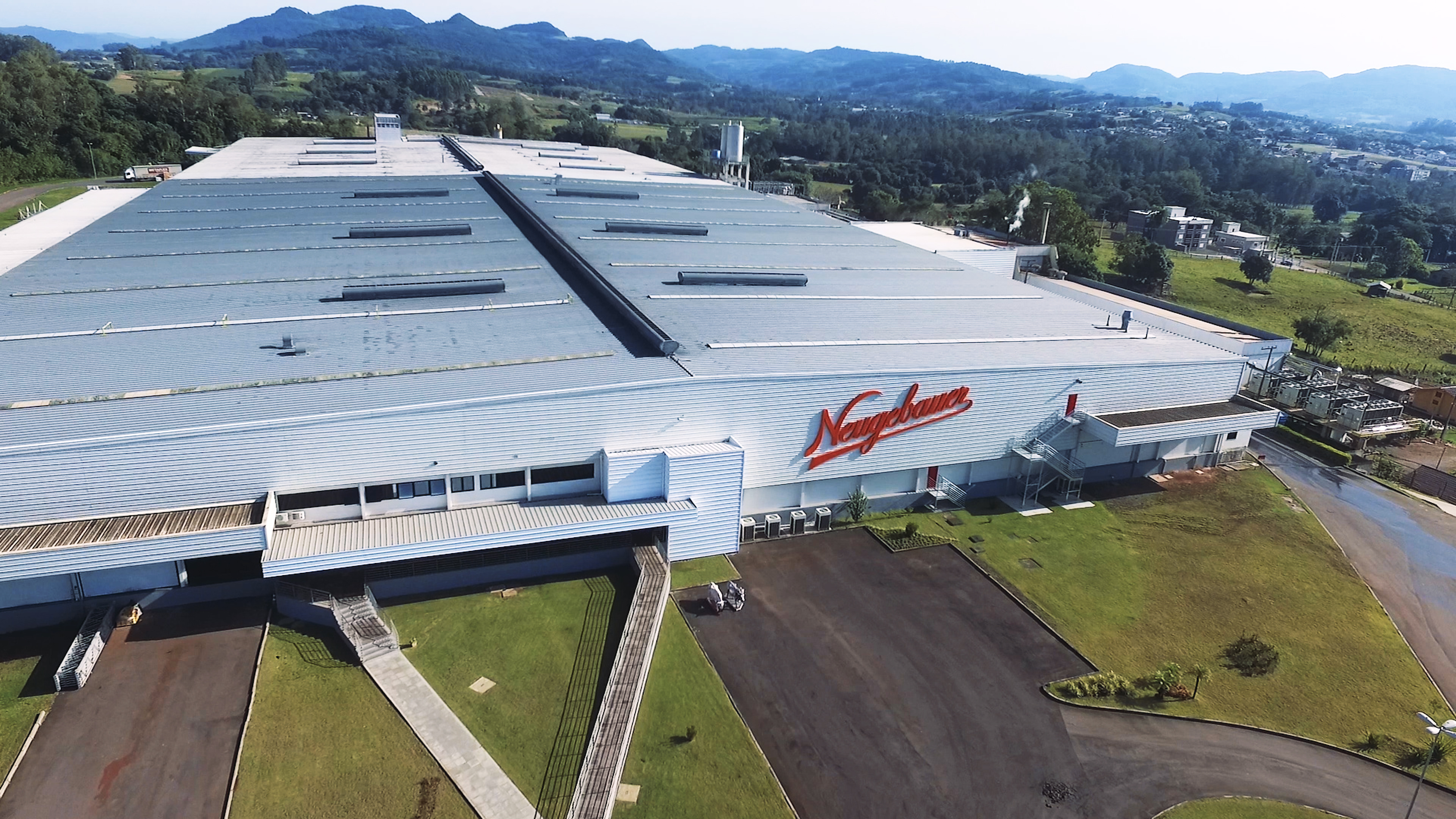
Neugebauer Chocolate Factory, Rio Grande do Sul

The region concentrates 20% of the industrial GDP of the country.

In 2019, Paraná was the second largest vehicle producer in the country (Brazil is one of the 10 largest vehicle producers in the world). Paraná has in its territory the Volkswagen, Renault, Audi, Volvo and DAF factories; Santa Catarina has GM and BMW plants and Rio Grande do Sul, a GM plant.

In the food industry, in 2019, Brazil was the second largest exporter of processed foods in the world, with a value of US$34.1 billion in exports. Regarding the creation of national or multinational companies, Rio Grande do Sul created companies such as Neugebauer, Camil Alimentos, Fruki, Cervejaria Polar, Vinícola Aurora and Vinícola Salton. Santa Catarina created companies such as Sadia and Perdigão (which later merged into BRF), Seara Alimentos (which today belongs to JBS), Aurora, Gomes da Costa, Cervejaria Eisenbahn and Hemmer Alimentos. Paraná created companies such as: Frimesa, C.Vale, Nutrimental, Copacol, Coopavel and Matte Leão.

In the footwear industry, in 2019 Brazil produced 972 million pairs, being the fourth largest producer in the world, behind China, India and Vietnam, and ranks 11th among the largest exporters. The Brazilian state that most exports the product is Rio Grande do Sul: in 2019 it exported US$448.35 million. Most of the product goes to the United States, Argentina and France. Santa Catarina also has a shoe production center in São João Batista.

In the textile industry, Brazil, despite being among the 5 largest producers in the world in 2013, and being representative in the consumption of textiles and clothing, had very little insertion in world trade. In 2015, Brazilian imports ranked 25th (US$5.5 billion). And in exports, it only ranked 40th in the world ranking. Brazil's participation in the world trade of textiles and clothing is only 0.3%, due to the difficulty of competing in price with producers in India and mainly in China. The South had 32.65% of the country's textile production. Santa Catarina is the second largest textile and clothing employer in Brazil. It held the national leadership in the manufacture of pillows and is the largest producer in Latin America and the second in the world in woven labels. It's the nation's largest exporter of toilet / kitchen linen, cotton terry fabrics and cotton knit shirts. Some of the most famous companies in the region are Hering, Malwee, Karsten and Haco.

In the electronics industry, the industry turnover in Brazil reached R $153.0 billion in 2019, around 3% of the national GDP. The number of employees in the sector was 234,500 people. Brazil has two large electroelectronic production poles, located in Campinas, in the State of São Paulo, and in the Manaus Free Zone, in the State of Amazonas. The country also has other smaller centers, one of which is Curitiba, the capital of Paraná. The Curitiba technology center has companies such as Siemens and Positivo Informática. In total, 87 companies and 16 thousand employees work in Tecnoparque, an area of 127 thousand square meters created by state law in 2007. Tecnoparque can grow to 400 thousand square meters and receive up to four times the number of workers it has today, reaching 68 thousand people.

In the home appliance industry, sales of so-called "white line" equipment were 12.9 million units in 2017. The sector had its sales peak in 2012, with 18.9 million units. The brands that sold the most were Brastemp, Electrolux, Consul and Philips. Consul is originally from Santa Catarina, merged with Brastemp and today is part of the multinational Whirlpool Corporation. Another famous brand from the South was Prosdócimo, founded in Curitiba, which was sold to Electrolux. In the small electrical appliances sector, the Britânia company is originally from Curitiba.

In the metallurgical sector, the South has one of the most famous companies in the country, Tramontina, which employs more than 8,500 employees and has 10 production units. Other famous companies in the South are Marcopolo, a bus body manufacturer, which had a market value of R $2.782 billion in 2015, and Randon, a group of 9 companies specialized in transport solutions, which groups together vehicle manufacturers, auto parts, and road equipment – employs around 11 thousand people and recorded gross sales in 2017 of R $4.2 billion.

In Santa Catarina, the machinery and equipment industry stands out in the manufacture of compressors, being a leader in exports of this product among the states of the country, in addition to being an important producer of forestry equipment. In metallurgy, the state has the largest national manufacturer of sinks, vats and stainless steel tanks, trophies and medals, fasteners (screws, nuts, etc.), jacketed tanks for fuels, industrial pressure vessels and malleable iron connections. It is the world leader in engine blocks and iron heads, being the largest exporter of this product in Brazil.

In the pulp and paper sector, Brazilian pulp production was 19,691 million tons in 2019. The country exported US$7.48 billion in pulp this year, US$3.25 billion to China alone. Exports of the Brazilian forest industry totaled US$9.7 billion (US$7.48 billion in pulp, US$2 billion in paper, and US$265 million in wood panels). Paper production was 10,535 million tons in 2019. The country exported 2,163 million tons. In 2016, the pulp and paper industry in the south of the country represented 33% of the national total. This year, Paraná was the national leader in the production of roundwood (mainly eucalyptus) for the pulp and paper industry (15.9 million m^{3}); Brazil was the second country that produced the most pulp in the world and the eighth in the production of paper. The city that produced the most these woods in Brazil was Telêmaco Borba (PR), and the fifth largest was Ortigueira (PR).

== Energy ==
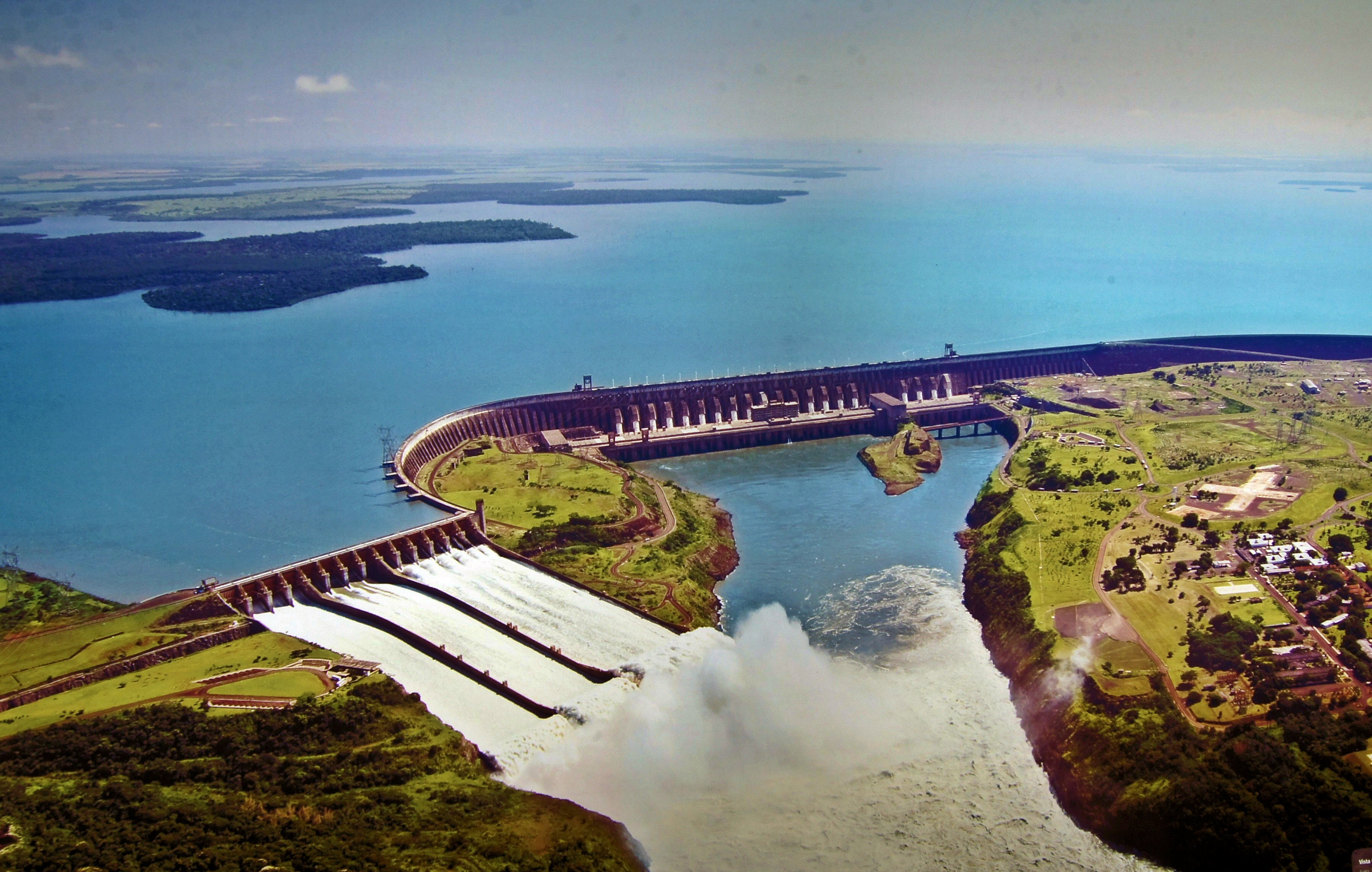
Itaipu Dam in Paraná

The South is rich in oil shale and mineral coal, which are used to generate energy in thermoelectric power plants. In addition to these minerals, the region also has an enormous amount of hydroelectric energy due to the characteristics of its hydrography — plateau rivers or rivers with large water flow.

The main hydroelectric power plant in the southern region of Brazil is Itaipu, opened to the public in 1983, which uses the water resources of the Paraná River in the vicinity of Foz do Iguaçu (Brazil) and Ciudad del Este (Paraguay).

Besides meeting the needs of public and private lighting in southern Brazil at night, energy from Itaipu is widely used in other regions of the country, especially in the Southeast, which is more industrially developed. As it is a binational hydroelectric plant, Paraguay also uses the energy produced by Itaipu.

The Southern Region also currently has a significant portion of its energy coming from wind and solar power sources.

The electricity supply in the southern region is managed by Eletrosul, which serves Mato Grosso do Sul as well as other areas of Brazil, due to interconnections with the electricity system of the Southeast region.

== Tourism ==
During the summer, tourists greatly increase activity on the beaches of Santa Catarina. Florianópolis is one of the most visited state capitals in Brazil, after Rio de Janeiro and São Paulo. Other attractions include the Jesuit-Guarani Ruins of São Miguel das Missões, in Rio Grande do Sul, and Iguaçu National Park, in Paraná, both World Heritage Sites.

The mountainous regions of Rio Grande do Sul and Santa Catarina attract tourists during the winter, who enjoy the low temperatures. In Cambará do Sul, in the state of Rio Grande do Sul, lies Aparados da Serra National Park, where the Itaimbezinho Canyon is located.

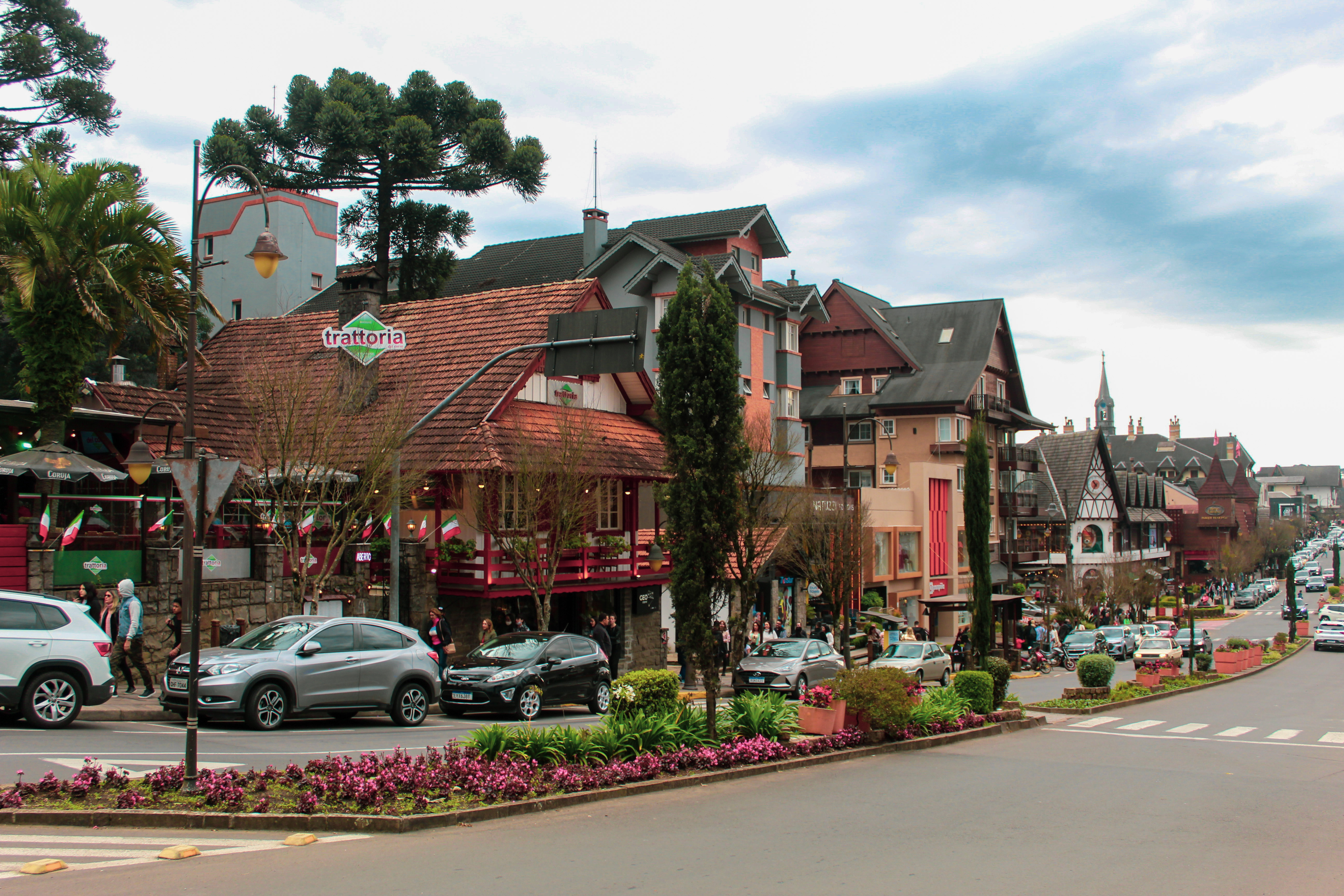
Gramado

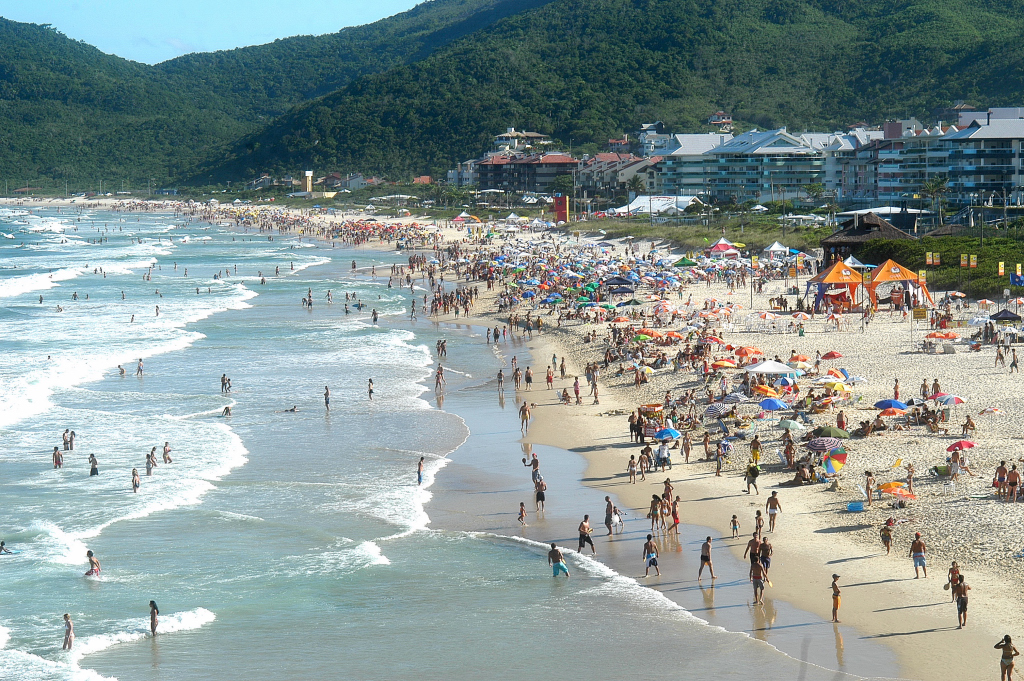
Beach in Florianópolis

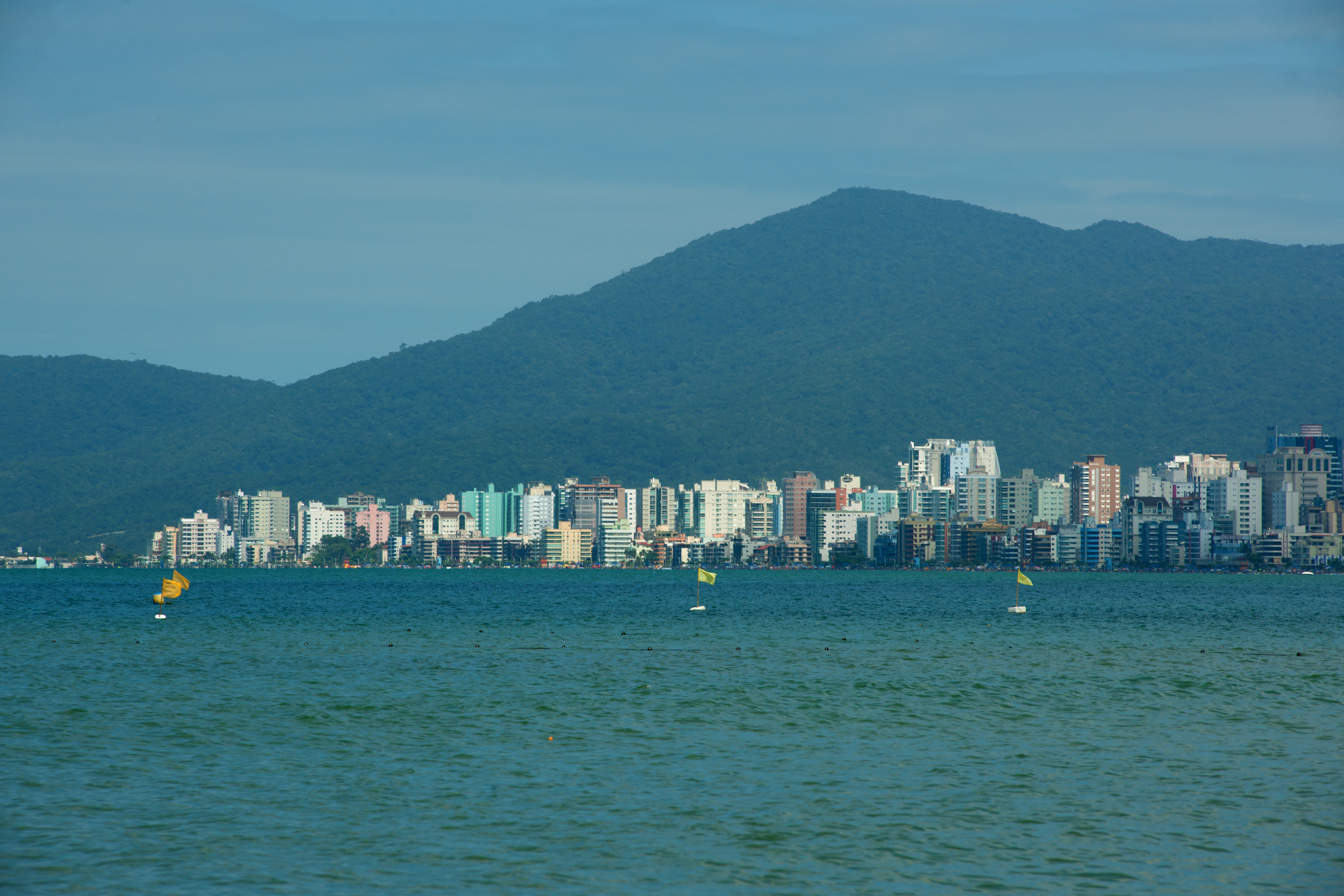
Itapema

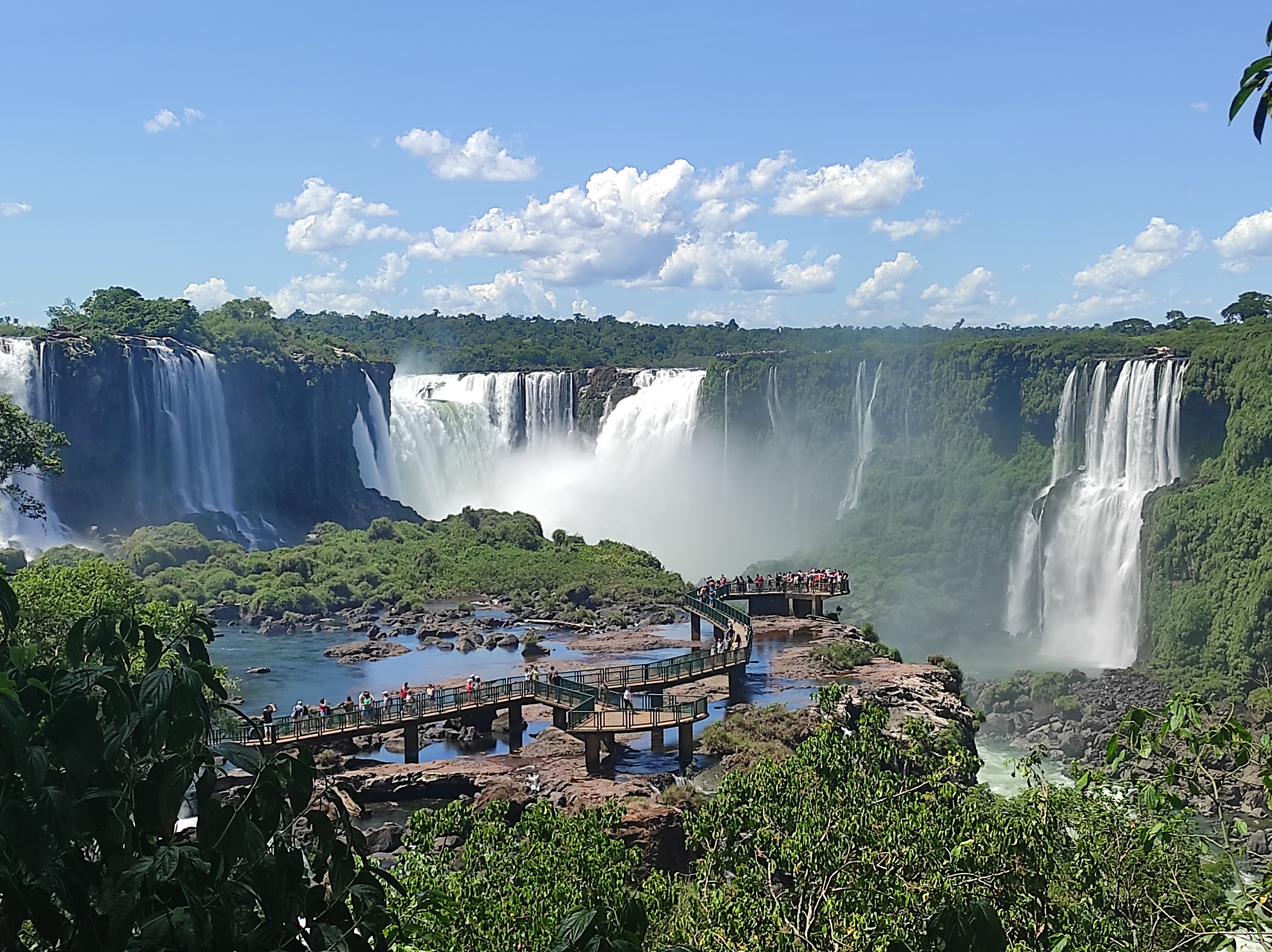
Iguazu Falls

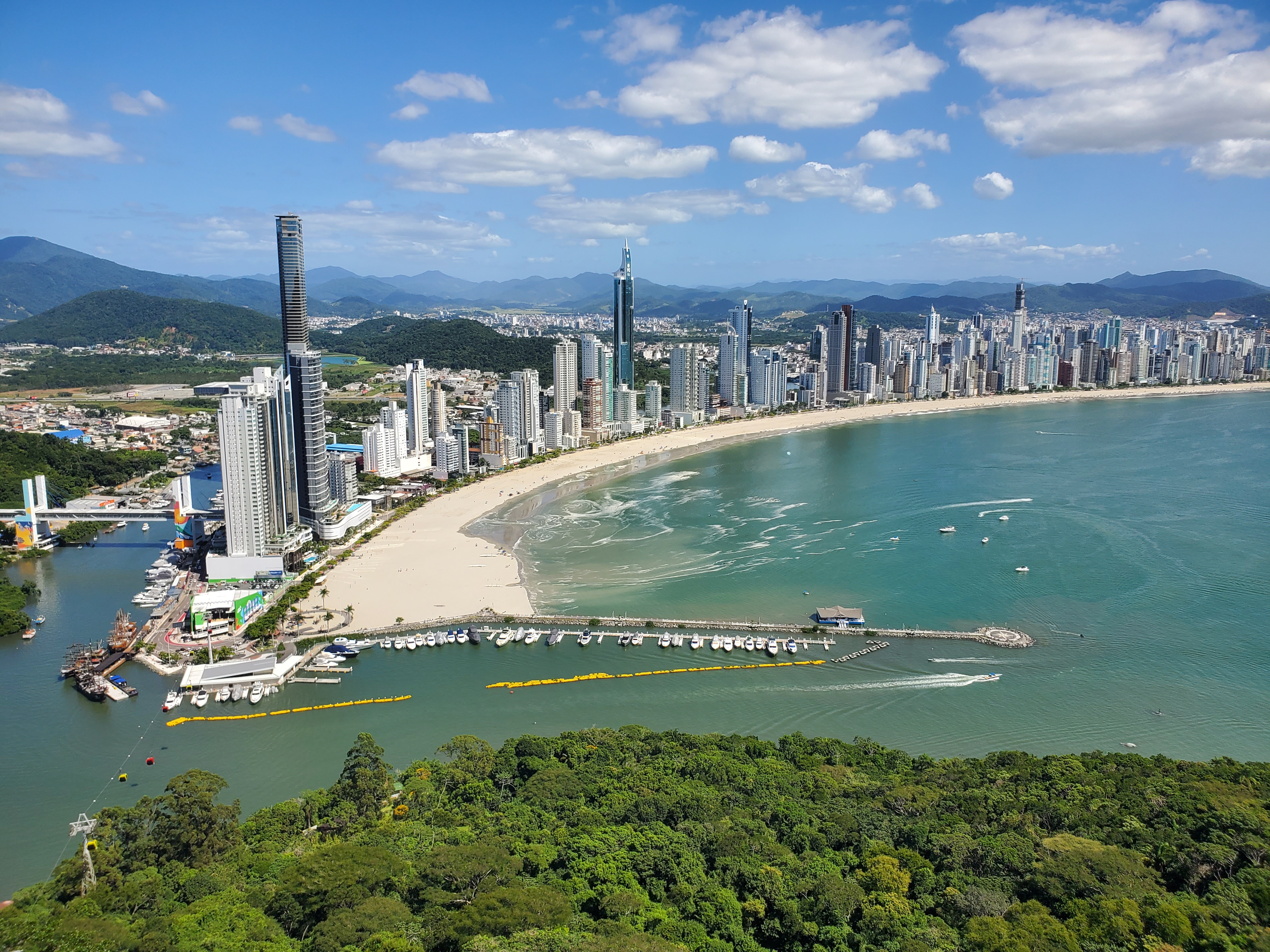
Balneário Camboriú

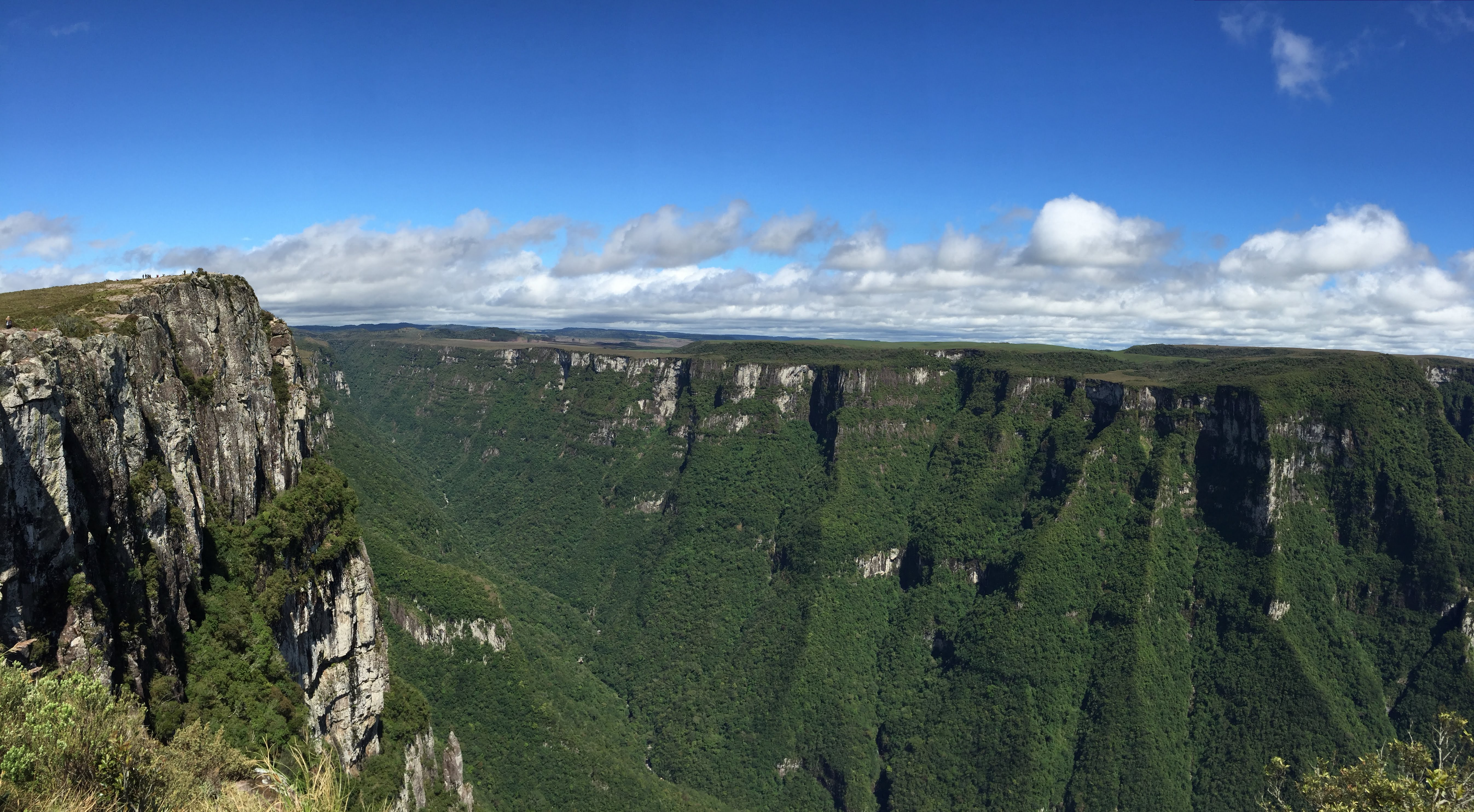
Aparados da Serra National Park

=== Palaeontological tourism ===
Rio Grande do Sul has a great potential for palaeontological tourism, with many paleontological sites and museums in Paleorrota. There is a large area in the center of the state that belongs to the Triassic. Here lived Rhynchosaur, thecodonts, exaeretodons, Staurikosaurus, Guaibasaurus, Saturnalia tupiniquim, Sacisaurus, Unaysaurus, and many others.

== See also ==
- Centro-Sul
- Gaúcho
- German Brazilians
- Immigration to Brazil
- Italian Brazilians
- Polish Brazilians
- Spanish immigration to Brazil
- Russian Brazilians
- The South Is My Country
