= Planalto, Rio Grande do Sul =

Municipality of Rio Grande do Sul, Brazil

Municipio de Planalto
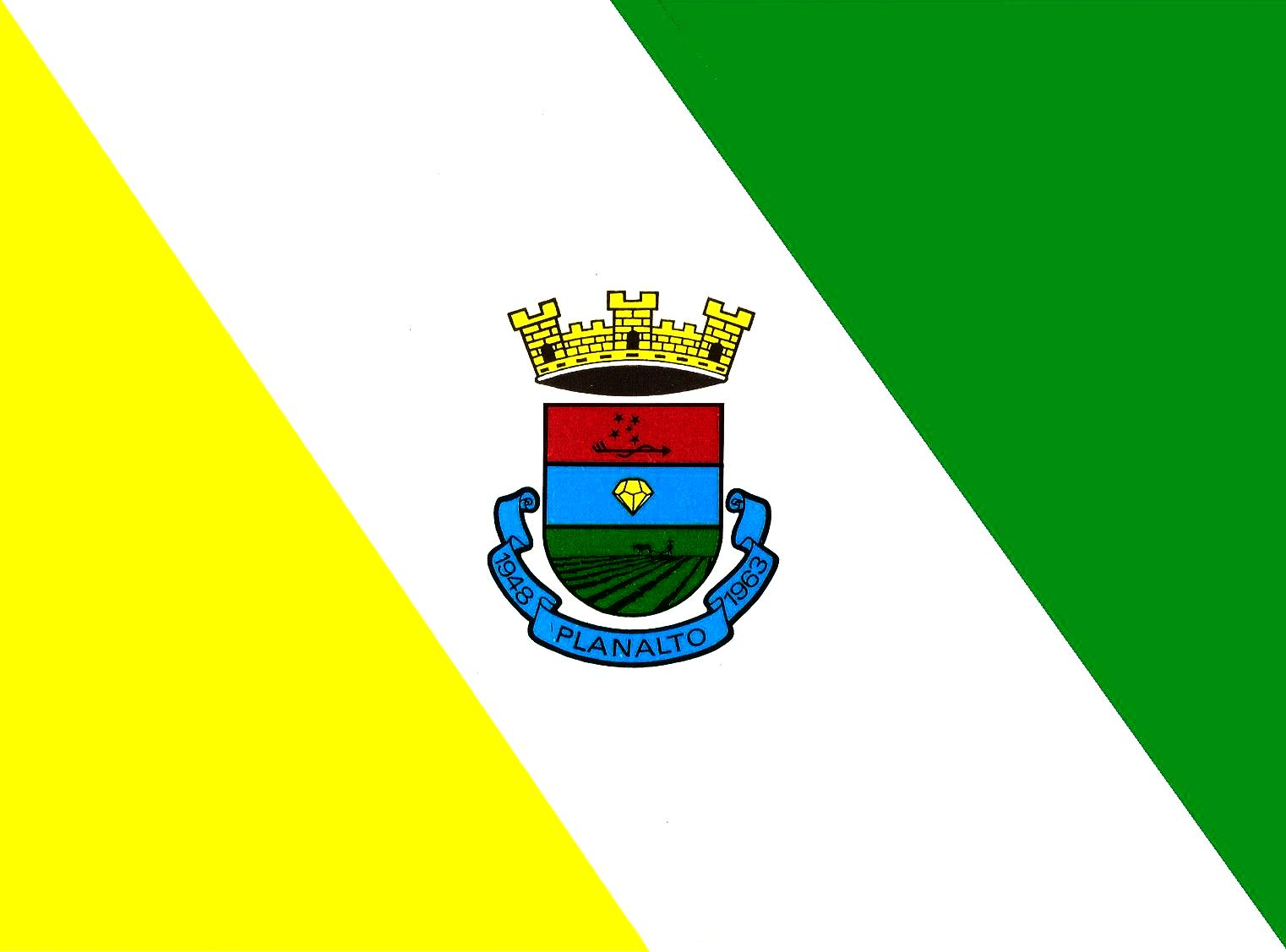
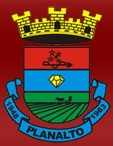
- Flag Coat of arms

- Location in Rio Grande Do Sul
- Coordinates: 27°19′44″S 53°03′32″W
- Country: Brazil
- Mesoregion: Noroeste Rio-Grandense
- Microregion: Frederico Westphalen
- Founded: 26 December 1963

Government
  - Mayor: Antonio Carlos Damin (PDT)

Area
  - Total: 230,417 km^{2} (88,965 sq mi)

Population (2020)
  - Total: 10,019
  - Density: 45.8/km^{2} (119/sq mi)
- Time zone: UTC−3 (BRT)

Planalto is a municipality in the state of Rio Grande do Sul, Brazil, located at 27°19′44″S 53°03′31″W, at an elevation of 568 meters above sea level. It has a total area of 237.35 km^{2}. Its estimated population in 2020 was 10,019 inhabitants.

The city is located in the confluence of the Rio Uruguay and Rio do Mel rivers, close to the border with the Brazilian state of Santa Catarina.

The municipality is part of the Hidrominerais region, in the microregion of Frederico Westphalen. It is located in the perimeter of the underground Aquífero Guarani.

== See also ==
- List of municipalities in Rio Grande do Sul
