= Taquaruçu do Sul =

Municipality in Rio Grande do Sul, Brazil

Coordinates: 27°24′00″S 53°28′01″W

- Municipality
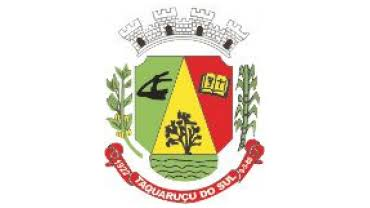
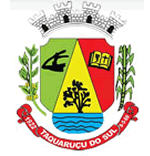
- Flag Coat of arms
- Interactive map of Taquaruçu do Sul
- Country: Brazil
- Time zone: UTC−3 (BRT)

Taquaruçu do Sul is a municipality in the state of Rio Grande do Sul, Brazil. As of 2020, the estimated population was 3,077.

It is located at a latitude of 27º24'00" South and a longitude of 53º28'02" West, being at an altitude of 545 meters above sea level.

== See also ==
- List of municipalities in Rio Grande do Sul
