= Cristal do Sul =

Municipality in Rio Grande do Sul, Brazil

Coordinates: 27°27′14″S 53°14′45″W

- Municipality
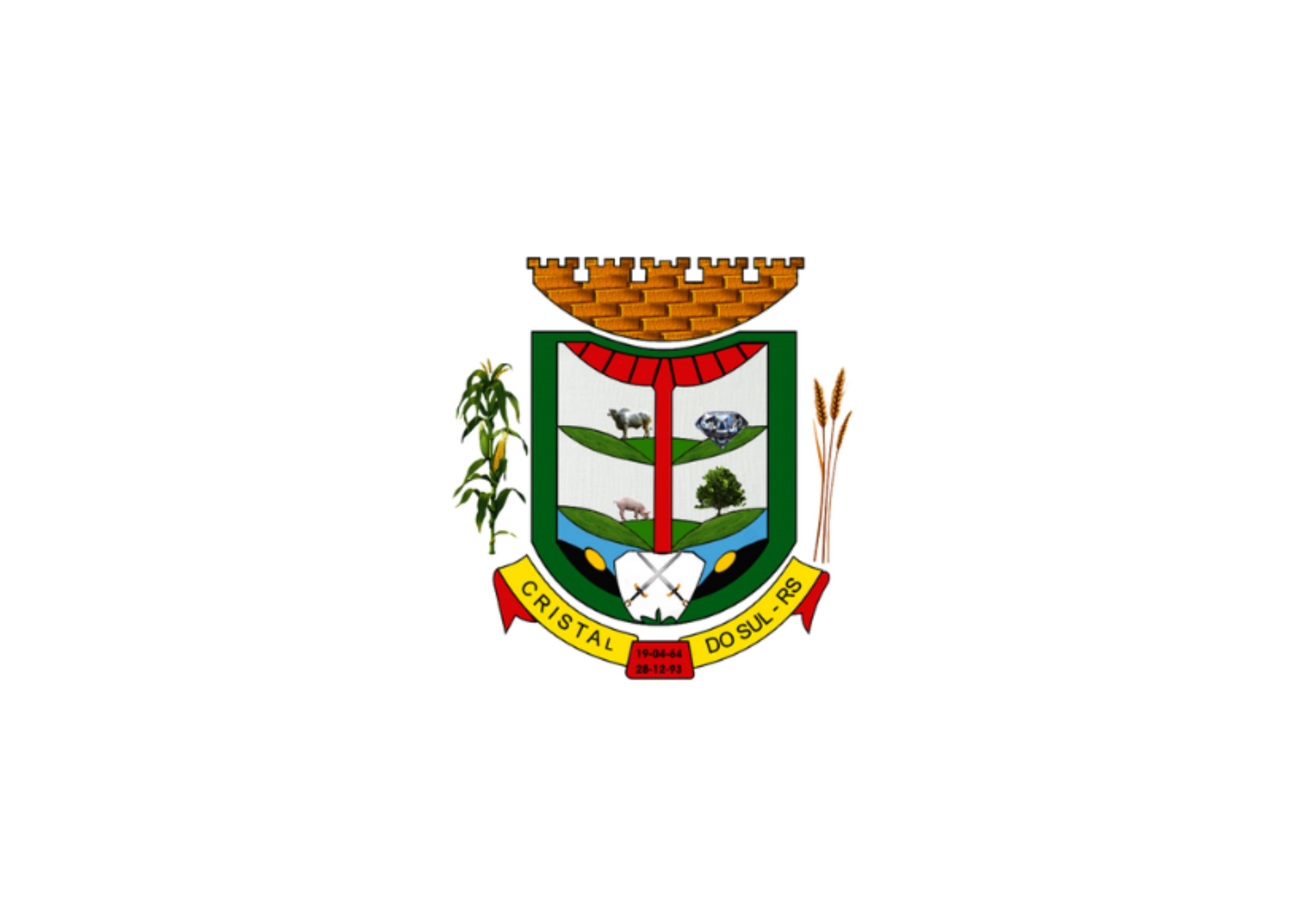
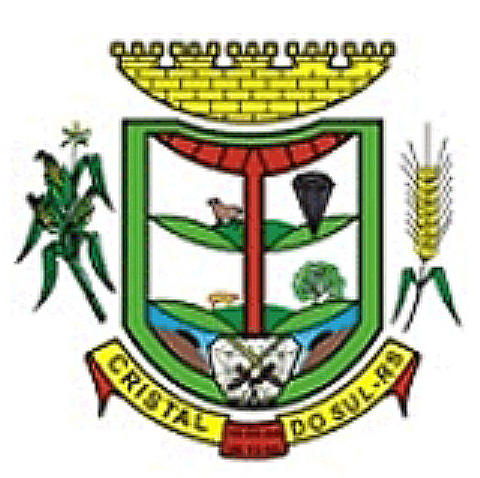
- Flag Coat of arms
- Interactive map of Cristal do Sul
- Country: Brazil
- Time zone: UTC−3 (BRT)

Cristal do Sul is a municipality in the state of Rio Grande do Sul, Brazil. As of 2020, the estimated population is 2,844.

== See also ==
- List of municipalities in Rio Grande do Sul
