= List of municipalities in Rio Grande do Sul by HDI =

This is a list of municipalities in Rio Grande do Sul ordered by Human Development Index (HDI) according to data released by the United Nations Development Program (UNDP) of the United Nations for the 2010. The Human Development Index was developed in 1990 by the Pakistani economist Mahbub ul Haq and the Indian economist Amartya Sen.

== Criteria ==
Map of HDI of the municipalities of Rio Grande do Sul. Legend: Very high High Medium Low Very low No data

=== Categories ===
The index varies from 0 to 1, considering:

- Very high – 0.800 to 1.000
- High – 0.700 to 0.799
- Medium – 0.600 to 0.699
- Low – 0.500 to 0.599
- Very low – 0.000 to 0.499

=== Components ===
The HDI of the municipalities is an average between the income index, life expectancy index and educational index.

== List ==
Rank	Municipalities	Data of 2010			
Rank	Municipalities	HDI	Income Index	Life Expectancy Index	Educational Index
Very high HDI
1	Porto Alegre	0.805	0.867	0.857	0.702
High HDI
2	Carlos Barbosa	0.796	0.835	0.835	0.724
3	Ipiranga do Sul	0.791	0.818	0.866	0.698
3	Três Arroios	0.791	0.843	0.851	0.689
5	Lagoa dos Três Cantos	0.789	0.765	0.852	0.754
6	Garibaldi	0.786	0.825	0.856	0.688
7	Casca	0.785	0.778	0.847	0.733
7	Nova Araçá	0.785	0.796	0.843	0.722
9	Santa Maria	0.784	0.795	0.848	0.715
9	Ivoti	0.784	0.780	0.848	0.729
11	Horizontina	0.783	0.782	0.858	0.716
12	Caxias do Sul	0.782	0.812	0.860	0.686
13	Ijuí	0.781	0.786	0.858	0.707
14	Nova Petrópolis	0.780	0.775	0.890	0.688
14	Vista Alegre do Prata	0.780	0.809	0.847	0.692
16	Bento Gonçalves	0.778	0.805	0.842	0.695
16	Nova Bréscia	0.778	0.836	0.847	0.666
16	Lajeado	0.778	0.796	0.840	0.704
19	Sarandi	0.777	0.776	0.858	0.705
19	Selbach	0.777	0.785	0.841	0.710
19	Victor Graeff	0.777	0.774	0.840	0.722
19	Farroupilha	0.777	0.783	0.861	0.696
23	Passo Fundo	0.776	0.787	0.849	0.699
23	Erechim	0.776	0.782	0.833	0.716
25	Marau	0.774	0.773	0.857	0.699
26	Santa Cruz do Sul	0.773	0.782	0.852	0.693
26	Paraí	0.773	0.787	0.866	0.679
26	Veranópolis	0.773	0.797	0.838	0.692
29	Santo Ângelo	0.772	0.765	0.863	0.696
29	Aratiba	0.772	0.801	0.856	0.670
31	Santa Rosa	0.769	0.752	0.871	0.693
31	Arroio do Meio	0.769	0.750	0.860	0.706
33	Nova Boa Vista	0.768	0.764	0.836	0.708
33	Três Passos	0.768	0.745	0.858	0.710
33	São Marcos	0.768	0.775	0.855	0.683
36	Novo Xingu	0.767	0.749	0.850	0.708
36	Encantado	0.767	0.764	0.858	0.687
36	Estrela	0.767	0.776	0.850	0.684
39	Nova Prata	0.766	0.782	0.839	0.686
39	Carazinho	0.766	0.756	0.840	0.707
39	Santiago	0.766	0.746	0.882	0.682
39	Capivari do Sul	0.766	0.805	0.836	0.668
43	Não-Me-Toque	0.765	0.784	0.847	0.673
43	Colinas	0.765	0.786	0.840	0.678
43	Ibirubá	0.765	0.786	0.848	0.671
43	Guaporé	0.765	0.781	0.837	0.685
43	Espumoso	0.765	0.747	0.884	0.677
48	Cerro Largo	0.764	0.752	0.849	0.698
48	Montauri	0.764	0.790	0.852	0.662
48	Gramado	0.764	0.783	0.861	0.662
48	São Valentim do Sul	0.764	0.776	0.848	0.677
48	Rondinha	0.764	0.780	0.842	0.678
48	Imbé	0.764	0.825	0.847	0.638
48	Santo Antônio do Palma	0.764	0.787	0.853	0.665
55	Barra Funda	0.763	0.731	0.856	0.710
55	São Pedro do Butiá	0.763	0.760	0.843	0.694
55	Fagundes Varela	0.763	0.773	0.852	0.674
55	São Domingos do Sul	0.763	0.780	0.839	0.680
59	Boa Vista do Buricá	0.762	0.761	0.834	0.697
59	Torres	0.762	0.750	0.862	0.685
59	Saldanha Marinho	0.762	0.745	0.841	0.706
59	David Canabarro	0.762	0.740	0.870	0.688
63	Panambi	0.761	0.752	0.848	0.691
63	Nova Pádua	0.761	0.762	0.852	0.678
63	Vila Maria	0.761	0.791	0.839	0.664
66	Serafina Corrêa	0.760	0.755	0.843	0.690
66	Itaara	0.760	0.761	0.841	0.687
66	Campinas do Sul	0.760	0.753	0.842	0.691
66	Tapejara	0.760	0.763	0.837	0.688
66	Frederico Westphalen	0.760	0.754	0.846	0.688
71	Três de Maio	0.759	0.756	0.834	0.694
71	Santo Antônio do Planalto	0.759	0.701	0.885	0.705
71	Nova Candelária	0.759	0.794	0.856	0.643
74	Picada Café	0.758	0.738	0.842	0.701
74	Colorado	0.758	0.775	0.835	0.674
74	Guabiju	0.758	0.831	0.857	0.612
74	Antônio Prado	0.758	0.777	0.835	0.671
78	Presidente Lucena	0.757	0.727	0.885	0.674
78	Vista Gaúcha	0.757	0.774	0.839	0.669
78	Cachoeirinha	0.757	0.749	0.857	0.675
78	Estância Velha	0.757	0.749	0.887	0.652
78	Vanini	0.757	0.736	0.836	0.704
78	Dois Lajeados	0.757	0.775	0.837	0.670
78	Chapada	0.757	0.752	0.849	0.679
85	Quinze de Novembro	0.756	0.783	0.841	0.655
85	Fortaleza dos Valos	0.756	0.779	0.837	0.663
87	São José do Ouro	0.755	0.759	0.846	0.669
87	Montenegro	0.755	0.761	0.866	0.654
89	Flores da Cunha	0.754	0.786	0.849	0.642
89	Constantina	0.754	0.726	0.885	0.668
89	São Vendelino	0.754	0.743	0.852	0.677
89	Esteio	0.754	0.769	0.843	0.662
93	Salvador das Missões	0.753	0.710	0.851	0.706
93	Ajuricaba	0.753	0.763	0.850	0.658
93	Nicolau Vergueiro	0.753	0.772	0.839	0.660
93	Estação	0.753	0.752	0.843	0.674
97	Westfália	0.752	0.796	0.849	0.630
97	Monte Belo do Sul	0.752	0.752	0.852	0.663
97	Severiano de Almeida	0.752	0.738	0.861	0.670
100	Sertão	0.751	0.746	0.837	0.678
100	Osório	0.751	0.769	0.853	0.646
102	Água Santa	0.750	0.840	0.850	0.590
102	Cruz Alta	0.750	0.754	0.858	0.653
102	Feliz	0.750	0.758	0.847	0.658
102	Canoas	0.750	0.768	0.864	0.636
106	Pareci Novo	0.749	0.738	0.852	0.668
106	Linha Nova	0.749	0.751	0.846	0.662
106	Harmonia	0.749	0.748	0.841	0.668
109	São João do Polêsine	0.748	0.748	0.847	0.661
109	Canela	0.748	0.738	0.849	0.667
109	Barão	0.748	0.767	0.836	0.652
112	Nova Bassano	0.747	0.778	0.849	0.632
112	Sananduva	0.747	0.764	0.843	0.647
112	São José do Inhacorá	0.747	0.723	0.822	0.702
112	Alto Alegre	0.747	0.756	0.859	0.642
112	Novo Hamburgo	0.747	0.778	0.852	0.629
112	Tapera	0.747	0.743	0.835	0.672
112	Teutônia	0.747	0.751	0.855	0.650
112	Charqueadas	0.747	0.726	0.870	0.659
112	Condor	0.747	0.735	0.852	0.666
112	Tucunduva	0.747	0.748	0.816	0.682
112	Bom Princípio	0.746	0.751	0.836	0.661
112	Getúlio Vargas	0.746	0.747	0.843	0.658
112	Coqueiros do Sul	0.746	0.806	0.840	0.614
112	Santa Tereza	0.746	0.765	0.853	0.637
112	Mato Leitão	0.746	0.721	0.853	0.676
112	Muçum	0.746	0.757	0.840	0.654
112	Capitão	0.746	0.747	0.842	0.661
129	Bozano	0.745	0.773	0.853	0.628
129	Campo Bom	0.745	0.755	0.852	0.643
131	Nova Palma	0.744	0.762	0.841	0.643
131	Rio Grande	0.744	0.752	0.861	0.637
131	Coronel Barros	0.744	0.793	0.852	0.610
131	Uruguaiana	0.744	0.722	0.863	0.661
131	Poço das Antas	0.744	0.742	0.877	0.634
136	Imigrante	0.743	0.764	0.844	0.635
136	Capão da Canoa	0.743	0.756	0.852	0.637
136	Dois Irmãos	0.743	0.763	0.848	0.633
136	Augusto Pestana	0.743	0.779	0.847	0.621
136	Morro Reuter	0.743	0.733	0.858	0.653
136	Sobradinho	0.743	0.735	0.861	0.647
142	Cachoeira do Sul	0.742	0.739	0.854	0.648
142	Vila Flores	0.742	0.725	0.867	0.650
142	Tio Hugo	0.742	0.709	0.845	0.682
142	Silveira Martins	0.742	0.744	0.852	0.644
142	Nova Ramada	0.742	0.752	0.847	0.642
147	Nova Roma do Sul	0.741	0.794	0.851	0.602
147	Cotiporã	0.741	0.767	0.835	0.636
147	Pejuçara	0.741	0.724	0.867	0.648
147	São Luiz Gonzaga	0.741	0.718	0.855	0.664
151	Alegrete	0.740	0.720	0.849	0.664
151	Bagé	0.740	0.739	0.848	0.647
151	Nova Alvorada	0.740	0.763	0.838	0.634
151	Arroio do Sal	0.740	0.740	0.844	0.649
151	Anta Gorda	0.740	0.742	0.868	0.630
151	Salvador do Sul	0.740	0.750	0.843	0.641
151	Santa Clara do Sul	0.740	0.747	0.843	0.644
151	Almirante Tamandaré do Sul	0.740	0.732	0.828	0.669
159	Bom Retiro do Sul	0.739	0.725	0.857	0.649
159	São Pedro da Serra	0.739	0.748	0.851	0.634
159	Vista Alegre	0.739	0.760	0.842	0.631
159	São Sebastião do Caí	0.739	0.734	0.852	0.646
159	Carlos Gomes	0.739	0.732	0.886	0.622
159	Catuípe	0.739	0.763	0.842	0.627
159	Ibiaçá	0.739	0.766	0.888	0.593
159	São Leopoldo	0.739	0.766	0.861	0.612
159	Taquaruçu do Sul	0.739	0.768	0.830	0.633
159	Santo Augusto	0.739	0.753	0.840	0.637
159	Pelotas	0.739	0.758	0.844	0.632
170	Humaitá	0.738	0.732	0.837	0.657
170	Lagoa Vermelha	0.738	0.734	0.885	0.620
170	Campina das Missões	0.738	0.698	0.849	0.677
170	Santo Cristo	0.738	0.746	0.820	0.656
170	Gaurama	0.738	0.733	0.852	0.643
175	Vera Cruz	0.737	0.738	0.842	0.643
175	Palmeira das Missões	0.737	0.722	0.831	0.667
175	Guarani das Missões	0.737	0.698	0.863	0.665
175	Vale Real	0.737	0.739	0.850	0.636
179	São Borja	0.736	0.720	0.860	0.643
179	Gravataí	0.736	0.727	0.862	0.636
179	Camargo	0.736	0.762	0.854	0.612
182	Xangri-Lá	0.735	0.740	0.852	0.630
182	Nova Esperança do Sul	0.735	0.723	0.848	0.647
184	Alto Feliz	0.734	0.740	0.886	0.603
184	Barra do Guarita	0.734	0.696	0.845	0.672
186	Taquari	0.733	0.737	0.849	0.629
186	Triunfo	0.733	0.717	0.873	0.629
186	Protásio Alves	0.733	0.771	0.839	0.609
186	União da Serra	0.733	0.786	0.852	0.587
186	Gentil	0.733	0.710	0.863	0.643
191	São Jorge	0.732	0.750	0.846	0.617
191	Santo Expedito do Sul	0.732	0.679	0.853	0.677
191	Chiapetta	0.732	0.702	0.850	0.657
191	Rodeio Bonito	0.732	0.733	0.842	0.636
195	Relvado	0.731	0.765	0.868	0.588
195	Soledade	0.731	0.727	0.861	0.625
195	Boa Vista do Incra	0.731	0.703	0.867	0.641
198	Guaíba	0.730	0.732	0.833	0.639
198	Mariano Moro	0.730	0.763	0.843	0.604
198	Ilópolis	0.730	0.756	0.866	0.595
201	Cidreira	0.729	0.730	0.848	0.625
201	Roca Sales	0.729	0.753	0.853	0.602
203	Boa Vista do Sul	0.728	0.770	0.852	0.587
203	Ipê	0.728	0.751	0.831	0.618
203	Cândido Godói	0.728	0.720	0.853	0.627
203	Tuparendi	0.728	0.734	0.832	0.632
207	Taquara	0.727	0.754	0.880	0.579
207	Coronel Pilar	0.727	0.766	0.835	0.600
207	Sant'Ana do Livramento	0.727	0.715	0.846	0.636
207	Mato Castelhano	0.727	0.752	0.839	0.608
211	São Martinho	0.726	0.734	0.830	0.628
211	Sapucaia do Sul	0.726	0.726	0.844	0.624
211	Jacutinga	0.726	0.703	0.855	0.636
214	Ponte Preta	0.725	0.727	0.874	0.600
214	São José do Sul	0.725	0.774	0.836	0.590
214	Pontão	0.725	0.708	0.864	0.623
214	Miraguaí	0.725	0.744	0.837	0.613
214	Santa Bárbara do Sul	0.725	0.716	0.841	0.634
214	Santa Cecília do Sul	0.725	0.781	0.839	0.581
220	Ivorá	0.724	0.712	0.886	0.602
220	Ibiraiaras	0.724	0.739	0.835	0.615
220	Marcelino Ramos	0.724	0.735	0.834	0.618
220	Doutor Ricardo	0.724	0.749	0.855	0.593
220	Ronda Alta	0.724	0.729	0.867	0.600
225	Cruzeiro do Sul	0.723	0.746	0.833	0.607
225	Bom Progresso	0.723	0.700	0.840	0.643
225	Barra do Rio Azul	0.723	0.703	0.842	0.638
225	Seberi	0.723	0.706	0.865	0.620
225	Vespasiano Correa	0.723	0.758	0.855	0.584
225	Porto Xavier	0.723	0.687	0.876	0.628
231	Vacaria	0.721	0.740	0.838	0.605
231	Igrejinha	0.721	0.749	0.876	0.571
231	Giruá	0.721	0.707	0.842	0.629
234	São Valentim	0.720	0.745	0.820	0.612
234	Palmitinho	0.720	0.707	0.836	0.632
234	Faxinal do Soturno	0.720	0.732	0.854	0.597
234	Pinhal	0.720	0.701	0.852	0.624
234	André da Rocha	0.720	0.738	0.837	0.605
239	Tramandaí	0.719	0.727	0.842	0.606
239	Ciríaco	0.719	0.724	0.855	0.600
239	Barão de Cotegipe	0.719	0.745	0.842	0.593
239	Cruzaltense	0.719	0.724	0.849	0.605
239	Caibaté	0.719	0.709	0.857	0.611
244	Nova Santa Rita	0.718	0.716	0.853	0.606
244	Três Cachoeiras	0.718	0.722	0.847	0.606
244	Tupandi	0.718	0.742	0.836	0.597
247	Eldorado do Sul	0.717	0.717	0.844	0.609
247	São José do Herval	0.717	0.701	0.847	0.622
247	Santo Antônio da Patrulha	0.717	0.718	0.866	0.594
247	Mato Queimado	0.717	0.702	0.870	0.603
247	Viamão	0.717	0.720	0.866	0.591
247	Engenho Velho	0.717	0.735	0.821	0.611
253	Júlio de Castilhos	0.716	0.733	0.833	0.602
253	Ernestina	0.716	0.703	0.854	0.612
255	Pouso Novo	0.715	0.765	0.845	0.566
255	Putinga	0.715	0.745	0.873	0.563
255	Palmares do Sul	0.715	0.725	0.852	0.592
258	Mormaço	0.714	0.735	0.860	0.576
258	Glorinha	0.714	0.716	0.859	0.593
260	Canudos do Vale	0.713	0.751	0.840	0.574
260	Itaqui	0.713	0.687	0.843	0.626
260	Portão	0.713	0.725	0.856	0.584
263	Venâncio Aires	0.712	0.736	0.818	0.600
263	Santa Vitória do Palmar	0.712	0.709	0.861	0.591
263	Erebango	0.712	0.689	0.837	0.626
263	Lindolfo Collor	0.712	0.712	0.842	0.601
263	Sede Nova	0.712	0.751	0.886	0.543
263	Jaguari	0.712	0.734	0.866	0.567
263	Crissiumal	0.712	0.702	0.835	0.616
263	Eugênio de Castro	0.712	0.697	0.885	0.584
271	Morrinhos do Sul	0.711	0.720	0.842	0.593
271	Sapiranga	0.711	0.722	0.832	0.598
271	Paulo Bento	0.710	0.730	0.858	0.571
271	Pinheirinho do Vale	0.710	0.713	0.828	0.607
271	Três Coroas	0.710	0.740	0.829	0.584
271	Barracão	0.710	0.711	0.885	0.568
277	São Pedro do Sul	0.709	0.698	0.824	0.619
277	Tupanciretã	0.709	0.721	0.828	0.596
279	Dom Pedrito	0.708	0.715	0.848	0.585
279	Campos Borges	0.708	0.704	0.819	0.616
279	São Sepé	0.708	0.708	0.871	0.576
279	Tenente Portela	0.708	0.709	0.830	0.603
283	Derrubadas	0.707	0.664	0.846	0.628
283	Jaguarão	0.707	0.698	0.832	0.608
283	São José do Hortêncio	0.707	0.717	0.824	0.597
283	Áurea	0.707	0.715	0.841	0.588
283	Arroio do Tigre	0.707	0.708	0.848	0.589
288	Coxilha	0.706	0.693	0.866	0.586
288	Chuí	0.706	0.676	0.792	0.658
288	Campestre da Serra	0.706	0.713	0.886	0.557
288	Novo Barreiro	0.706	0.734	0.808	0.594
288	Paim Filho	0.706	0.725	0.870	0.558
288	Doutor Maurício Cardoso	0.706	0.707	0.840	0.593
294	Vila Lângaro	0.705	0.759	0.839	0.551
295	Quaraí	0.704	0.673	0.852	0.609
295	Parobé	0.704	0.700	0.886	0.562
295	Caçapava do Sul	0.704	0.699	0.855	0.585
298	Boa Vista do Cadeado	0.703	0.692	0.851	0.590
298	Caseiros	0.703	0.696	0.833	0.600
298	Campo Novo	0.703	0.677	0.866	0.593
298	Três Palmeiras	0.703	0.747	0.832	0.560
298	Entre Rios do Sul	0.703	0.709	0.857	0.572
303	Morro Redondo	0.702	0.719	0.864	0.557
303	Muitos Capões	0.702	0.711	0.873	0.558
303	Nonoai	0.702	0.703	0.833	0.591
303	Viadutos	0.702	0.715	0.864	0.561
307	Tabaí	0.701	0.694	0.834	0.595
307	Travesseiro	0.701	0.735	0.839	0.559
307	Mariana Pimentel	0.701	0.701	0.866	0.568
307	Centenário	0.701	0.707	0.856	0.569
311	Cacequi	0.700	0.680	0.807	0.626
311	Ubiretama	0.700	0.691	0.809	0.613
311	Boqueirão do Leão	0.700	0.725	0.843	0.562
Medium HDI
314	Lavras do Sul	0.699	0.683	0.868	0.577
314	Brochier	0.699	0.723	0.851	0.554
314	Rosário do Sul	0.699	0.705	0.841	0.576
314	Alvorada	0.699	0.694	0.874	0.564
314	São Gabriel	0.699	0.711	0.822	0.585
314	Maximiliano de Almeida	0.699	0.699	0.825	0.591
314	Caiçara	0.699	0.721	0.817	0.580
321	Porto Mauá	0.698	0.672	0.831	0.608
321	Candiota	0.698	0.704	0.860	0.562
321	Passo do Sobrado	0.698	0.726	0.851	0.551
321	Arroio dos Ratos	0.698	0.700	0.833	0.583
321	Fazenda Vilanova	0.698	0.726	0.841	0.557
326	Dona Francisca	0.697	0.718	0.831	0.568
326	Camaquã	0.697	0.715	0.819	0.578
326	Cambará do Sul	0.697	0.705	0.838	0.574
326	Maratá	0.697	0.729	0.862	0.540
330	Balneário Pinhal	0.696	0.710	0.836	0.567
330	São Jerônimo	0.696	0.734	0.822	0.560
332	Alegria	0.695	0.717	0.818	0.572
332	Tapes	0.695	0.699	0.862	0.556
334	Tupanci do Sul	0.694	0.688	0.818	0.595
334	São João da Urtiga	0.694	0.702	0.828	0.575
334	Arvorezinha	0.694	0.713	0.817	0.575
334	Agudo	0.694	0.752	0.847	0.524
338	Senador Salgado Filho	0.693	0.701	0.817	0.581
338	Independência	0.693	0.711	0.813	0.576
338	Porto Lucena	0.693	0.700	0.827	0.575
338	Rio Pardo	0.693	0.702	0.846	0.560
342	Coqueiro Baixo	0.692	0.703	0.886	0.532
342	São Paulo das Missões	0.692	0.688	0.825	0.584
342	Bossoroca	0.692	0.665	0.821	0.608
342	Machadinho	0.692	0.711	0.807	0.577
346	Arambaré	0.691	0.694	0.833	0.570
346	Iraí	0.691	0.684	0.819	0.590
346	Dom Pedro de Alcântara	0.691	0.697	0.820	0.577
349	Porto Vera Cruz	0.690	0.661	0.827	0.600
350	Muliterno	0.689	0.740	0.808	0.547
350	Tiradentes do Sul	0.689	0.705	0.815	0.569
350	Terra de Areia	0.689	0.699	0.829	0.565
350	Sertão Santana	0.689	0.737	0.832	0.534
350	Quatro Irmãos	0.689	0.695	0.833	0.565
350	Nova Hartz	0.689	0.694	0.836	0.563
350	Rolador	0.689	0.676	0.834	0.579
350	Butiá	0.689	0.691	0.848	0.558
358	Novo Cabrais	0.688	0.697	0.852	0.548
358	Rolante	0.688	0.708	0.830	0.553
358	Roque Gonzales	0.688	0.687	0.843	0.563
361	Salto do Jacuí	0.687	0.693	0.837	0.558
361	São Lourenço do Sul	0.687	0.722	0.849	0.528
361	Herval	0.687	0.730	0.843	0.527
361	Aceguá	0.687	0.703	0.852	0.541
361	Marques de Souza	0.687	0.743	0.849	0.515
361	Planalto	0.687	0.674	0.807	0.597
361	Trindade do Sul	0.687	0.675	0.787	0.610
368	Santo Antônio das Missões	0.686	0.672	0.835	0.576
368	General Câmara	0.686	0.704	0.832	0.552
368	Jóia	0.686	0.671	0.841	0.572
371	São Vicente do Sul	0.685	0.698	0.831	0.553
371	São Francisco de Paula	0.685	0.701	0.860	0.534
371	Liberato Salzano	0.685	0.680	0.810	0.583
371	Gramado dos Loureiros	0.685	0.662	0.832	0.584
371	Erval Seco	0.685	0.666	0.821	0.589
376	Maçambara	0.684	0.664	0.832	0.580
377	Toropi	0.683	0.680	0.822	0.569
377	Progresso	0.683	0.705	0.861	0.525
377	Restinga Seca	0.683	0.709	0.828	0.542
377	Sete de Setembro	0.683	0.682	0.810	0.577
377	Paverama	0.683	0.701	0.840	0.541
377	Forquetinha	0.683	0.743	0.886	0.484
383	Formigueiro	0.682	0.690	0.838	0.549
383	Maquiné	0.682	0.695	0.880	0.519
383	Ametista do Sul	0.682	0.697	0.809	0.562
386	Erval Grande	0.681	0.713	0.885	0.501
386	Minas do Leão	0.681	0.743	0.826	0.514
386	Itatiba do Sul	0.681	0.696	0.801	0.567
389	Entre-Ijuís	0.680	0.692	0.829	0.548
389	Esmeralda	0.680	0.669	0.827	0.569
391	Araricá	0.679	0.696	0.824	0.547
391	Estrela Velha	0.679	0.707	0.792	0.560
393	Pinhal Grande	0.678	0.672	0.804	0.577
393	Pedro Osório	0.678	0.683	0.829	0.551
393	Sagrada Família	0.678	0.669	0.782	0.596
396	Santa Maria do Herval	0.676	0.716	0.846	0.510
396	Boa Vista das Missões	0.676	0.666	0.825	0.561
396	Paraíso do Sul	0.676	0.692	0.831	0.537
396	Novo Tiradentes	0.676	0.679	0.805	0.566
400	São Francisco de Assis	0.675	0.681	0.818	0.552
401	Braga	0.674	0.656	0.830	0.563
401	Candelária	0.674	0.699	0.842	0.521
401	Cerro Grande	0.674	0.676	0.803	0.563
404	Inhacorá	0.673	0.647	0.807	0.585
405	Capão do Cipó	0.672	0.639	0.860	0.552
405	Alecrim	0.672	0.683	0.852	0.522
407	Alpestre	0.671	0.700	0.795	0.543
407	Sentinela do Sul	0.671	0.671	0.826	0.545
407	Garruchos	0.671	0.657	0.833	0.553
410	Lagoa Bonita do Sul	0.670	0.696	0.801	0.539
410	Dois Irmãos das Missões	0.670	0.646	0.797	0.585
410	Barra do Ribeiro	0.670	0.691	0.822	0.529
413	Arroio do Padre	0.669	0.756	0.860	0.461
413	Pirapó	0.669	0.656	0.824	0.553
413	Itati	0.669	0.692	0.827	0.524
416	São Miguel das Missões	0.667	0.674	0.821	0.537
417	Faxinalzinho	0.666	0.646	0.801	0.571
417	Bom Jesus	0.666	0.697	0.832	0.510
419	Quevedos	0.665	0.667	0.824	0.534
419	Coronel Bicaco	0.665	0.667	0.803	0.550
421	Itapuca	0.664	0.709	0.834	0.495
421	São Pedro das Missões	0.664	0.644	0.804	0.566
421	Mostardas	0.664	0.701	0.849	0.493
424	Floriano Peixoto	0.663	0.701	0.854	0.486
424	São José dos Ausentes	0.663	0.674	0.801	0.541
424	Santa Margarida do Sul	0.663	0.691	0.870	0.484
424	Novo Machado	0.663	0.674	0.796	0.543
428	Cacique Doble	0.662	0.677	0.810	0.528
428	Barra do Quaraí	0.662	0.659	0.802	0.548
428	Jacuizinho	0.662	0.730	0.817	0.487
428	Três Forquilhas	0.662	0.661	0.813	0.539
428	Vila Nova do Sul	0.662	0.645	0.827	0.544
433	Esperança do Sul	0.661	0.665	0.788	0.550
433	Pantano Grande	0.661	0.676	0.816	0.524
433	Fontoura Xavier	0.661	0.668	0.812	0.532
433	Pinheiro Machado	0.661	0.685	0.846	0.499
433	Cerro Branco	0.661	0.671	0.816	0.527
433	Riozinho	0.661	0.690	0.885	0.472
433	Capela de Santana	0.661	0.675	0.816	0.525
440	Cerro Grande do Sul	0.660	0.673	0.855	0.499
440	Cristal do Sul	0.660	0.641	0.826	0.542
442	Segredo	0.659	0.673	0.811	0.525
443	Jaboticaba	0.658	0.636	0.820	0.547
443	Piratini	0.658	0.672	0.821	0.517
445	Arroio Grande	0.657	0.673	0.807	0.522
445	Encruzilhada do Sul	0.657	0.677	0.875	0.478
445	Tunas	0.657	0.659	0.794	0.541
445	Itacurubi	0.657	0.692	0.804	0.509
449	Tavares	0.656	0.692	0.828	0.492
449	Rio dos Índios	0.656	0.645	0.804	0.545
449	Mata	0.656	0.660	0.807	0.529
452	Manoel Viana	0.655	0.686	0.766	0.534
452	Vitória das Missões	0.655	0.659	0.809	0.526
454	Dezesseis de Novembro	0.654	0.625	0.809	0.553
455	São Martinho da Serra	0.652	0.659	0.848	0.496
455	Sério	0.652	0.695	0.847	0.471
455	Ibarama	0.652	0.686	0.792	0.511
455	Caraá	0.652	0.661	0.830	0.505
459	São José das Missões	0.651	0.652	0.782	0.542
460	Pinhal da Serra	0.650	0.641	0.835	0.513
460	Barros Cassal	0.650	0.690	0.795	0.500
460	Monte Alegre dos Campos	0.650	0.667	0.822	0.501
460	Canguçu	0.650	0.683	0.819	0.491
464	Unistalda	0.649	0.626	0.804	0.542
464	Cerrito	0.649	0.657	0.824	0.504
464	Mampituba	0.649	0.650	0.813	0.517
467	Dilermando de Aguiar	0.648	0.681	0.864	0.463
468	Vale Verde	0.646	0.666	0.816	0.497
469	São Nicolau	0.645	0.658	0.778	0.523
470	Cristal	0.644	0.687	0.826	0.471
471	Lagoão	0.643	0.641	0.822	0.505
471	Hulha Negra	0.643	0.653	0.796	0.512
473	São Valério do Sul	0.642	0.674	0.816	0.480
474	Pedras Altas	0.640	0.647	0.820	0.493
475	Ibirapuitã	0.638	0.678	0.828	0.463
475	Vicente Dutra	0.638	0.656	0.809	0.489
477	Capão Bonito do Sul	0.637	0.654	0.779	0.507
477	Capão do Leão	0.637	0.662	0.814	0.480
479	Gramado Xavier	0.634	0.681	0.792	0.473
480	Santana da Boa Vista	0.633	0.630	0.802	0.503
481	Jari	0.631	0.636	0.836	0.473
481	Redentora	0.631	0.606	0.792	0.523
481	Sinimbu	0.631	0.697	0.792	0.456
484	Turuçu	0.629	0.685	0.814	0.446
485	Amaral Ferrador	0.624	0.664	0.802	0.457
485	Vale do Sol	0.624	0.681	0.813	0.439
487	São José do Norte	0.623	0.663	0.792	0.461
488	Passa Sete	0.622	0.639	0.782	0.482
489	Charrua	0.620	0.699	0.885	0.385
490	Benjamin Constant do Sul	0.619	0.601	0.801	0.492
491	Herveiras	0.616	0.670	0.792	0.441
491	Chuvisca	0.616	0.655	0.818	0.437
493	Jaquirana	0.614	0.626	0.779	0.475
494	Lajeado do Bugre	0.613	0.604	0.822	0.465
495	Barão do Triunfo	0.610	0.645	0.821	0.428
496	Dom Feliciano	0.587	0.633	0.818	0.390
Low HDI
no municipality
No data
Pinto Bandeira

== See also ==
- Geography of Brazil
- List of cities in Brazil
