= Espumoso =

Municipality in Rio Grande do Sul, Brazil

Coordinates: 28°44′S 52°51′W

- Municipality
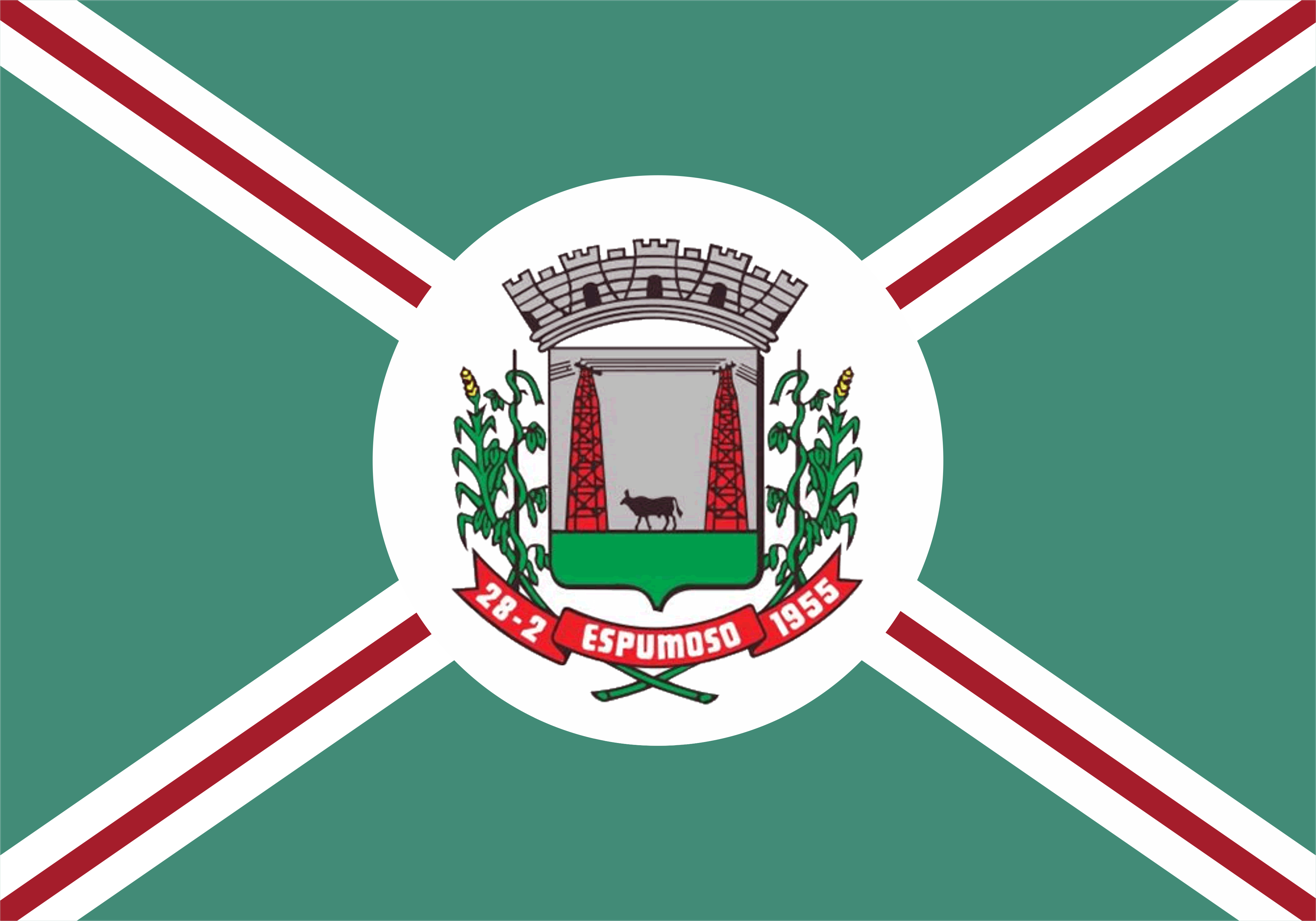
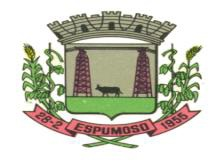
- Flag Coat of arms

- Location of Espumoso in Rio Grande do Sul
- Country: Brazil
- Region: South
- State: Rio Grande do Sul
- Mesoregion: Noroeste Rio-Grandense
- Microregion: Cruz Alta
- Founded: 28 February 1955

Government
  - Mayor: Douglas Fontana (PDT, 2021 - 2024)

Area
  - Total: 783.642 km^{2} (302.566 sq mi)

Population (2021)
  - Total: 15,594
  - Density: 19.899/km^{2} (51.539/sq mi)
- Demonym: Espumosense
- Time zone: UTC−3 (BRT)
- Website: Official website

Espumoso is a municipality in the state of Rio Grande do Sul, Brazil. It belongs to the mesoregion "Nordeste Rio Grandense" and the microregion of "Cruz Alta" along with other 13 municipalities: Alto Alegre, Boa Vista do Cadeado, Boa Vista do Incra, Campos Borges, Cruz Alta, Fortaleza dos Valos, Ibirubá, Jacuizinho, Joia, Quinze de Novembro, Saldanha Marinho, Salto do Jacuí and Santa Bárbara do Sul. The estimated population in 2020 was 15,591 inhabitants, and its total area was 783.065 km^{2}.

In October 2016, Brazilian people voted in order to choose mayors and aldermen. In Espumoso, Douglas Fontana (PDT) was elected mayor with 42.28% of the valid votes. The municipal assembly members elected were: Joacir Carmo Sonda (PDT), Zé Carlos (PDT), Marcel Rotta Simon (PDT), Ana Mari Vogel (PP), Leo Gugel (PDT), Jadir José de Oliveira (PP), João Valério Mocelin (PSDB), Juliano de Oliveira Fiuza (PMDB), and Roberto Iopp (PT). The municipal political scene has been occupied by two political parties along the recent history, PP and PDT, even though there have been other minor political forces in the city.

== See also ==
- List of municipalities in Rio Grande do Sul
