= Microregion of Santo Ângelo =

Coordinates: 28°17′56″S 54°15′46″W

Santo Ângelo
- Micro-region
- Country: Brazil
- State: Rio Grande do Sul
- Mesoregion: Noroeste Rio-Grandense
- Municipalities: 16

Area
  - Total: 10,751 km^{2} (4,151 sq mi)

The Santo Ângelo micro-region (Microrregião de Santo Ângelo) is a micro-region in the western part of the state of Rio Grande do Sul, Brazil. The area is 10,750.721 km^{2}.

== Municipalities ==
The microregion consists of the following municipalities:

- Bossoroca
- Catuípe
- Dezesseis de Novembro
- Entre-Ijuís
- Eugênio de Castro
- Giruá
- Pirapó
- Rolador
- Santo Ângelo
- Santo Antônio das Missões
- São Luiz Gonzaga
- São Miguel das Missões
- São Nicolau
- Senador Salgado Filho
- Ubiretama
- Vitória das Missões
