= Roque Gonzales, Rio Grande do Sul =

Municipality of Rio Grande do Sul, Brazil

Roque Gonzales
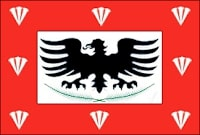
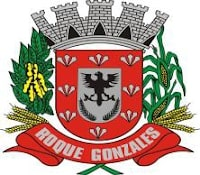
- Flag Coat of arms

- Location in Rio Grande do Sul

- Location in Brazil
- Coordinates: 28°07′S 55°02′W
- Country: Brazil
- State: Rio Grande do Sul
- Mesoregion: Noroeste Rio-Grandense
- Microregion: Microregion of Cerro Largo

Population (2020)
  - Total: 6,797

Roque Gonzales is a municipality located in the northwestern region of the southernmost state of Rio Grande do Sul, Brazil, east of the Uruguay River and the Argentinian border. Roque Gonzales was named after the jesuit missionary and saint Roque González de Santa Cruz.

The municipality would be partially flooded by the proposed Garabí Dam.

== Neighboring municipalities ==
- Porto Xavier
- São Paulo das Missões
- São Pedro do Butiá
- Rolador
- São Luiz Gonzaga
- Dezesseis de Novembro
- Pirapó

== History ==
Primarily German-Brazilians or Deutschbrasilianer from the old colonized areas of the state of Rio Grande do Sul settled Roque Gonzales. The original German settlements whence they came were often referred to as Altkolonie because they are located on the eastern part of the state where Germans first put down roots, starting in 1824 (i.e. Estrela, Montenegro, Lajeado, etc.).

East Pomeranian has been spoken in Esquina Emanuel since the early days of its foundation because it was settled by immigrants of Pomeranian descent. Dona Otília was settled primarily by Lutherans. Typically most of the German speakers in the municipality and in the wider region spoke Riograndenser Hunsrückisch and identified with the Roman Catholic tradition and customs. In 2012 the state chamber of deputies voted unanimously in favor of recognizing this Germanic dialect an official historical culture good to be preserved.

Roque Gonzales is located near the margins of the Rio Ijuí. Not too far south from the town the river turns into a wide waterfall: Salto Pirapó. Camping is available in the area. It is a great place for bird watching, hiking a relaxation. This is also the location of a small hydroelectric plant built almost one hundred years ago and a fixture in local history. Two new hydroelectric plants have been built on the Ijuí river within the general region.

== See also ==
- Sepé Tiaraju
- São Miguel das Missões
- Jesuits
- Guarani people
- List of municipalities in Rio Grande do Sul
