= São Nicolau, Rio Grande do Sul =

Municipality of Rio Grande do Sul, Brazil

São Nicolau
- Municipality
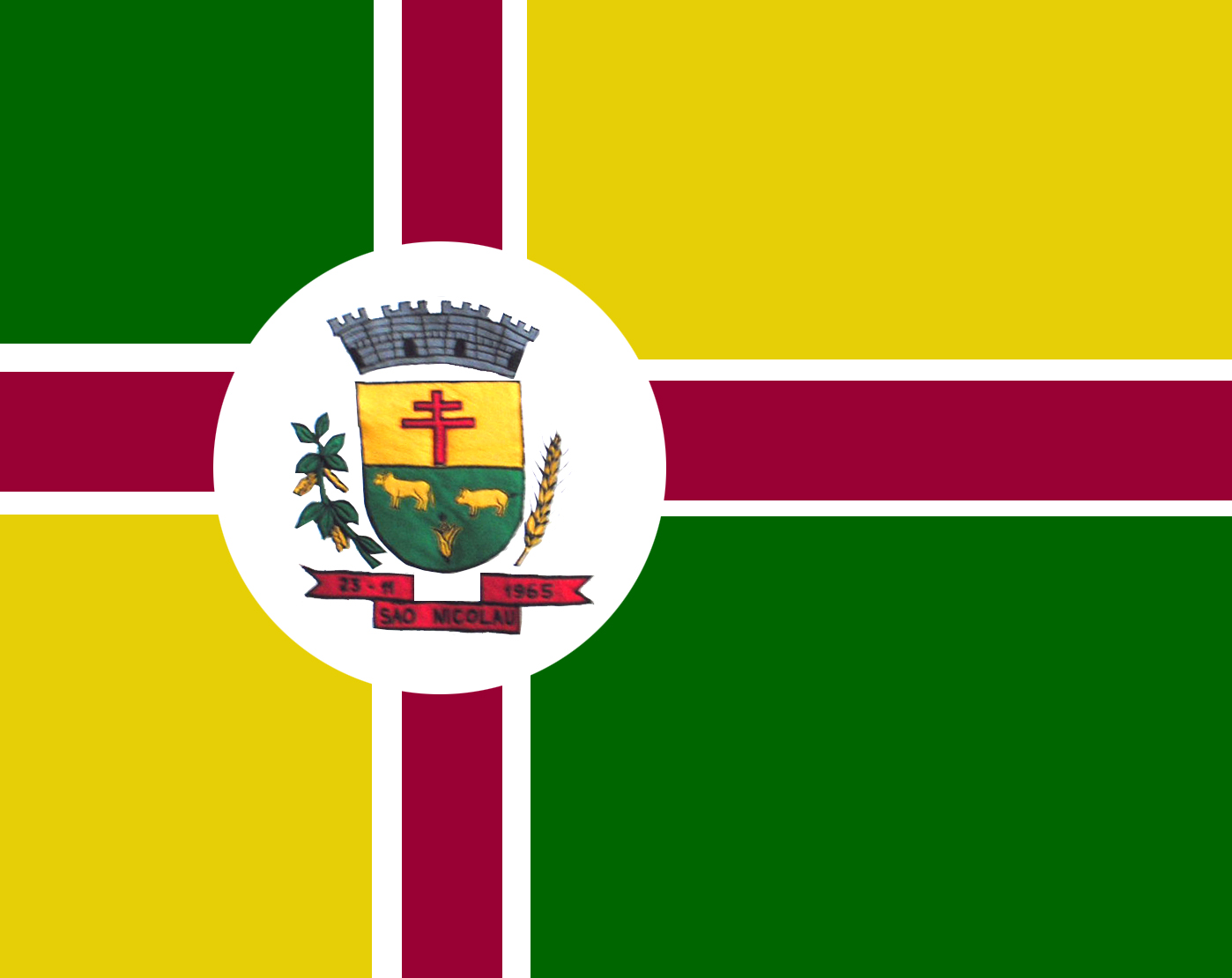
- Flag Coat of arms

- Location in Rio Grande do Sul state

- Location in Brazil
- Coordinates: 28°10′58″S 55°16′1″W
- Country: Brazil
- State: Rio Grande do Sul
- Micro-region: Santo Ângelo

Area
  - Total: 485.32 km^{2} (187.38 sq mi)

Population (2020)
  - Total: 5,208
  - Density: 10.73/km^{2} (27.79/sq mi)
- Time zone: UTC−3 (BRT)
- Website: www.saonicolau.rs.gov.br

São Nicolau (Portuguese meaning Saint Nicholas) is a municipality of the state of Rio Grande do Sul, Brazil. It was founded in 1626 by Jesuit priest Roque González y de Santa Cruz. The population is 5,208 (2020 est.) in an area of 485.32 km^{2} (187.38 sq mi). It is located 562 km west of the state capital of Porto Alegre, northeast of Alegrete. The Uruguay River, which forms the border with Argentina, flows along the northwestern part of the municipality.

The municipality would be partially flooded by the proposed Garabí Dam.

== Bounding municipalities ==
- Pirapó
- Dezesseis de Novembro
- São Luiz Gonzaga
- Santo Antônio das Missões
- Garruchos

== See also ==
- List of municipalities in Rio Grande do Sul
