= Rio Grande do Sul floods =

Rio Grande do Sul floods may refer to:

- 2023 Rio Grande do Sul floods
- 2024 Rio Grande do Sul floods
