= Santo Antônio das Missões =

Municipality of Rio Grande do Sul, Brazil

- Municipality
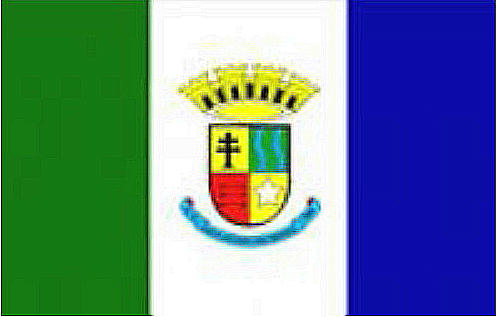
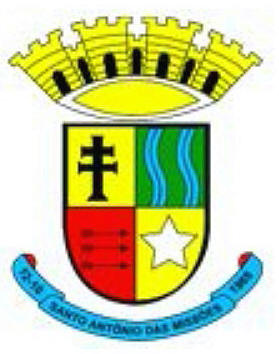
- Flag Coat of arms

- Location in Rio Grande do Sul state

- Location in Brazil
- Coordinates: 28°30′39″S 55°13′40″W
- Country: Brazil
- State: Rio Grande do Sul
- Micro-region: Santo Ângelo

Area
  - Total: 1,710.87 km^{2} (660.57 sq mi)

Population (2020)
  - Total: 10,050
  - Density: 5.874/km^{2} (15.21/sq mi)
- Time zone: UTC−3 (BRT)

Santo Antônio das Missões (Portuguese meaning "Saint Anthony of the missions") is a municipality in the western part of the state of Rio Grande do Sul, Brazil. The population is 10,050 (2020 est.) in an area of 1710.87 km^{2}. Distance from the state capital of Porto Alegre is 534 km west and tens of kilometres east from the Argentine border but the municipality does not border since it is close.

The municipality would be partially flooded by the proposed Garabí Dam.

== Bounding municipalities ==
- São Nicolau
- São Luiz Gonzaga
- Bossoroca
- Itacurubi
- São Borja
- Garruchos

== See also ==
- List of municipalities in Rio Grande do Sul
