= Bossoroca =

Municipality of Rio Grande do Sul, Brazil

- Municipality
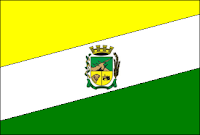
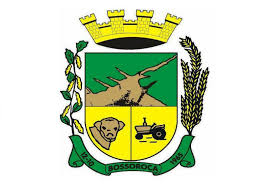
- Flag Coat of arms

- Location in Rio Grande do Sul state

- Location in Brazil
- Coordinates: 28°43′48″S 54°54′0″W
- Country: Brazil
- State: Rio Grande do Sul
- Micro-region: Santo Ângelo

Area
  - Total: 1,610.57 km^{2} (621.84 sq mi)

Population (2020)
  - Total: 6,205
  - Density: 3.853/km^{2} (9.978/sq mi)
- Time zone: UTC−3 (BRT)
- Postal code: 97850-xxx
- Website: www.bossoroca.rs.gov.br

Bossoroca is a municipality of the western part of the state of Rio Grande do Sul, Brazil. The population is 6,205 (2020 est.) in an area of 1610.57 km^{2}. The name comes from the Guarani language, and may mean erosion. It is located 524 km west of the state capital of Porto Alegre, northeast of Alegrete.

== Bounding municipalities ==
- São Luiz Gonzaga
- São Miguel das Missões
- Capão do Cipó
- Santiago
- Itacurubi
- Santo Antônio das Missões

== History ==
The area was first inhabited by the Guarani tribes. In the 17th and 18th centuries, Jesuit missions were established in the area. The municipality of Bossoroca was created on March 4, 1967.

== See also ==
- List of municipalities in Rio Grande do Sul
