= Ponte Preta =

Ponte Preta can refer to:

- Ponte Preta, Rio Grande do Sul, Brazilian municipality
- Associação Atlética Ponte Preta, Brazilian football team
  - Arena Ponte Preta
- Ponte Preta Sumaré Futebol Clube, Brazilian football team
