= Vergueiro =

Vergueiro may refer to:

- Maria Alice Vergueiro (1935–2020), Brazilian actress
- Vergueiro, an underground station in São Paulo, Brazil
- Mauser-Vergueiro, Portuguese bolt-action rifle
- Nicolau Vergueiro, municipality in Rio Grande do Sul, Brazil
