= 2023 Rio Grande do Sul floods =

Natural disaster in Brazil in September 2023

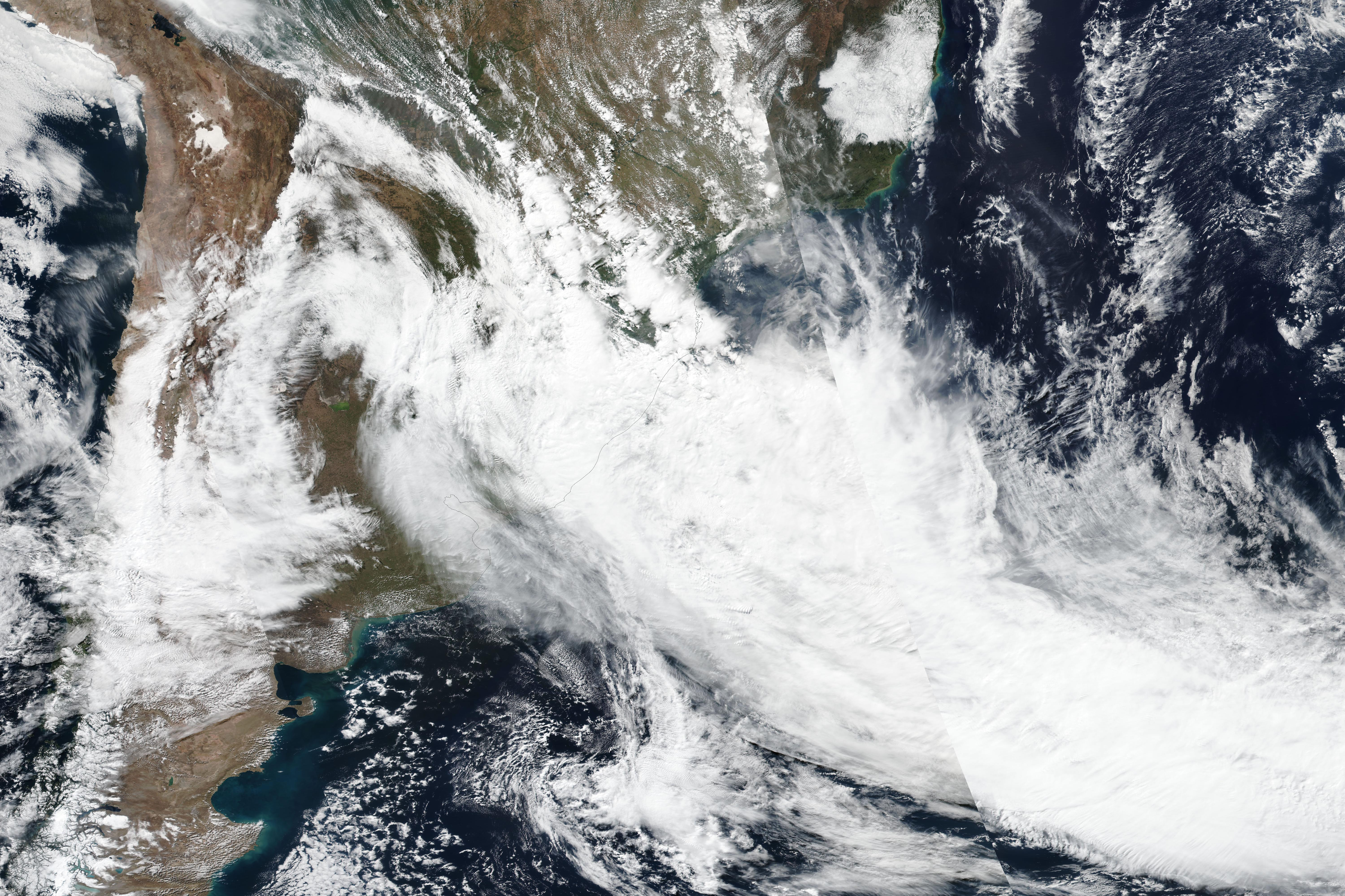
- Extratropical cyclone off the coast of Brazil on September 4, 2023
- Cause: Heavy rain and strong wind

Meteorological history
- Date: September 2023

Flood
- Max. rainfall: 291 mm (11.5 in) in Passo Fundo

Overall effects
- Fatalities: 47
- Injuries: 940
- Missing: 46
- Damage: $1.3 million
- Areas affected: Rio Grande do Sul, Brazil

In September 2023, heavy rainfall and strong winds from an extratropical cyclone resulted in the deaths of at least 47 people in Rio Grande do Sul state of Brazil, injuries to 940 people, and $1.3 million in damage. Flooding also impacted several municipalities in Rio Grande do Sul, including Bento Gonçalves, Caxias do Sul, Ibiraiaras, Lajeado do Bugre, Nova Bassano, Santo Expedito do Sul, and São Jorge. The floods also prompted declaration of a state of emergency in the state by governor Eduardo Leite.

== Background ==
The flooding was caused by the warming atmosphere resulting from climate change, which increases the likelihood of extreme rainfall. Global temperatures have risen by approximately 1.2 degrees Celsius since the onset of the industrial era.

In 2022, torrential rain led to landslides and mudflows near the city of Recife in the country's northeast, resulting in the deaths of at least 100 people. That same year, floods in Petropolis, Rio de Janeiro, killed 231 people and caused 1 billion R$ ($193.8 million USD) in damage. In February 2023, flooding and landslides in Brazil's São Paulo state killed 40 people as 627 millimetres (24.7 in) of rain fell in São Sebastião.

== Impact ==
Within a span of 72 hours, over 200mm (11 inches) of rainfall deluged the state from an extratropical cyclone, resulting in floods and landslides. The heaviest rainfall in the 72-hour period was in Passo Fundo, receiving 291 millimetres (11.5 in). Officials reported that thousands of individuals were compelled to evacuate their residences. In Muçum, local media sources indicated that hundreds were rescued from their rooftops as 85% of the town became inundated and 16 deaths occurred. The floods affected more than 354,711 people, with 940 injuries, 46 missing, 25,855 of them displaced and an additional 3,800 homeless.

== Response ==
Rescue teams employed helicopters to access regions isolated by floodwaters. The governor of Rio Grande do Sul, Eduardo Leite, declared a state of emergency as he assessed damage across the state.
