= Jacuizinho =

Municipality of Rio Grande do Sul, Brazil

- Municipality
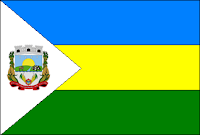
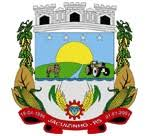
- Flag Coat of arms

- Location in Brazil
- Coordinates: 29°2′2″S 53°3′32″W
- Country: Brazil
- Region: Southern
- State: Rio Grande do Sul
- Mesoregion: Noroeste Rio-Grandense

Population (2020)
  - Total: 2,706
- Time zone: UTC−3 (BRT)

Jacuizinho is a municipality in the state of Rio Grande do Sul in the Southern Region of Brazil. It was raised to municipality status in 1997, the area being taken out of the municipalities of Salto do Jacuí and Espumoso.

Its estimated population in 2020 was 2,706 inhabitants.

== See also ==
- List of municipalities in Rio Grande do Sul
