= Garabí Dam =

Planned dam in Brazil and Argentina

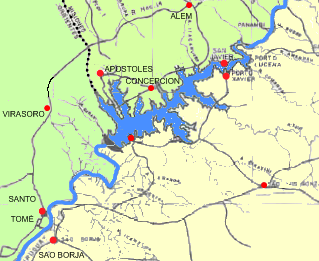
- 2007 projection of the Garabí Dam and reservoir

- Location within Brazil
- Official name: Represa de Garabí
- Country: Argentina, Brazil
- Coordinates: 28.227032°S 55.716181°W
- Purpose: Hydroelectric
- Status: Planned

Dam and spillways
- Type of dam: Earth fill
- Length: 3,200 metres (10,500 ft)
- Elevation at crest: 93 metres (305 ft)
- Width (crest): 10 metres (33 ft)

Reservoir
- Surface area: 642 square kilometres (248 sq mi)
- Normal elevation: 89 metres (292 ft)

Power Station
- Hydraulic head: 33 metres (108 ft)
- Turbines: 8 Kaplan
- Installed capacity: 1,152MW
- Capacity factor: 0.60
- Annual generation: 5,970GW

The Garabí Dam (Portuguese: Represa de Garabí), is a planned dam and generating station on the Uruguay River between Argentina and Brazil. Part of the Garabí-Panambi Hydroelectric Complex. There is some controversy over the environmental impact on the fast-flowing river. As of March 2026, the dam is still in planning stages, due to legal challenges and local opposition.

== Location ==
The dam would be built in the Corrientes provinces of Argentina and the Garruchos municipality of Rio Grande do Sul in Brazil. The exact location would depend on the results of geological studies of the sites.The Garabí Dam would be about 6 kilometres (3.7 mi) downstream from the town of Garruchos, and in Brazil its reservoir would cover parts of the municipalities of Garruchos, Santo Antônio das Missões, São Nicolau, Pirapó, Roque Gonzales, Porto Vera Cruz, Porto Lucena and Porto Xavier.The project is a joint venture of Eletrobras of Brazil and Emprendimientos Energéticos Binacionales (Ebisa) of Argentina.

== Technical ==
In 1988 the proposed dam would have a reservoir at an altitude of 94 metres (308 ft) above sea level, two engine houses with 6 Kaplan turbines each giving a total installed capacity of 1,400 to 1,800MW with an annual average of 6,100GWh.The dam would have a maximum height from the foundation of 81 metres (266 ft) and a length of about 3,800 metres (12,500 ft). The two machine houses would share a common tunnel in the river bed. The reservoir would be 145 kilometres (90 mi) long, with an area of 810 square kilometres (310 sq mi). As of March 1986 the estimated cost was US$1,357 million and by December 1994 the estimate had been revised to US$1,789 million.

Under a revised plan in 2010 the proposed dam would have an altitude of 89 metres (292 ft) above sea level, one engine house with 8 Kaplan turbines, giving an installed capacity of 1,152MW, with an annual average of 5,970GWh.The dam would be about 40 metres (130 ft) high and 3,200 metres (10,500 ft) long.As of 2016 the estimated cost was US$2,728 million.

== Planning and approval process ==
Proposed hydroelectric exploitation of the Uruguay River has a long history.In a convention between Argentina and Brazil signed on 14 March 1972, three sites were selected: Roncador, or Panambí, with 2,700MW, Garabi with 1,800MW and San Pedro with 1,700MW. Arguments in favor of the projects were that they would support development of the local and regional economies, help make the two countries independent of external energy suppliers using a renewable resource and would avoid using hard currency resources.In 2003 the Garabí Dam which would flood 300 square kilometres (120 sq mi) in southern Misiones, was still on hold as was the Roncador/Panambí dam.

Brazil and Argentina signed an agreement in 2005 for two possible dams, the Garabí Dam with 1,150MW and the Panambí Dam with 1,050MW. Eletrobras and EBISA were to undertake the project expected to be completed by 2013, although it had met some local opposition.In November 2007 the Brazilian head of state Luiz Inácio Lula da Silva and his Argentinian counterpart Cristina Fernández de Kirchner agreed to prioritize construction of the Garabí binational dam.The next day, the planning ministers of Brazil and Argentina endorsed these agreements on exchange of energy. The governments of Corrientes and Rio Grande do Sul wanted to implement the Garabí Binational Project as quickly as possible.

A cooperation agreement was signed in Rio de Janeiro on 1 September 2008 between Emprendimientos Energéticos Binacionales S.A. (EBISA) and Centrais Elétricas Brasileiras S.A. (ELETROBRAS). The hydroelectric inventory study was concluded in 2010, recommending the Garabí have 1,152 MW with a 642 square kilometres (248 sq mi) reservoir. The environmental and engineering studies and social communications plan were started in May 2013 as well as the technical bidding documents.In February 2014 the Brazilian Institute of Environment and Renewable Natural Resources (IBAMA) approved the terms of reference for rescuing the fauna. The survey was to start in April 2014. However, in 2015, Argentine locals who opposed the construction of the dam (and the complex in general) submitted a bill called "proyecto de Ley por los Ríos Libres" (Bill for Free-Flowing Rivers) to the provincial legislature. The bill was formally introduced in 2019, posing an immense legal challenge for the future of the project and effectively halting it for the time being. In addition, Brazilian courts in 2015 suspended licenses because they project would flood approximately 60 hectares of Turvo State Park, stating that it was illegal and violated environmental legislation.

== Sources ==
- "Argentina y Brasil ratifican acuerdos por Garabí", Mo Mirandu (in Spanish), 20 November 2007
- "Brasil y Argentina acordaron priorizar la concreción de la represa Garabí", El Territorio (in Spanish), 21 November 2007
- Caubet, Christian G. (1995-01-01), "Grands Barrages Internationaux: Aspects du Droit de la Cooperation dans le Bassin de la Plata", Barrages internationaux et coopération (in French), KARTHALA Editions, ISBN 978-2-86537-587-5
- Cigana, Caio (29 March 2014), "Ambientalistas cerram fileiras contrárias aos novos aproveitamentos hidrelétricos do Rio Uruguai", Zero Hora (in Portuguese), Grupo RBS
- Construcción de Planta Hidroeléctrica de Garabí (in Spanish), IIRSA
- Eletrobras apresenta Garabi-Panambi a prefeitos (in Portuguese), Eletrobras CGTEE, 7 April 2014
- Enerdata (2011), Brazilian Energy Report, Enerdata, GGKEY:XK288JCZUJF
- Leal, Carlos Galindo; Câmara, Ibsen de Gusmão (2003), The Atlantic Forest of South America: Biodiversity Status, Threats, and Outlook, Island Press, ISBN 978-1-55963-989-7
- Wiegers, Mario A. (1996-01-01), Integración energética en el Cono Sur (in Portuguese), BID-INTAL, ISBN 978-950-738-053-2
