= Rolador =

Municipality of Rio Grande do Sul, Brazil

- Municipality
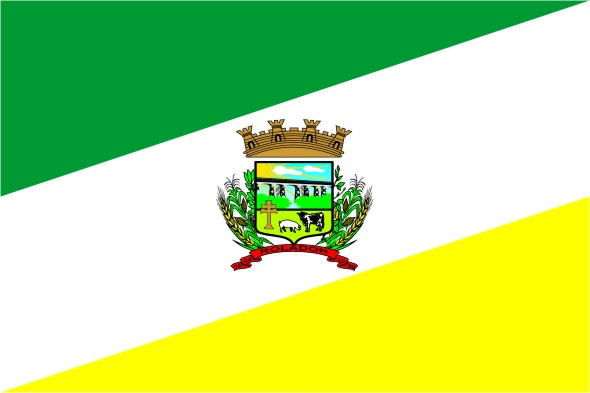
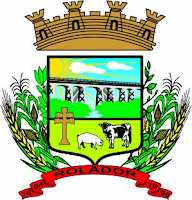
- Flag Coat of arms

- Location in Rio Grande do Sul state

- Location in Brazil
- Coordinates: 28°15′28″S 54°49′4″W
- Country: Brazil
- State: Rio Grande do Sul
- Micro-region: Santo Ângelo

Area
  - Total: 295.01 km^{2} (113.90 sq mi)

Population (2020)
  - Total: 2,296
  - Density: 7.783/km^{2} (20.16/sq mi)
- Time zone: UTC−3 (BRT)
- Website: www.rolador.rs.gov.br

Rolador is a municipality of the state of Rio Grande do Sul, Brazil. The population is 2,296 (2020 est.) in an area of 295.01 km^{2}. It is located 524 km west of the state capital of Porto Alegre, northeast of Alegrete.

== Bounding municipalities ==
- São Pedro do Butiá
- Salvador das Missões
- Cerro Largo
- Mato Queimado
- Caibaté
- São Luiz Gonzaga
- Roque Gonzales

== See also ==
- List of municipalities in Rio Grande do Sul
