= São Luiz Gonzaga =

Municipality of Rio Grande do Sul, Brazil

- Municipality
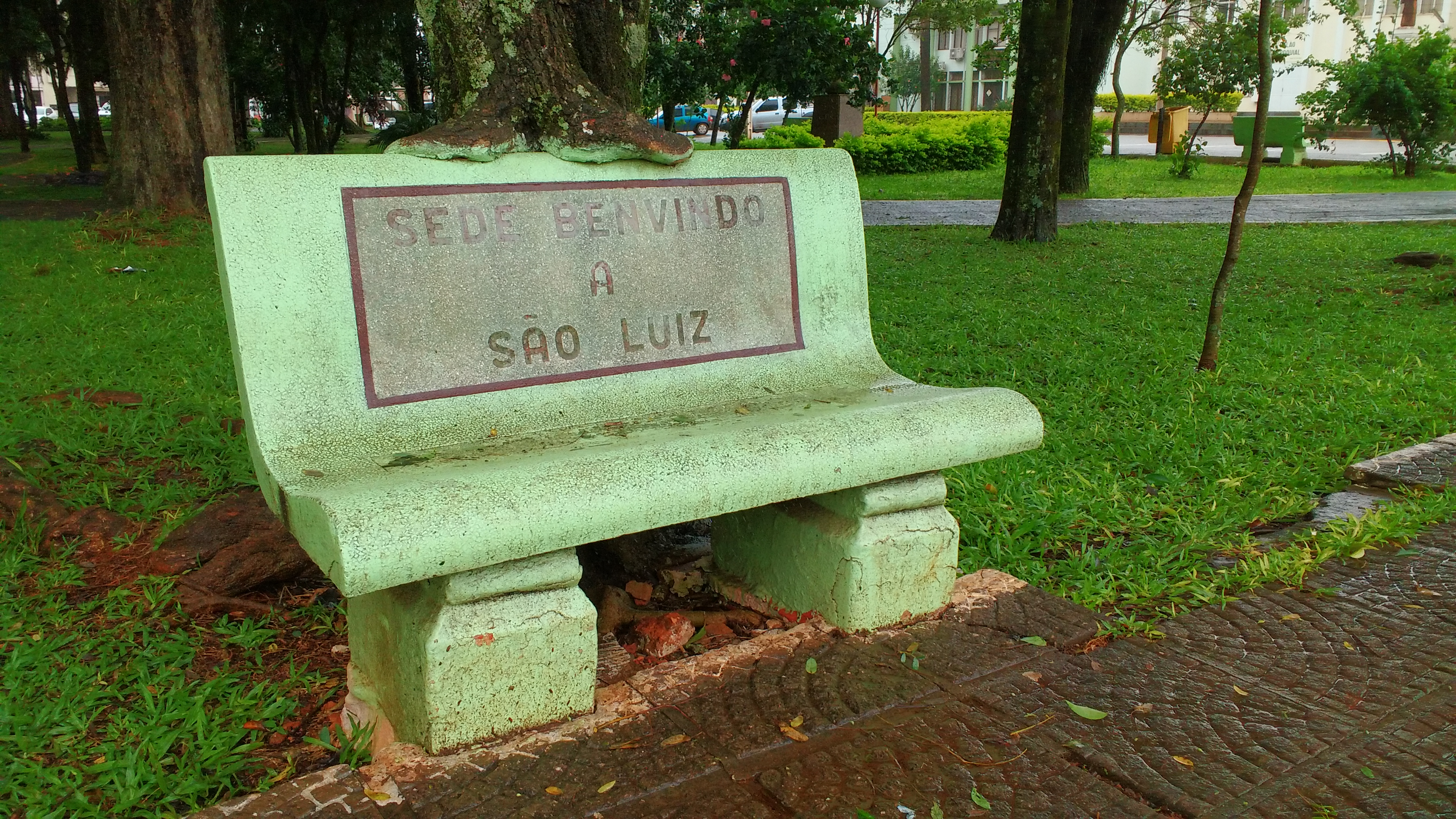

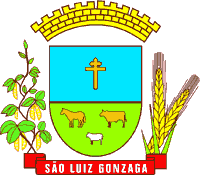
- Flag Coat of arms

- Location in Rio Grande do Sul state

- Location in Brazil
- Coordinates: 28°24′28″S 54°57′39″W
- Country: Brazil
- State: Rio Grande do Sul
- Micro-region: Santo Ângelo

Area
  - Total: 1,295.68 km^{2} (500.26 sq mi)

Population (2020)
  - Total: 33,293
  - Density: 25.695/km^{2} (66.551/sq mi)
- Time zone: UTC−3 (BRT)

São Luiz Gonzaga (Portuguese for St. Aloysius Gonzaga) is a municipality of the state of Rio Grande do Sul, Brazil. Its population is 33,293 (2020 est.) in an area of 1295.68 km^{2}. It was founded in the 17th century as a Jesuit mission town. It is located 503 km west of the state capital of Porto Alegre, northeast of Alegrete.

== Geography ==
=== Climate ===
São Luiz Gonzaga has a humid subtropical climate (Köppen: Cfa) with hot summers, mild winters, and ample rainfall throughout the year.

Climate data for São Luiz Gonzaga (1991–2020)
Month	Jan	Feb	Mar	Apr	May	Jun	Jul	Aug	Sep	Oct	Nov	Dec	Year
Mean daily maximum °C (°F)	32.7 (90.9)	31.9 (89.4)	30.5 (86.9)	27.6 (81.7)	23.1 (73.6)	21.1 (70.0)	20.7 (69.3)	23.3 (73.9)	24.6 (76.3)	27.4 (81.3)	30.1 (86.2)	32.1 (89.8)	27.1 (80.8)
Daily mean °C (°F)	26.0 (78.8)	25.2 (77.4)	23.8 (74.8)	21.1 (70.0)	17.3 (63.1)	15.6 (60.1)	14.9 (58.8)	16.9 (62.4)	18.2 (64.8)	21.0 (69.8)	23.3 (73.9)	25.4 (77.7)	20.7 (69.3)
Mean daily minimum °C (°F)	20.6 (69.1)	20.1 (68.2)	18.8 (65.8)	16.4 (61.5)	13.3 (55.9)	11.8 (53.2)	10.8 (51.4)	12.2 (54.0)	13.3 (55.9)	15.9 (60.6)	17.4 (63.3)	19.7 (67.5)	15.9 (60.6)
Average precipitation mm (inches)	170.6 (6.72)	158.4 (6.24)	156.4 (6.16)	194.3 (7.65)	168.6 (6.64)	132.7 (5.22)	124.1 (4.89)	104.6 (4.12)	146.6 (5.77)	264.4 (10.41)	169.7 (6.68)	199.0 (7.83)	1,989.4 (78.32)
Average precipitation days (≥ 1.0 mm)	8.5	8.3	7.7	8.0	8.4	7.8	8.0	6.9	8.1	11.0	7.6	8.6	98.9
Average relative humidity (%)	68.0	71.2	72.5	73.3	76.7	77.9	75.1	70.2	70.6	71.0	64.1	64.6	71.3
Average dew point °C (°F)	20.3 (68.5)	20.4 (68.7)	19.3 (66.7)	16.8 (62.2)	13.8 (56.8)	12.3 (54.1)	10.9 (51.6)	11.8 (53.2)	13.3 (55.9)	16.1 (61.0)	16.8 (62.2)	18.9 (66.0)	15.9 (60.6)
Mean monthly sunshine hours	220.9	196.4	214.9	185.2	161.3	126.0	153.0	172.1	161.0	176.2	212.7	216.9	2,196.6
Source: NOAA

== Bounding municipalities ==
- Roque Gonzales
- Rolador
- Caibaté
- São Miguel das Missões
- Bossoroca
- Santo Antônio das Missões
- São Nicolau
- Dezesseis de Novembro

== See also ==
- List of municipalities in Rio Grande do Sul
