= Ubiretama =

Municipality of Rio Grande do Sul, Brazil

- Municipality
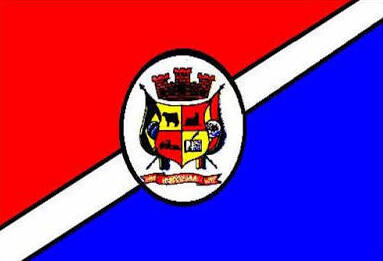
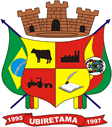
- Flag Coat of arms

- Location in Rio Grande do Sul state

- Location in Brazil
- Coordinates: 28°2′45″S 54°50′51″W
- Country: Brazil
- Region: South Region
- State: Rio Grande do Sul
- Micro-region: Santo Ângelo

Area
  - Total: 126.69 km^{2} (48.92 sq mi)

Population (2020)
  - Total: 1,983
  - Density: 15.65/km^{2} (40.54/sq mi)
- Time zone: UTC−3 (BRT)
- Postal code: 98898-xxx
- Website: www.ubiretama.rs.gov.br

Ubiretama is a municipality of the western part of the state of Rio Grande do Sul, Brazil. The name comes from the Tupi language. It is located 499 km west of the state capital of Porto Alegre, northeast of Alegrete and east of Argentina. The population is 1,983 (2020 est.) in an area of 126.69 km^{2}.

== Bounding municipalities ==
- Santa Rosa
- Senador Salgado Filho
- Guarani das Missões
- Cerro Largo
- Campina das Missões
- Cândido Godói

== See also ==
- List of municipalities in Rio Grande do Sul
