= Senador Salgado Filho =

Municipality of Rio Grande do Sul, Brazil

- Municipality
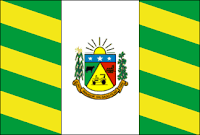
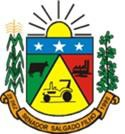
- Flag Coat of arms

- Location in Rio Grande do Sul state

- Location in Brazil
- Coordinates: 28°1′40″S 54°32′37″W
- Country: Brazil
- State: Rio Grande do Sul
- Micro-region: Santo Ângelo

Area
  - Total: 147.21 km^{2} (56.84 sq mi)

Population (2020)
  - Total: 2,770
  - Density: 18.8/km^{2} (48.7/sq mi)
- Time zone: UTC−3 (BRT)
- Website: www.senadorsalgadofilho.rs.gov.br

Senador Salgado Filho is a municipality of the western part of the state of Rio Grande do Sul, Brazil. The population is 2,770 (2020 est.) in an area of 147.21 km^{2}. It is located 492 km west of the state capital of Porto Alegre, northeast of Alegrete and east of Argentina.

== Bounding municipalities ==
- Santa Rosa
- Giruá
- Sete de Setembro
- Guarani das Missões
- Ubiretama

== See also ==
- List of municipalities in Rio Grande do Sul
