= Porto Vera Cruz =

Municipality in Rio Grande do Sul, Brazil

Coordinates: 27°44′09″S 54°54′03″W

- Municipality
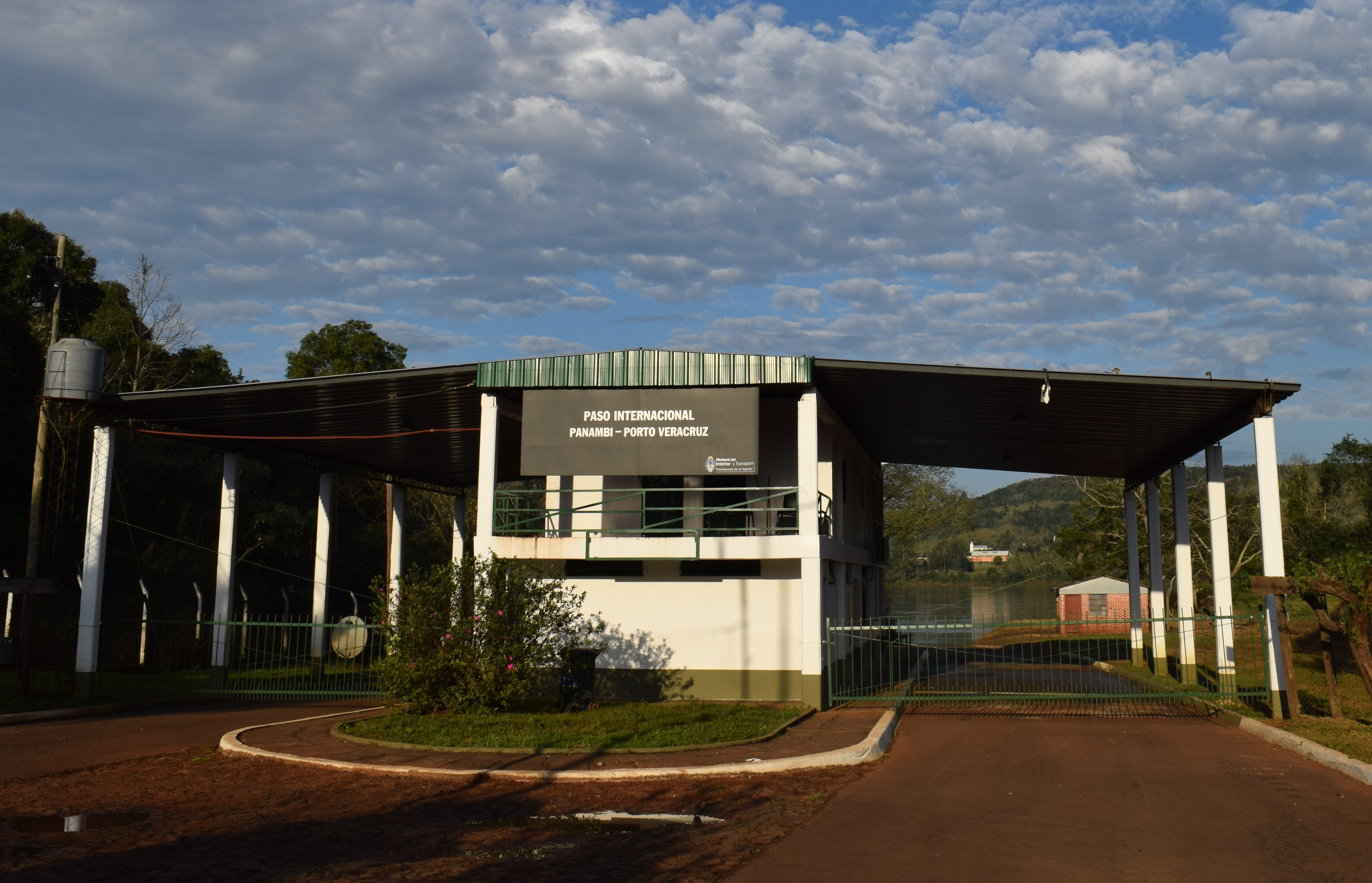
- Border crossing checkpoint between Porto Vera Cruz and Panambí on the Uruguay River

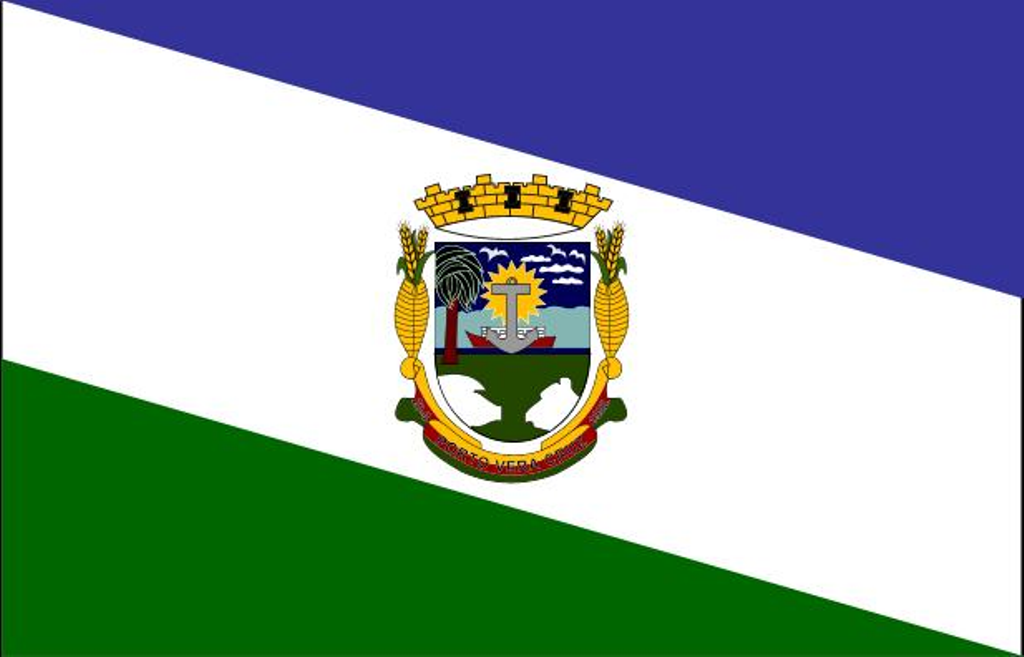
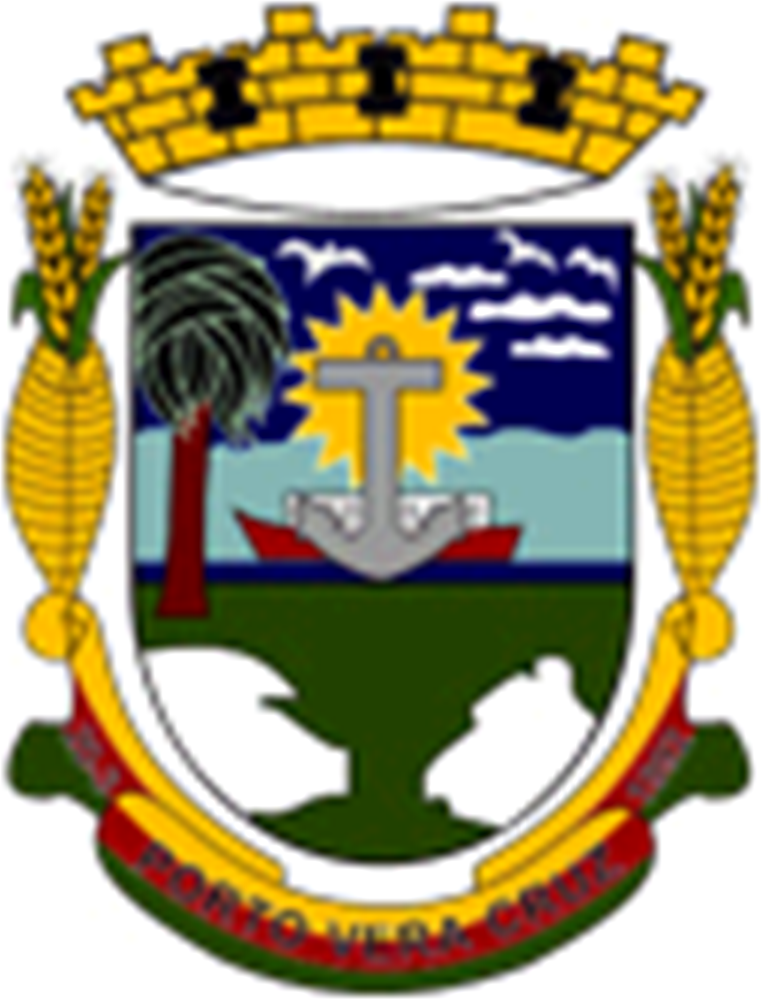
- Flag Coat of arms

- Location of Porto Vera Cruz in Rio Grande do Sul
- Country: Brazil
- Region: South
- State: Rio Grande do Sul
- Mesoregion: Noroeste Rio-Grandense
- Microregion: Santa Rosa
- Founded: 20 March 1992

Government
  - Mayor: José Andrade de Matos (MDB, 2021 - 2024)

Area
  - Total: 114.284 km^{2} (44.125 sq mi)

Population (2021)
  - Total: 1,258
  - Density: 11.01/km^{2} (28.51/sq mi)
- Demonym: Porto-Vera-Cruzense
- Time zone: UTC−3 (BRT)
- Website: Official website

Porto Vera Cruz is a municipality in the state of Rio Grande do Sul, Brazil. As of 2020, the estimated population was 1,308.

The municipality would be partially flooded by the proposed Garabí Dam.

== See also ==
- List of municipalities in Rio Grande do Sul
