= Porto Lucena =

Municipality in Rio Grande do Sul, Brazil

Coordinates: 27°51′S 55°01′W

- Municipality
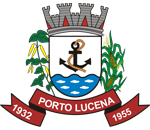
- Coat of arms
- Interactive map of Porto Lucena
- Country: Brazil
- Time zone: UTC−3 (BRT)

Porto Lucena is a municipality in the state of Rio Grande do Sul, Brazil. As of 2020, the estimated population was 4,594.

The municipality would be partially flooded by the proposed Garabí Dam, a planned dam between Brazil and Argentina.

Porto Lucena celebrates its anniversary on August 6 and has a series of events prepared by the local government, including breakfast, book fair, crafts, and family agriculture markets, truco tournament, cycling, and music performances. The local government also donates agricultural equipment to rural associations during the anniversary celebration.

== See also ==
- List of municipalities in Rio Grande do Sul
