= Pirapó =

Municipality of Rio Grande do Sul, Brazil

- Municipality
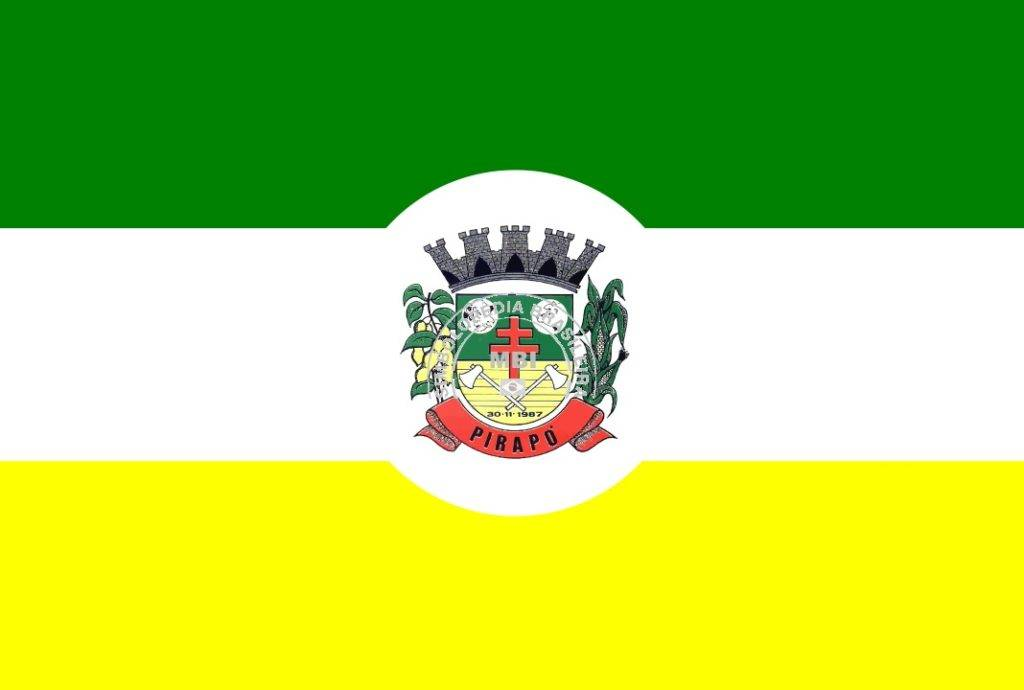
- Flag Coat of arms

- Location in Rio Grande do Sul state

- Location in Brazil
- Coordinates: 28°2′42″S 55°11′56″W
- Country: Brazil
- State: Rio Grande do Sul
- Micro-region: Santo Ângelo

Area
  - Total: 295.01 km^{2} (113.90 sq mi)

Population (2020)
  - Total: 2,254
  - Density: 7.640/km^{2} (19.79/sq mi)
- Time zone: UTC−3 (BRT)
- Website: www.pirapo.rs.gov.br

Pirapó is a municipality of the western part of the state of Rio Grande do Sul, Brazil. The population is 2,254 (2020 est.) in an area of 295.01 km^{2}. The town is situated by the Ijuí River, close to its confluence with the Uruguay River, which forms the border with Argentina. It is located 563 km west of the state capital of Porto Alegre and northeast of Alegrete.

Like many towns in the state which were first settled by German-speaking Europeans, the German language is still present in daily family and community life, if not as much in the public sphere since World War II; the regional German dialect is called Riograndenser Hunsrückisch, as it is a Brazilian variant of the dialect spoken in the Hunsrück region of southwest Germany. In 2012 the state chamber of deputies voted unanimously in favor of recognizing this Germanic dialect an official historical culture good to be preserved.

The municipality would be partially flooded by the proposed Garabí Dam.

== Bounding municipalities ==
- Roque Gonzales
- Dezesseis de Novembro
- São Luiz Gonzaga

== See also ==
- German-Brazilian
- List of municipalities in Rio Grande do Sul
