= Porto Xavier =

Municipality in Rio Grande do Sul, Brazil

Coordinates: 27°54′S 55°08′W

- Municipality
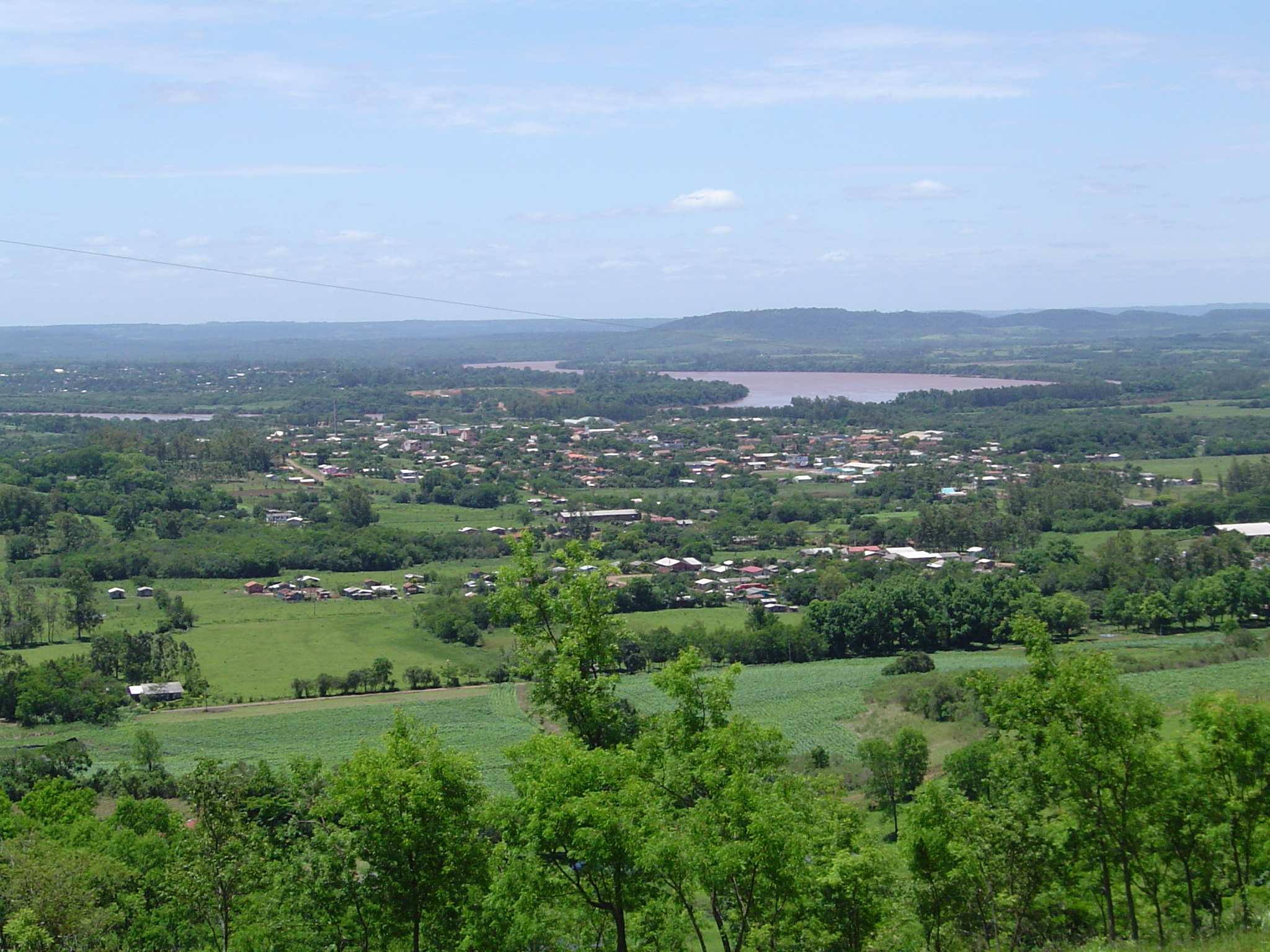

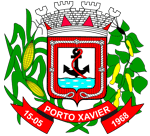
- Flag Coat of arms
- Interactive map of Porto Xavier
- Country: Brazil
- Time zone: UTC−3 (BRT)

Porto Xavier is a municipality in the state of Rio Grande do Sul, Brazil, situated on the Uruguay River, bordering San Javier, Argentina.

The municipality would be partially flooded by the proposed Garabí Dam.

== The origin of the name ==
The name "Porto Xavier" originated from the combination of the term "porto" ("port"), due to its location as a river port on the Uruguay River, with the name of the Jesuit reduction of San Javier, which once stood on the opposite bank of the river, in what is now Argentine territory. The settlement developed from these roots, eventually becoming a municipality with its current name in 1966.

== Geography ==
Porto Xavier covers an area of 281.497 km². It has a population of 9,938 (2022), with a density of 35.3 hab/km².

== See also ==
- List of municipalities in Rio Grande do Sul
