= São Pedro do Butiá =

Municipality in Rio Grande do Sul, Brazil

Coordinates: 28°7′26″S 54°53′13″W

- Municipality
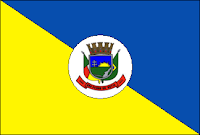
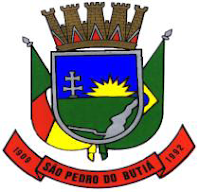
- Flag Coat of arms
- Interactive map of São Pedro do Butiá
- Country: Brazil
- Time zone: UTC−3 (BRT)

São Pedro do Butiá is a municipality in the state of Rio Grande do Sul, Brazil. As of 2020, the estimated population was 2,949.

== Minority language ==
Like many towns in the state which were first settled by German-speaking Brazilians from the Altkolonie or the old colonies in the East, the regional German language is still present in daily family and community life, if not as much in the public sphere since World War II due to language repression public policies implemented by the State (i.e. Getúlio Vargas' aggressive nationalization campaign).

Among other informal names (and often pejorative descriptions), the local dialect is gaining recognition by its formal name, Riograndenser Hunsrückisch (international language code: ISO 639-3 hrx), a reference to the Hunsrück region of southwest Germany, where the language has strong linguistic roots (see: West Middle German dialects).

In 2012 the state chamber of deputies voted unanimously in favor of recognizing this Germanic dialect an official historical intangible culture good to be preserved. Later, in 2014, the National Institute of Historic and Artistic Heritage (IPHAN in Portuguese), under the overview of the Ministry of Culture of Brazil, officially announced of a project of recognition, survey and support to the maintenance of the local language.

== Pioneer park ==
São Pedro do Butiá, also known simplesmente as Butiá in Portuguese or Butioo in German, has a popular pioneer village park called Centro Germânico Missioneiro (here missioneiro is a reference to the old Jesuit Missions, established in the general area during colonial times, around three hundred years before the more modern settlement of the area). The village has many different structures, like a general store, a country school, and some relocated old homes which are all set around a large statue of Saint Peter, the patron saint of this mostly catholic municipality. According to official information, the 30 meters tall statue of St. Peter is the same size as the world-famous statue of Christ the Redeemer, found at the top of the Sugarloaf Mountain in the city of Rio de Janeiro.

== Neo-Gothic architecture ==
The church of São Pedro Apóstolo (St. Peter Apostle) of São Pedro do Butiá is a example of the neo-Gothic architecture which prevailed and characterizes most of the earlier larger religious structures in the Germanic regions in the Northwest of the state.

The main church Paróquia Sagrada Família de Nazaré (Sacred Family of Nazareth Church) is a much larger and a two-towered neo-Gothic construction. Located 15 kilometers away from São Pedro do Butiá, the Igreja Matriz, as it is known, was built between 1913 and 1921 and in the same general revival style.

== See also ==
- List of municipalities in Rio Grande do Sul
- German-Brazilian
