= Ponte Preta, Rio Grande do Sul =

Municipality of Rio Grande do Sul, Brazil

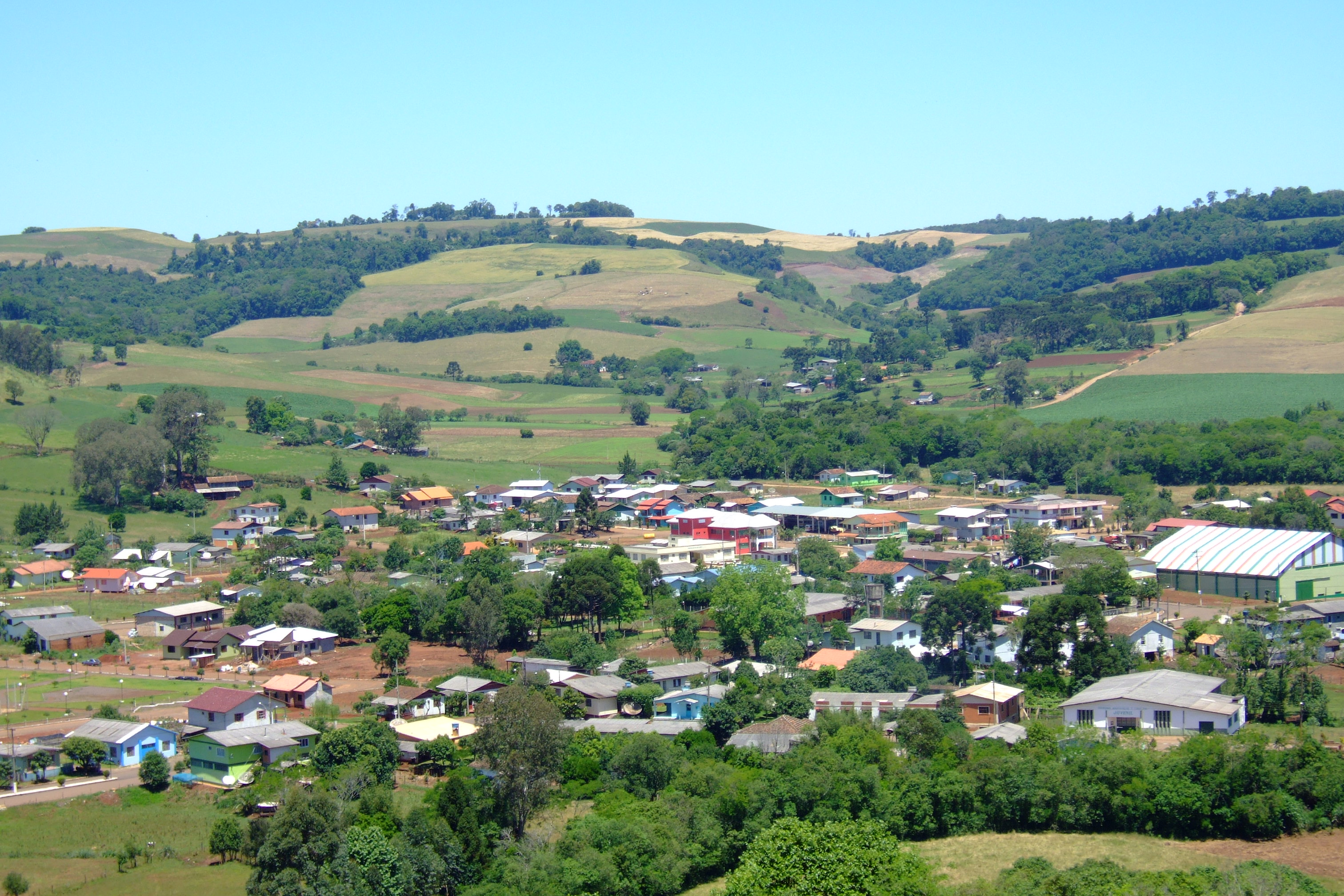
- View of Ponte Preta, Rio Grande do Sul

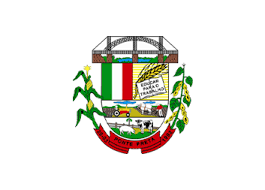
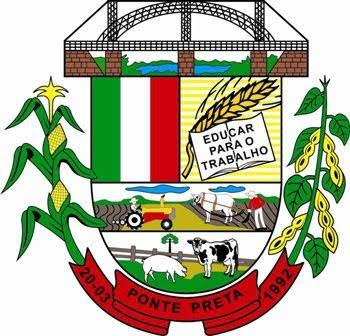
- Flag Coat of arms

- Location of Ponte Preta within Rio Grande do Sul
- Coordinates: 27°39′14″S 52°29′16″W
- Country: Brazil
- State: Rio Grande do Sul
- Mesoregion: Noroeste Rio-Grandense
- Microregion: Microregion of Erechim
- Established: March 20, 1992

Government
  - Mayor: Luis Carlos Parise

Area
  - Total: 100.407 km^{2} (38.767 sq mi)

Population (2020)
  - Total: 1,524
  - Density: 19.6/km^{2} (51/sq mi)
- Time zone: UTC−3 (BRT)
- HDI: 0.782 (UNDP 2000)
- GDP: R$ 20,210,994.00 (IBGE 2003)
- GDP per capita: R$ 10,135.91 (IGBE 2003)

Ponte Preta is a municipality in the state of Rio Grande do Sul, Brazil. In 2020 it had an estimated population of 1,524.

== See also ==
- List of municipalities in Rio Grande do Sul
