= Fortaleza dos Valos =

Municipality in Rio Grande do Sul, Brazil

Coordinates: 28°48′S 53°13′W

- Municipality
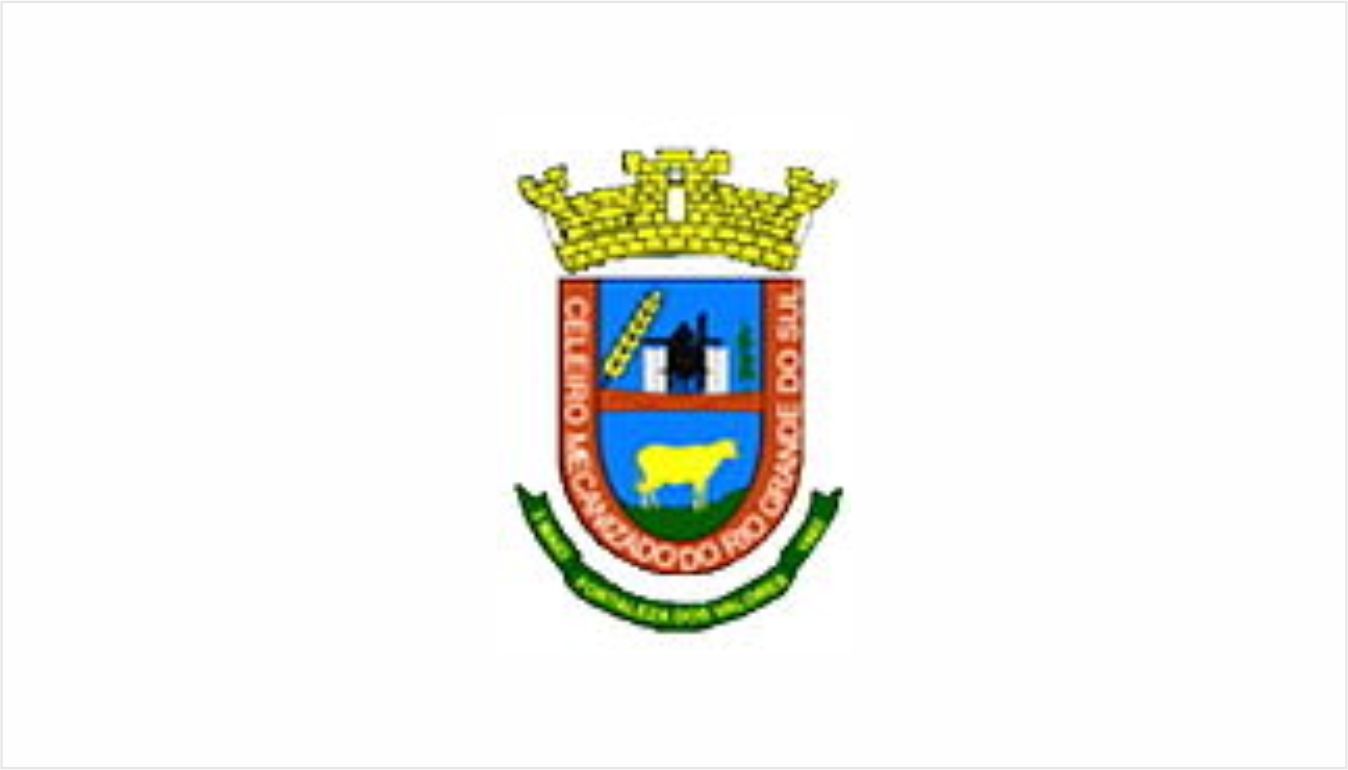
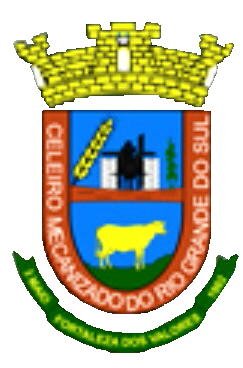
- Flag Coat of arms
- Interactive map of Fortaleza dos Valos
- Country: Brazil
- Time zone: UTC−3 (BRT)

Fortaleza dos Valos is a municipality in the state of Rio Grande do Sul, Brazil. As of 2020, the estimated population was 4,285.

== See also ==
- List of municipalities in Rio Grande do Sul
