= Quinze de Novembro =

Municipality in Rio Grande do Sul, Brazil

Coordinates: 28°44′31″S 53°05′42″W

- Municipality
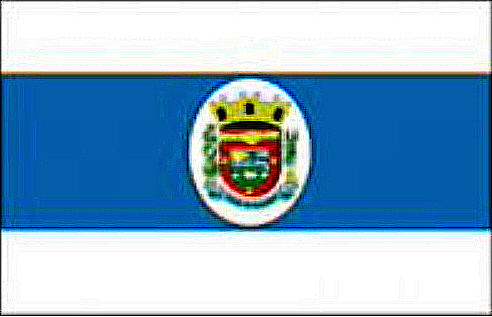
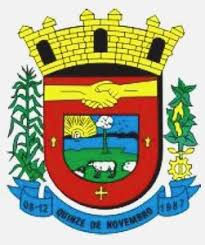
- Flag Coat of arms
- Interactive map of Quinze de Novembro
- Country: Brazil
- Time zone: UTC−3 (BRT)

Quinze de Novembro is a municipality in the state of Rio Grande do Sul, Brazil. As of 2020, the estimated population was 3,803.

== See also ==
- List of municipalities in Rio Grande do Sul
