= Dezesseis de Novembro =

Municipality of Rio Grande do Sul, Brazil

- Municipality
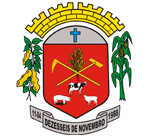
- Flag Coat of arms

- Location in Rio Grande do Sul state

- Location in Brazil
- Coordinates: 28°13′30″S 55°2′56″W
- Country: Brazil
- State: Rio Grande do Sul

Area
  - Total: 216.85 km^{2} (83.73 sq mi)

Population (2020)
  - Total: 2,378
  - Density: 10.97/km^{2} (28.40/sq mi)
- Time zone: UTC−3 (BRT)
- Postal code: 97845-xxx

Dezesseis de Novembro (Portuguese meaning November 16) is a municipality of the western part of the state of Rio Grande do Sul, Brazil. The population is 2,378 (2020 est.) in an area of 216.85 km^{2} (83.73 sq mi). It is 535 kilometres (332 mi) west of the state capital of Porto Alegre, northeast of Alegrete.

It produces the most alfalfa crops in Brazil which earns it the nickname the "Alfalfa Capital of Brazil".

== Bounding municipalities ==
- Roque Gonzales
- São Luiz Gonzaga
- São Nicolau
- Pirapó

== See also ==
- List of municipalities in Rio Grande do Sul
