= Nicolau Vergueiro =

Municipality in Rio Grande do Sul, Brazil

Coordinates: 28°32′09″S 52°27′50″W

- Municipality
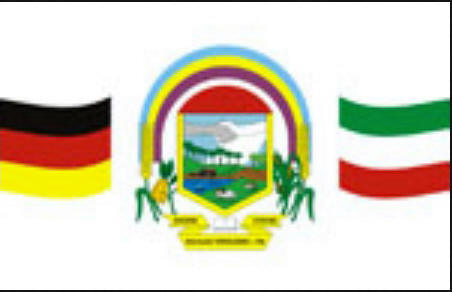
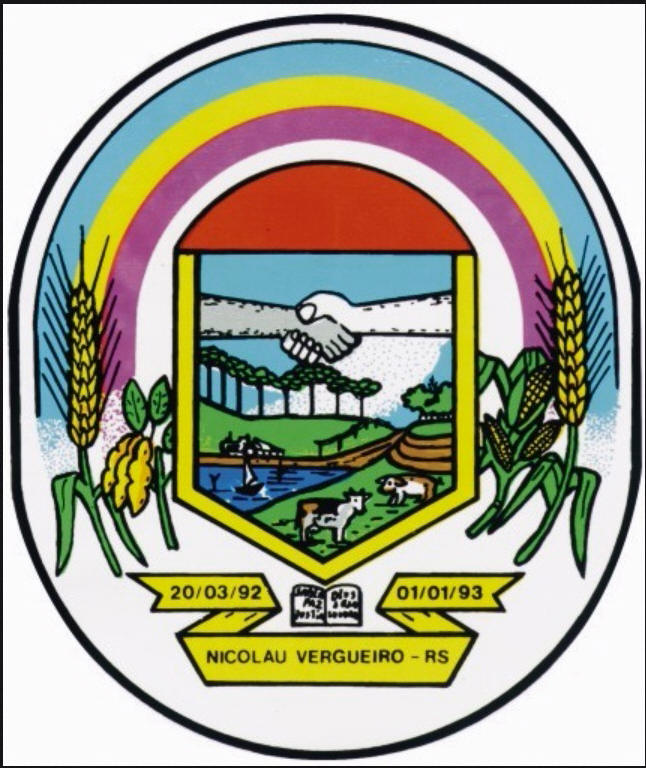
- Flag Coat of arms
- Interactive map of Nicolau Vergueiro
- Country: Brazil
- Time zone: UTC−3 (BRT)

Nicolau Vergueiro is a municipality in the state of Rio Grande do Sul, Brazil. As of 2020, the estimated population was 1,674.

== See also ==
- List of municipalities in Rio Grande do Sul
