= Ibiraiaras =

Municipality in Rio Grande do Sul, Brazil

Coordinates: 28°22′12″S 51°38′9″W

- Municipality
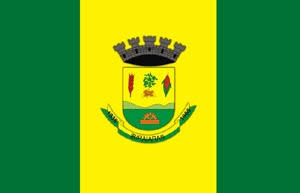
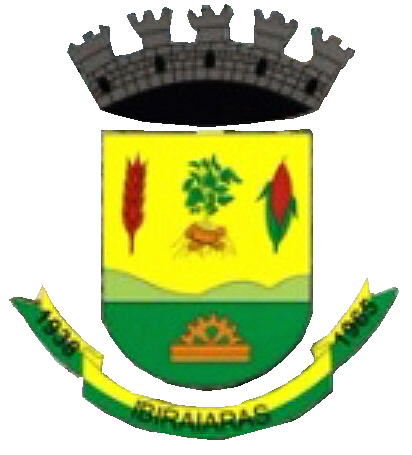
- Flag Coat of arms
- Interactive map of Ibiraiaras
- Country: Brazil
- Time zone: UTC−3 (BRT)

Ibiraiaras is a municipality in the state of Rio Grande do Sul, Brazil. As of 2020, the estimated population was 7,265.

== See also ==
- List of municipalities in Rio Grande do Sul
