= Santo Expedito do Sul =

Municipality in Rio Grande do Sul, Brazil

Coordinates: 27°54′28″S 51°38′42″W

- Municipality
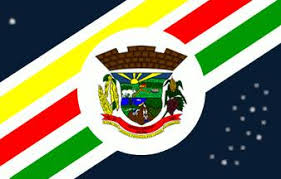
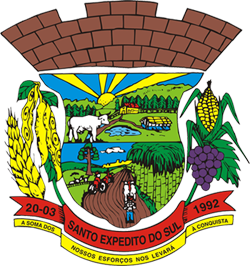
- Flag Coat of arms
- Interactive map of Santo Expedito do Sul
- Country: Brazil
- Time zone: UTC−3 (BRT)

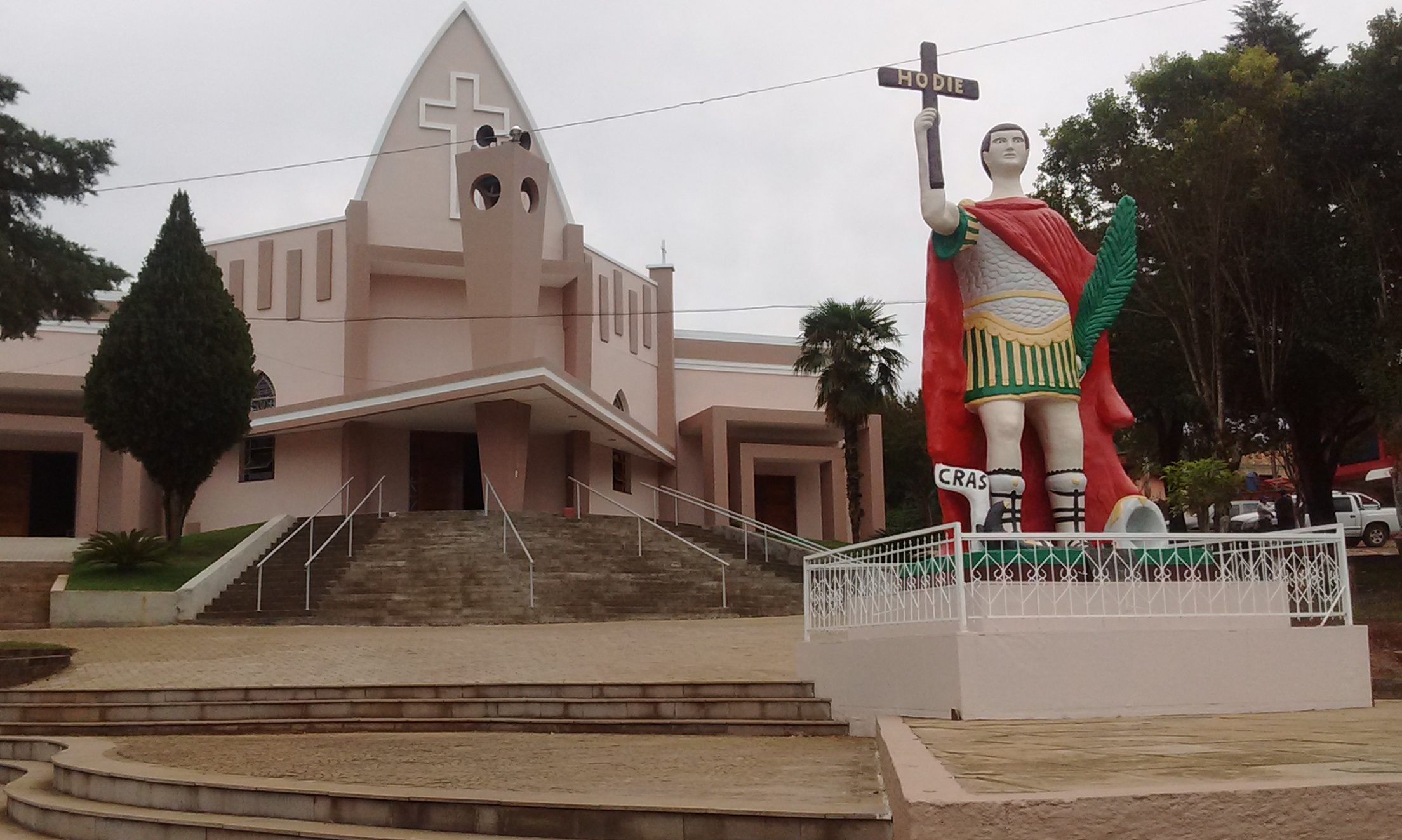
Santo Expedito sanctuary and monument, located in the city's central square

Santo Expedito do Sul is a municipality in the state of Rio Grande do Sul, Brazil. As of 2020, the estimated population was 2,305.

== See also ==
- List of municipalities in Rio Grande do Sul
