= Garruchos, Rio Grande do Sul =

Municipality of Rio Grande do Sul, Brazil

Garruchos
- Municipality
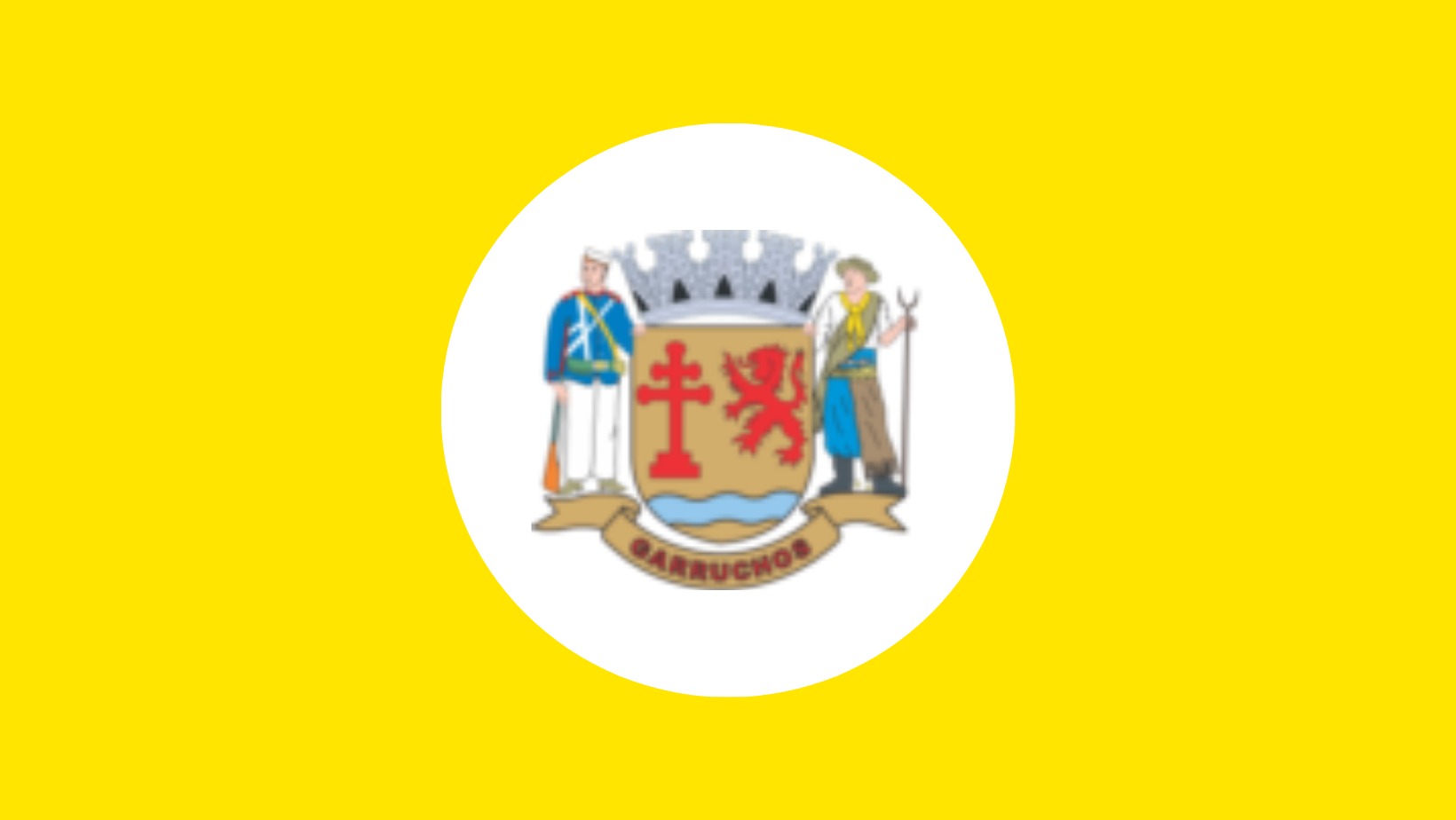
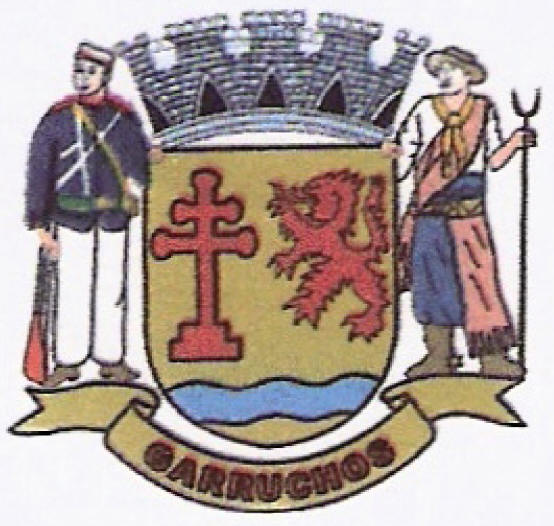
- Flag Coat of arms

- Location in Rio Grande do Sul state

- Location in Brazil
- Coordinates: 28°11′2″S 55°38′20″W
- Country: Brazil
- State: Rio Grande do Sul
- Meso-region: Sudoeste Rio-Grandense
- Micro-region: Campanha Ocidental

Area
  - Total: 799.85 km^{2} (308.82 sq mi)

Population (2020)
  - Total: 2,886
  - Density: 3.608/km^{2} (9.345/sq mi)
- Time zone: UTC−3 (BRT)
- Postal code: 97685-xxx
- Website: www.garruchos.rs.gov.br

Garruchos is a municipality in the western part of the state of Rio Grande do Sul, Brazil. The population is 2,886 (2020 est.) in an area of 799.85 km^{2} (308.82 sq mi). Its elevation is 69 m by the Uruguay River. It is located 627 km west of the state capital of Porto Alegre, northeast of Alegrete.

The town is situated by the Uruguay River which forms the border with Argentina to the west; an Argentine settlement with the same name, Garruchos, is on the other side.

The municipality would be partially flooded by the proposed Garabí Dam.

== See also ==
- List of municipalities in Rio Grande do Sul
