= Salto do Jacuí =

Municipality in Rio Grande do Sul, Brazil

Coordinates: 29°05′16″S 53°12′46″W

- Municipality
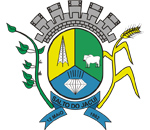
- Flag Coat of arms
- Interactive map of Salto do Jacuí
- Country: Brazil
- Time zone: UTC−3 (BRT)

Salto do Jacuí is a municipality in the state of Rio Grande do Sul, Brazil. As of 2020, the estimated population was 12,481.

== See also ==
- List of municipalities in Rio Grande do Sul
