= Misiones Orientales =

Historical region of South America

Coordinates: 26.700°S 51.400°W

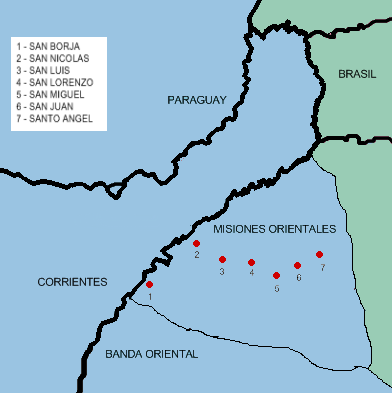
The region and villages of the Misiones Orientales

The Misiones Orientales (lit. 'Eastern Missions') (or Siete Pueblos de las Misiones (Spanish pronunciation: [miˈsjones oɾjenˈtales], Sete Povos das Missões (Portuguese pronunciation: [ˈsɛtʃi ˈpɔvuz dɐz miˈsõjs], lit. 'Seven Towns of the Missions') was a region in South America where a group of seven indigenous villages were founded by Spanish Jesuits in present-day Rio Grande do Sul, the southernmost State of Brazil.

The seven "missions" were:

- San Miguel
- Santos Ángeles
- San Lorenzo Mártir
- San Nicolás
- San Juan Bautista
- San Luis Gonzaga
- San Francisco de Borja

== Jesuit Reductions ==
Between 1609 and 1756, Misiones Orientales formed part of the Jesuit Reductions, together with present-day Misiones Province in Argentina and the former Misiones Department in Paraguay (later subdivided into Misiones and Itapúa). This was a territory almost fully independent from Spanish and Portuguese rule, created and ruled by Jesuit missionaries to the local Guaraní people. It was famous for its resistance to enslavement and egalitarian laws based on the Bible.

The King of Spain was the nominal ruler of these lands and in the Treaty of Madrid (1750) he gave the eastern part of the Jesuit Reductions to Portugal. The seven Jesuit missions here were to be dismantled and relocated on the Spanish western side of the Uruguay River. The Guarani people living there refused, which led to the Guarani War, won by Portugal and Spain.

== Return to national control ==
The territory returned to Spain in 1777 in the First Treaty of San Ildefonso, but was definitively ceded to Portugal in the Treaty of Badajoz (1801). It became part of Brazil when Brazil gained independence from Portugal in 1822.

In 1819, the Treaty of La Farola stipulated that this territory was definitely lost for Uruguay, and in exchange was built the Isla de Flores lighthouse in the Río de la Plata.

== See also ==
- Spanish Jesuit Missions of the Guaranis-related topics
- Jesuit history in South America
- List of Jesuit sites
- Sculpture of the Misiones Orientales
