= São Miguel das Missões =

Municipality of Rio Grande do Sul, Brazil

- Municipality
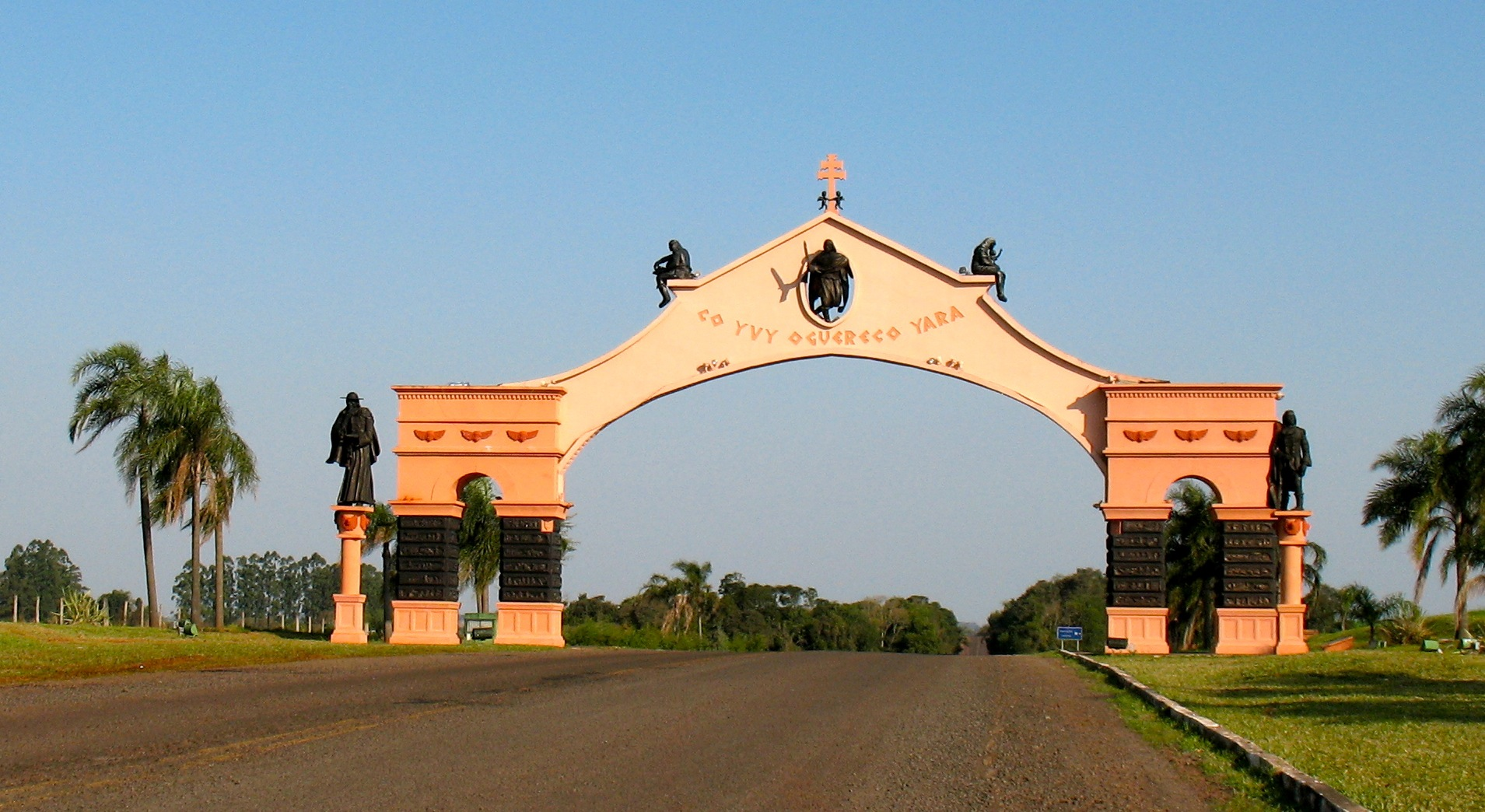
- Gateway to the city of São Miguel das Missões

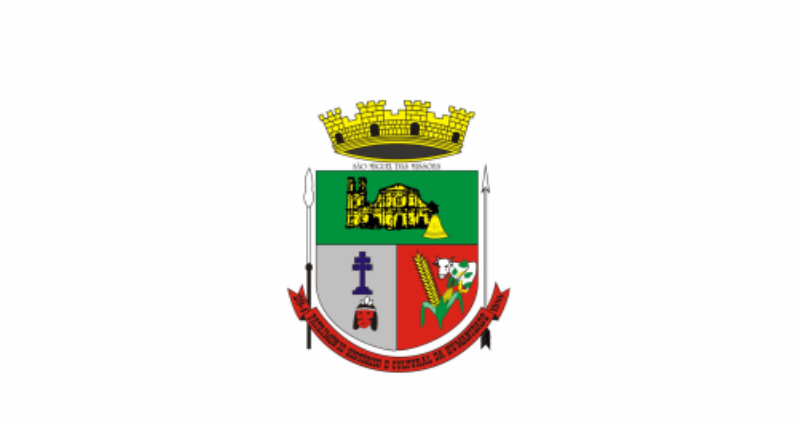
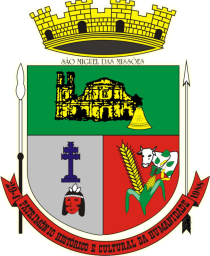
- Flag Coat of arms
- Motto: Patrimônio Histórico e Cultural da Humanidade (Historical and Cultural Heritage of Humanity)
- Location in Rio Grande do Sul state

- Location of São Miguel das Missões in Brazil
- Coordinates: 28°33′00″S 54°33′10″W
- Country: Brazil
- Region: South
- State: Rio Grande do Sul
- Mesoregion: Riograndense Northwest
- Microregion: Santo Ângelo

Government
  - Mayor: Mayor (prefeito) (Hilário Casarin)

Area
  - Total: 1,246 km^{2} (481 sq mi)
- Elevation: 305 m (1,001 ft)

Population (2020)
  - Total: 7,683
  - Density: 6.166/km^{2} (15.97/sq mi)
- Time zone: UTC−3 (BRT)
- Website: saomiguel-rs.com.br

Ruins of São Miguel das Missões
UNESCO World Heritage Site
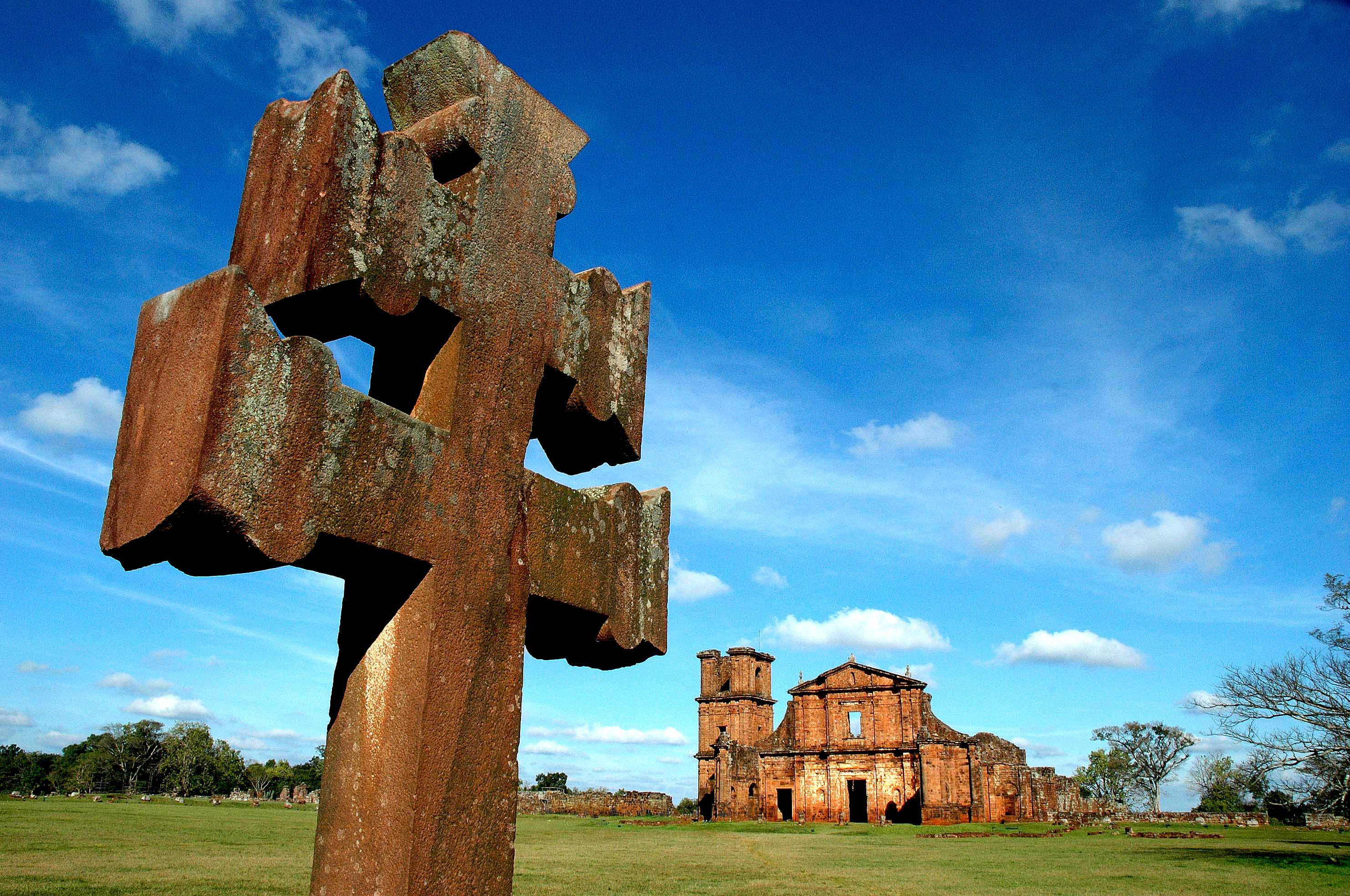
- Interactive map of Ruins of São Miguel das Missões
- Part of: Jesuit Missions of the Guaranis
- Criteria: Cultural: (iv)
- Reference: 275bis-001
- Inscription: 1983 (7th Session)
- Extensions: 1984
- Coordinates: 28°32′53″S 54°33′20″W

São Miguel das Missões is a municipality in Rio Grande do Sul state, southern Brazil. Important 17th century Spanish Jesuit mission ruins are located in the municipality. San Miguel Mission is within Santo Ângelo Microregion, and the Riograndense Northwest Mesoregion. The city covers 1,246 square kilometres (481 mi^{2}) and had a population of 7,683 residents.

== Mission São Miguel das Missões ==
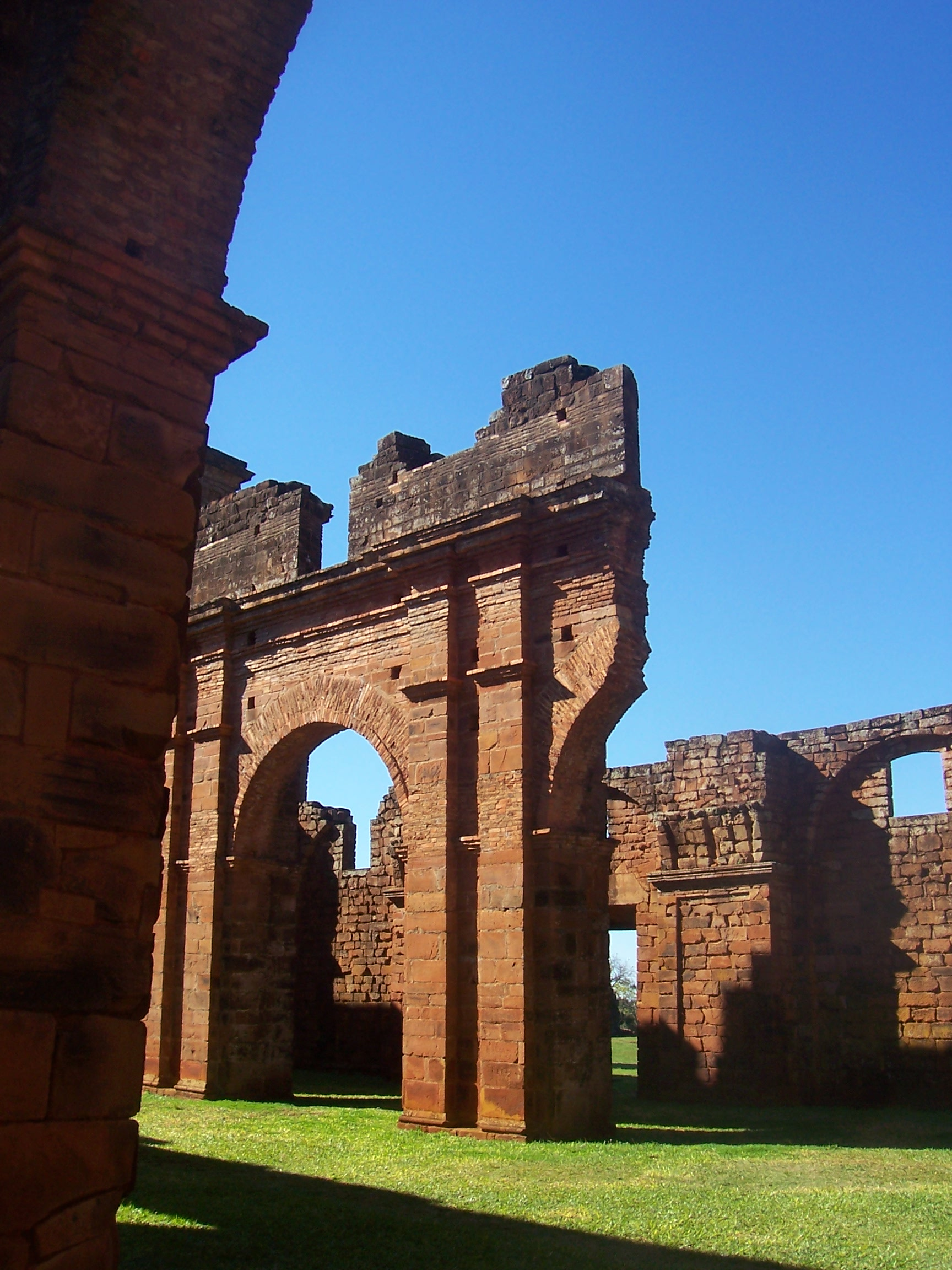
Ruins of São Miguel das Missões in January 2004

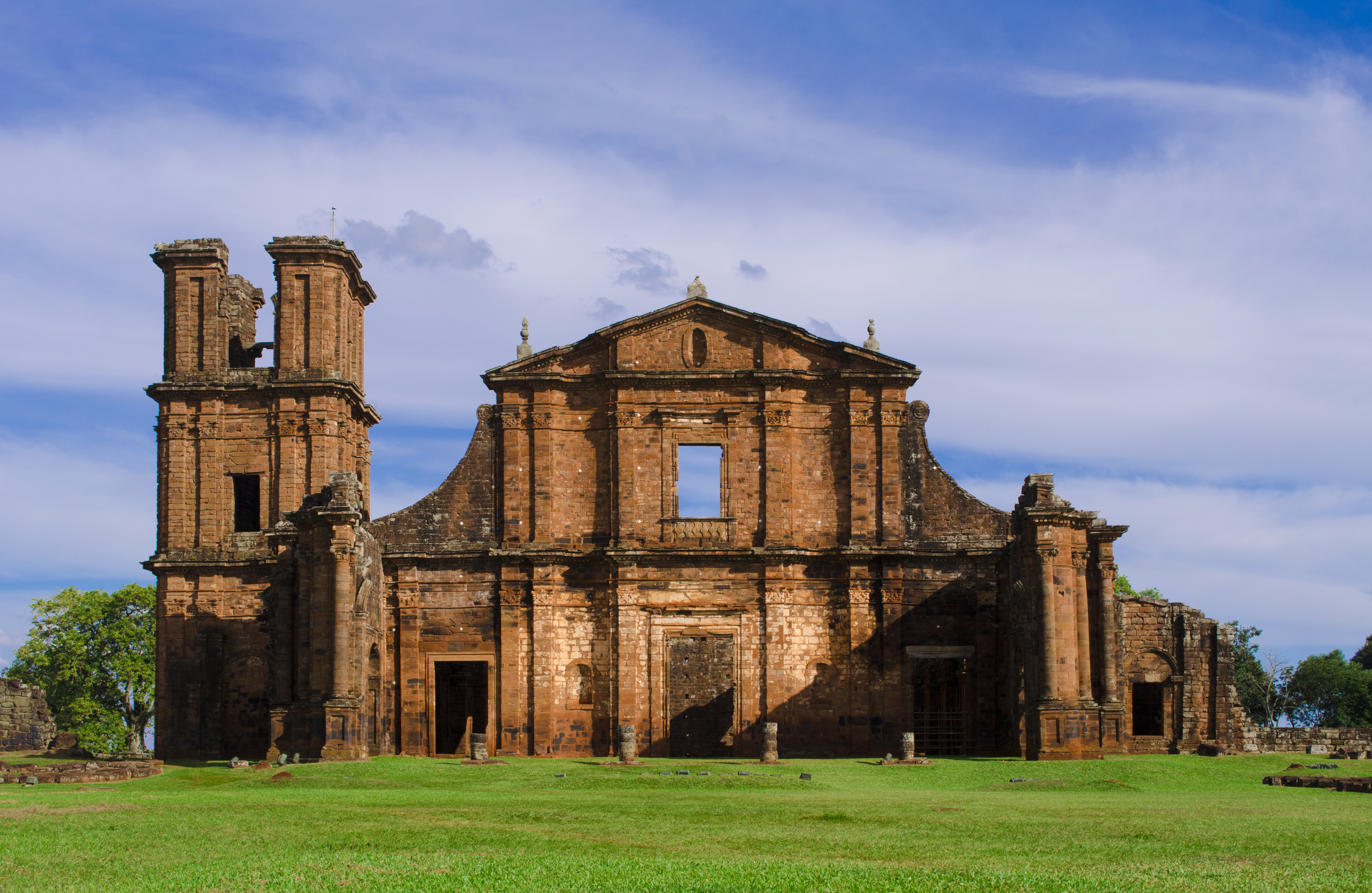
São Miguel das Missões in May 2015

The town grew around the Spanish colonial Jesuit Reduction, Mission San Miguel Arcángel, founded in 1632. After becoming part of Brazil it was renamed Mission São Miguel das Missões.

In 1984 Mission São Miguel das Missões was one of four sites of Jesuit reductions in Argentina and one in Brazil to be declared by UNESCO the Jesuit Missions of the Guaranis World Heritage Sites.

=== Museum ===
The Mission Museum is a history museum located in São Miguel Mission. The creation of the museum was one of the first initiatives of the Office of Historical and Artistic Heritage, today IPHAN. In 1937 the SPHAN was created and in the same year, the architect Lúcio Costa was sent to Rio Grande do Sul to analyze the remains of the ruins of the Seven Peoples of the Missions, and propose measures. One of his proposals was to create a museum to house the statues missionaries dispersed throughout the region. In 1938, the remnants of the town of San Miguel and the museum building were listed as National Heritage, and in 1940, the Museum of the Missions was officially established.

Between 1938 and 1940, the architect Lucas Mayerhofer directed the stabilization works in the mission Church of San Miguel, the construction of the museum building, and was in charge of gathering the works of statuary.

Currently listed in the museum's collection are religious images from the time of installation of the Jesuit missions in the region.

== See also ==
- Governorate of Paraguay
- Governorate of the Río de la Plata
- Spanish Jesuit Missions of the Guaranis-related topics
- Misiones Orientales
- Viceroyalty of the Río de la Plata
- List of municipalities in Rio Grande do Sul
