= Crissiumal =

Coordinates: 27°30′S 54°07′W

- Municipality
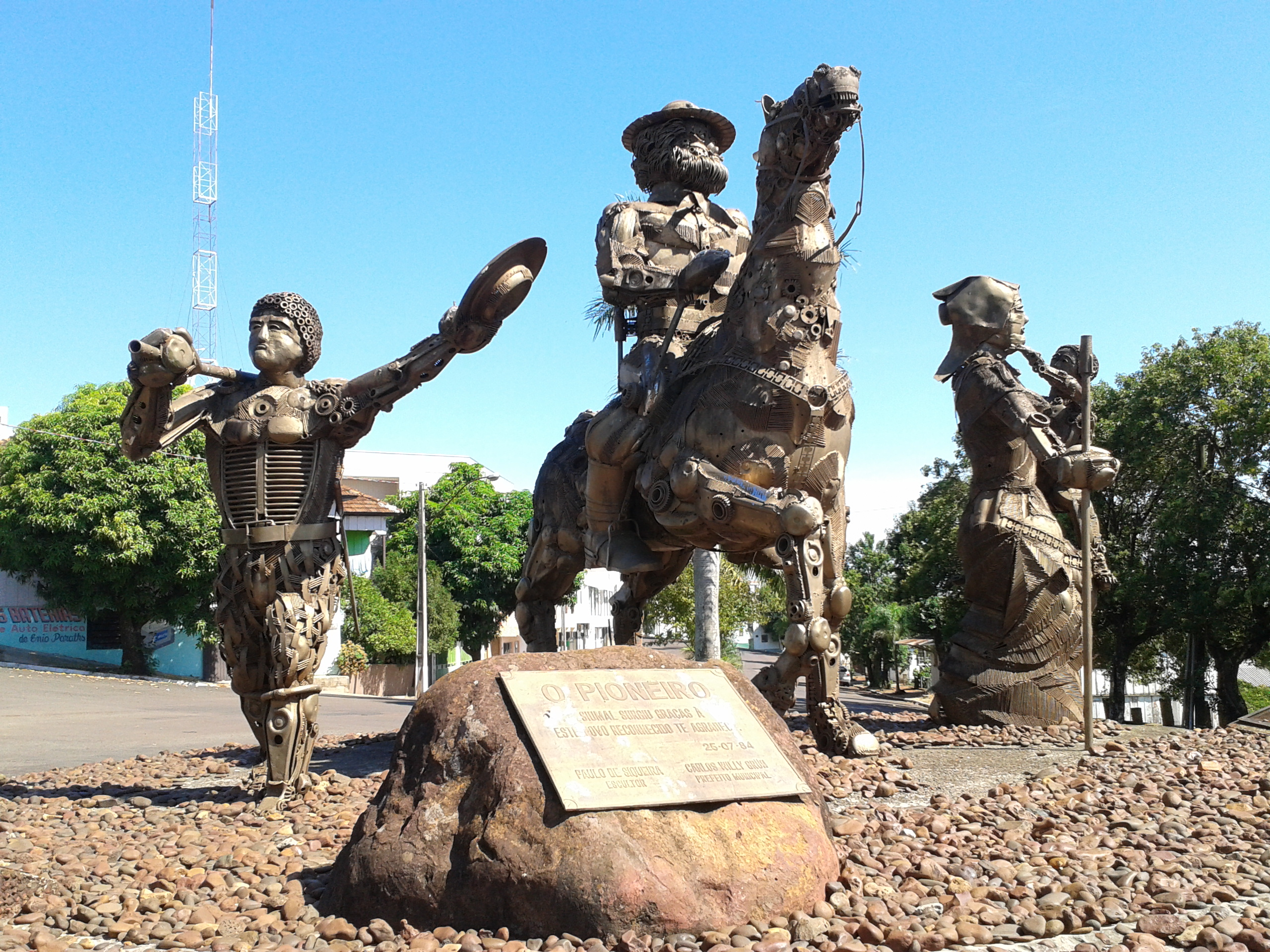
- The Pioneer Monument

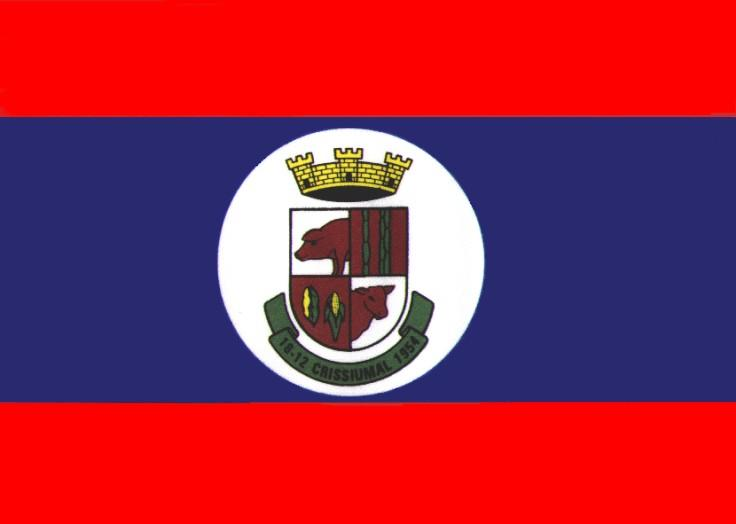
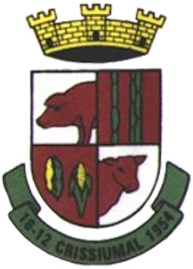
- Flag Coat of arms

- Location of Crissiumal in Rio Grande do Sul
- Country: Brazil
- Region: South
- State: Rio Grande do Sul
- Mesoregion: Noroeste Rio-Grandense
- Microregion: Três Passos
- Founded: 1933
- Emancipated: December 18, 1954

Government
  - Mayor: Marco Aurelio Nedel (PL)

Area
  - Municipality: 362.194 km^{2} (139.844 sq mi)
  - Urban: 4.24 km^{2} (1.64 sq mi)
- Elevation: 410 m (1,350 ft)

Population (2021)
  - Municipality: 13,269
  - Rank: RS: 138th BR: 2551st
  - Density: 36.635/km^{2} (94.884/sq mi)
- Demonym: Crissiumalense
- Time zone: UTC-3 (BRT)
- Postal code: 98640-000
- HDI (2010): 0.712
- HDI rank: RS: 263rd BR: 1546th
- Gini (est. IBGE/2003): 0.39
- GDP (2020): R$405,725.52
- GDP rank: RS: 155th BR: 1802nd
- GDP per capita (2020): R$30,375.5
- Climate: Humid subtropical
- Website: www.crissiumal-rs.com.br

Crissiumal (Note: According to the current orthographic norms of the 1990 Orthographic Agreement, this toponym should be spelled Criciumal. The use of the letter "C" is prescribed for words of Tupi origin. The name derives from Tupi and refers to a family of grasses. Over the years, the spelling has evolved from cresciúmal to crissiumal and finally to criciumal.) is a Brazilian municipality in the state of Rio Grande do Sul, located in the Northwest Rio Grande do Sul mesoregion and the Três Passos Microregion, at a latitude of 27°30'00" south and a longitude of 54°06'03" west, at an altitude of 410 meters. Its estimated population in 2016 was 14,233, covering an area of 363.106 km^{2}. The municipality is traversed by the waters of the Uruguay River. Its main access is via the RS-207 highway, though it is also served by the RS-305.

Crissiumal was originally founded in 1933, with official emancipation occurring in 1954. Its name is believed to originate from criciúma, a plant abundant in the region, which in the Tupi language means a smooth, flexible rod or small bamboo. The service sector currently accounts for 60% of the municipal GDP, serving as the primary source of income.

One of Crissiumal's most prominent and traditional football clubs is the Tupi Futebol Clube, established in May 1949. Crissiumal hosts various events, such as the Feast of Our Lady of Navigators and Expocris, and features several tourist attractions, including the Castle, the Pioneer Monument, and the Church of the Three Holy Martyrs of the Missions. It is known as the Gaucho capital of agro-industries. Crissiumal is the 122nd most populous city in the state and the 2133rd in Brazil.

== Etymology ==
The city's name derives from a shrub-like plant common in the region, known as criciúma. The word criciúma likely originates from the Tupi language, meaning a smooth, flexible rod or small bamboo. According to the Michaelis Dictionary, it refers to plants of the genera Criciuma or Bambusa, belonging to the grass family. The etymology of the word is unknown, and the correct spelling is "quiriciúma," as, according to Anchieta, there are no consonant clusters in the Tupi language.

== History ==
=== Colonization and emancipation of Crissiumal ===
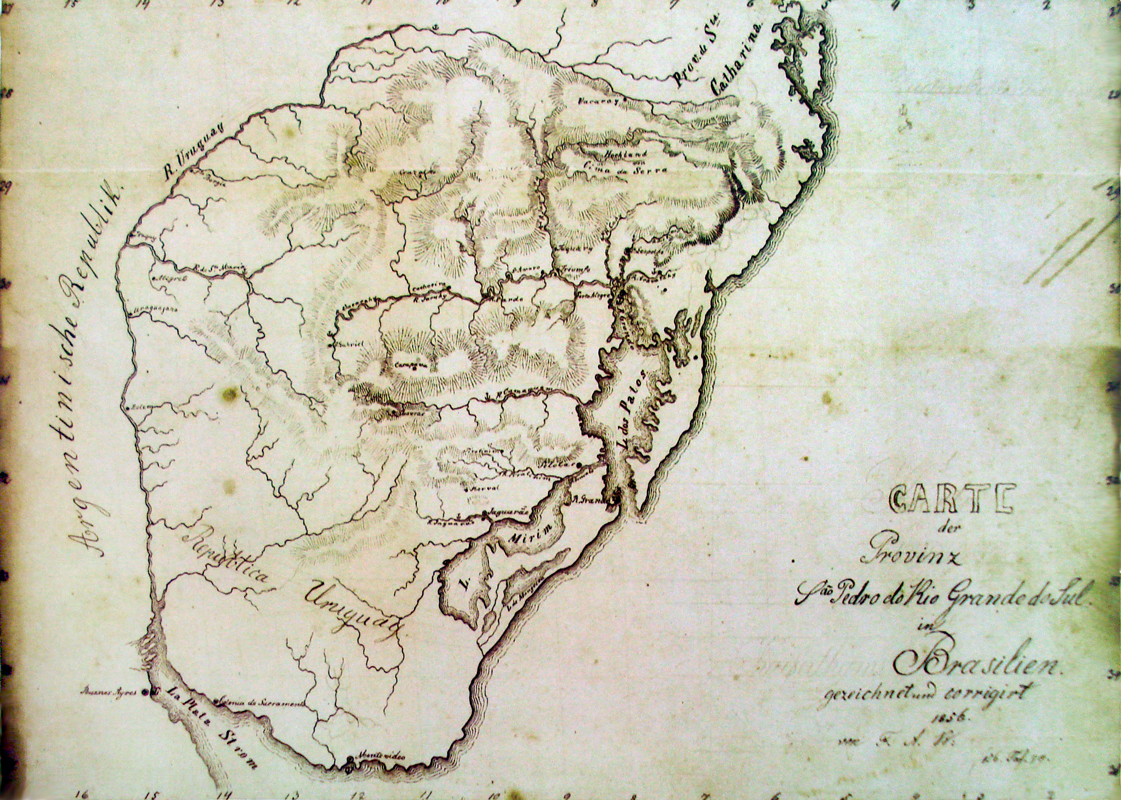
Map of the São Pedro do Rio Grande do Sul Province from 1856, showing the Uruguay River and its right-bank tributaries, suggesting that Crissiumal, due to its proximity to the river, may have been known since that year.

The first inhabitants of Crissiumal were the Tupi indigenous groups. These indigenous peoples cultivated maize, cassava, and yam, which they used to produce other foods and low-alcohol beverages. In the 1930s, two indigenous settlements, each with 60 to 70 families, existed in the areas of Bela Vista and Linha Porto Alegre. In the 1970s, artifacts such as two millstones, a pair of spurs, spears, and caves containing clay ovens were discovered there. These groups originated from Paraguay, where they had participated in an uprising against the government. After their failure, they were persecuted and fled to Brazilian territory. There is no evidence of bandeirantes passing through Crissiumal or of Jesuit missions led by religious orders in the area.

The area where Crissiumal is located was one of the last regions in Rio Grande do Sul to be settled by European colonizers. Initially, the area was occupied by indigenous groups. In the end of the late 19th century, efforts to colonize northern and northwestern Rio Grande do Sul gained momentum through the removal of bureaucratic obstacles, and the establishment of legal and logistical incentives. As the lands in the "old colonies" were already occupied, and population growth required new frontiers for settlers' descendants and new immigrants, several colonization projects were implemented in the late 19th and early 20th centuries, facilitating migration to the region. In 1890, the "Ijuí Colony" was founded, composed of newly arrived European immigrants, descendants of old colony settlers, and native peoples. Closer to Crissiumal, settlers established the "Upper Uruguay Military Colony" in 1879, which later, in 1944, became the municipality of Três Passos.

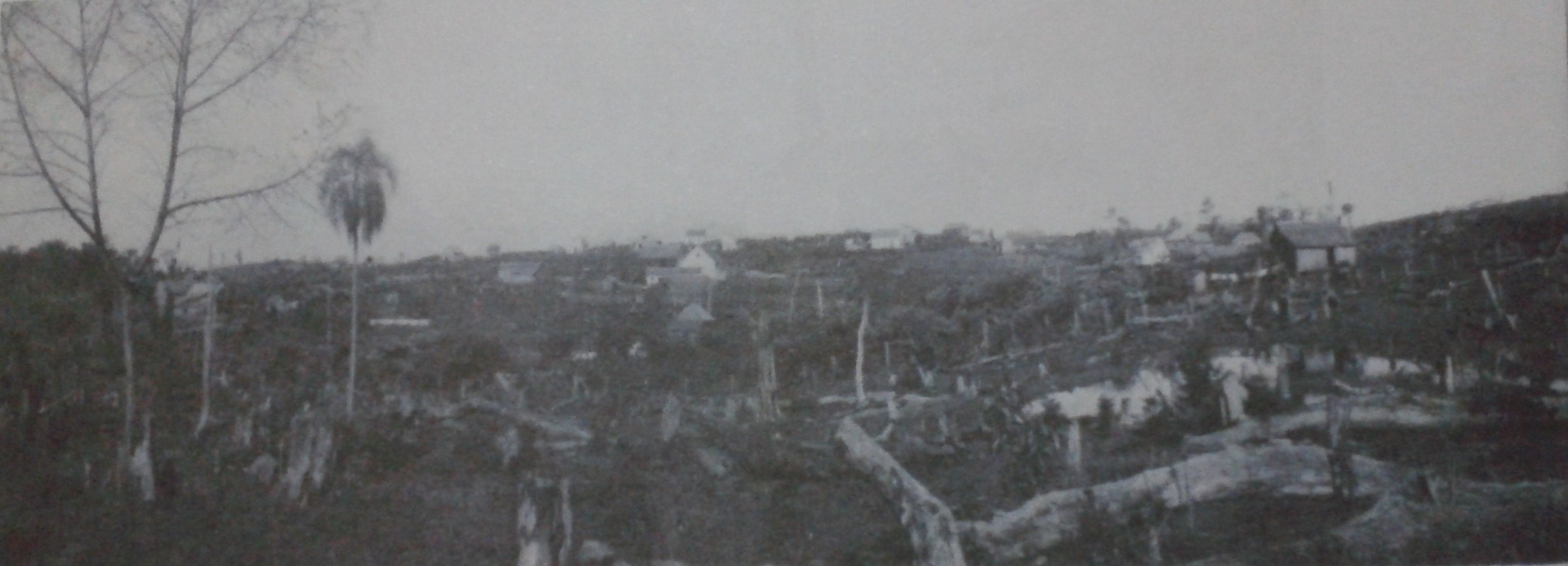
Crissiumal in 1935, two years after its founding.

Settlement and occupation of Crissiumal began in the early 1930s with colonists from the municipalities of Estrela, Lajeado, Sobradinho, Venâncio Aires, and Roca Sales in Rio Grande do Sul, and from Laguna, Tubarão, Criciúma, and Urussanga in Santa Catarina. The first European settler to arrive in Crissiumal was Domingos Maccari, a foreman for the firm Dahne, Conceição & Cia., in 1930. He was followed by Domingos Meneghel in 1933, Adolfo Rinaldi, Ivo dos Santos, Albino Löwe, Bernardo Dickel, and Miguel Schutz, some with their families. On January 6, 1936, the first mass was celebrated, and the first chapel was built on January 23 of the same year. The fertility of the land attracted relatives and acquaintances of the pioneers, leading to an influx of new settlers. Roads were carved through the forest, and ox carts and trucks transported the colony's products to larger centers. In the book History of Crissiumal, José Raymundo Pletsch, based on accounts from Adelina Frieda Schütz, described the scene during Crissiumal's early colonization:

At the beginning of settlement (...) there was no school, no doctor, no midwife. (...) Wild animals roamed near homes. It was difficult to sell agricultural products. They could only sell lard and eggs. The supply of basic foodstuffs was also precarious until the opening of the first commercial establishment, owned by Mr. Albino Loew. As the population grew, various professionals gradually settled in the village of Crissiumal.

Schwanke and Pohl also describe how the first settlers arrived in Crissiumal:

According to Pedro Oswaldo Scheid, newspapers in the Old Colonies advertised fertile land in Crissiumal. The advertisements motivated mainly young couples to venture out, leaving the comfort of their homeland and facing many hardships in the name of progress.

According to Mrs. Hedy Schwingel Hetzel, men usually came alone to inspect the land. After securing a purchase agreement with the Dahne Conceição company, they cleared the forest, burned the vegetation, and built a shack covered with grass, palm leaves, or wooden shingles to house their families. Then they would fetch their wives, children, and sometimes relatives to settle in the new land. Possessions were transported by trucks, ox carts, horses, and buses known as "Mala-Branca". The pioneers (...) arrived in Crissiumal with some provisions and few household items. (...) The Serrana Company bus brought settlers without a fixed schedule due to poor road conditions. The bus, called "Mala-Branca" because it had a designated space for hanging white cotton bags used at the time, carried passengers. (...)

Settlers chose their plots using a map and were guided through trails marked by surveyors. (...) They carried rice, which they cooked in bamboo tubes at the campsite, and also relied on hunted game. The work was risky due to the dense, extensive forest and the known presence of ferocious animals in the region.

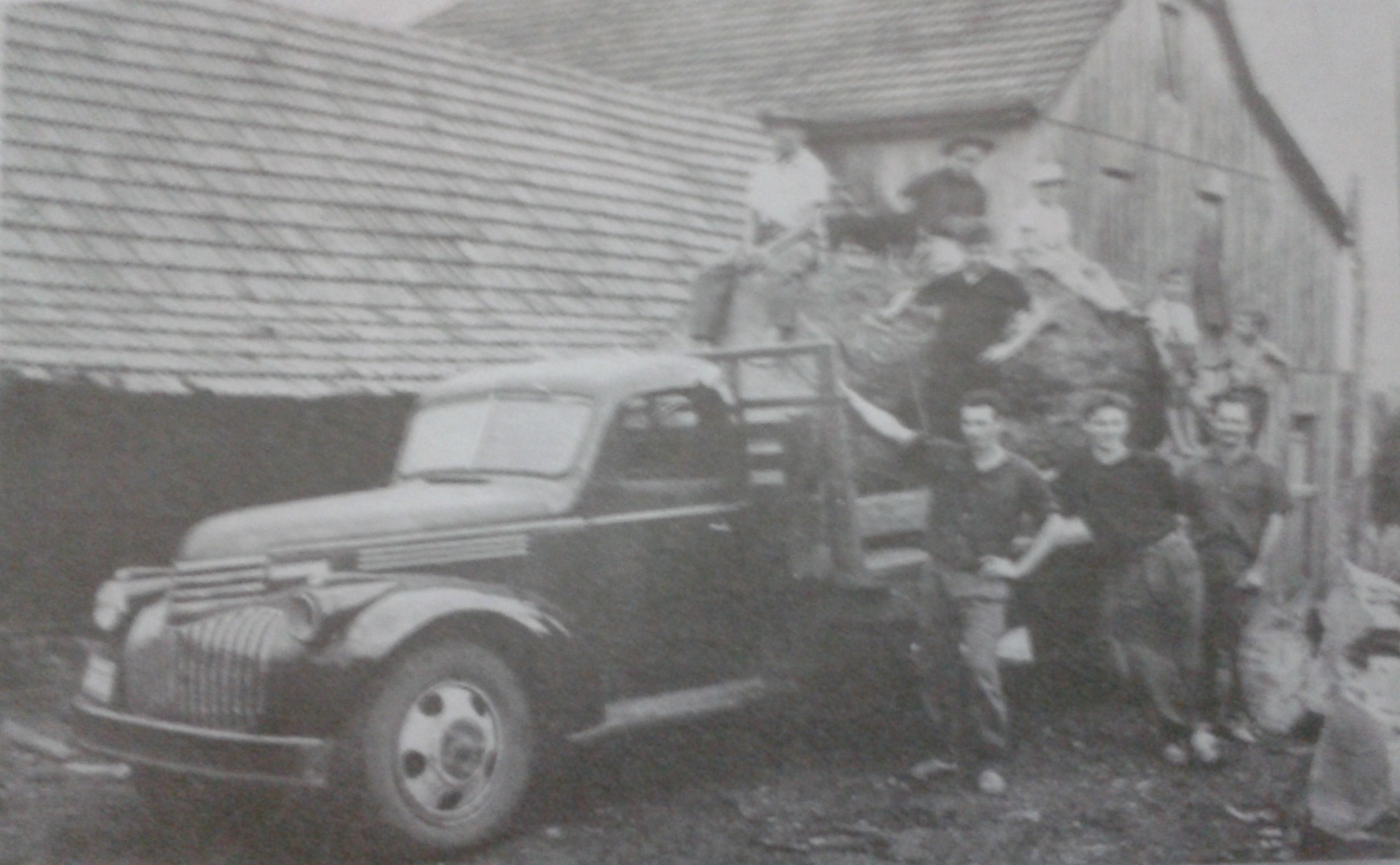
The first motorized vehicle in Crissiumal, in 1935.

On January 6, 1936, Crissiumal was recognized as a village. On January 1, 1941, the first baptism took place, and on January 3, the first marriage, between Ruy Mesch and Josefina Focking, was celebrated by the first parish priest, Father Sebastião Rademaker. In 1944, Crissiumal and Três Passos united to seek emancipation, and on December 28, 1944, State Decree-Law No. 716 created the municipality of Três Passos and the Crissiumal District. In the 1950 Census, the Crissiumal District had more inhabitants than the municipal seat, leading to an emancipation movement. In a 1954 plebiscite, the population voted to separate from Três Passos. State Law No. 2,553, enacted on December 18, 1954, established the municipality of Crissiumal.

=== From emancipation to the 1990s ===
Egon Theophilo Heinsch described the atmosphere of Crissiumal in 1956 in his book Crissiumal: A Bit of History: Tupy F.C. and Its Struggle:

Upon arriving in Crissiumal with my family on September 1, 1956, to assume the position of Treasurer of the Municipal Government at the invitation of Mayor Lauro Pedro Thomas, the initial impression was not very favorable: electricity, supplied by the Lunardi Sawmill, was available only until a certain hour at night; well water was brackish; there was no paving: in dry weather, dust prevailed, and when it rained, mud took over. Gradually, however, we adapted.

After emancipation, direct elections for mayor and councilors were held on February 20, 1955. Lauro Pedro Thomaz, the only candidate for mayor, was elected, took office on February 28, 1955, and governed until January 1, 1960. During his administration, the sub-prefecture building was adapted to house administrative and legislative functions temporarily. Municipal roads were improved and widened, a city master plan was developed, new teachers were hired, schools were built, the town center and the villages of Humaitá and Vista Nova were electrified, and artesian wells were drilled for potable water, though no water was found.

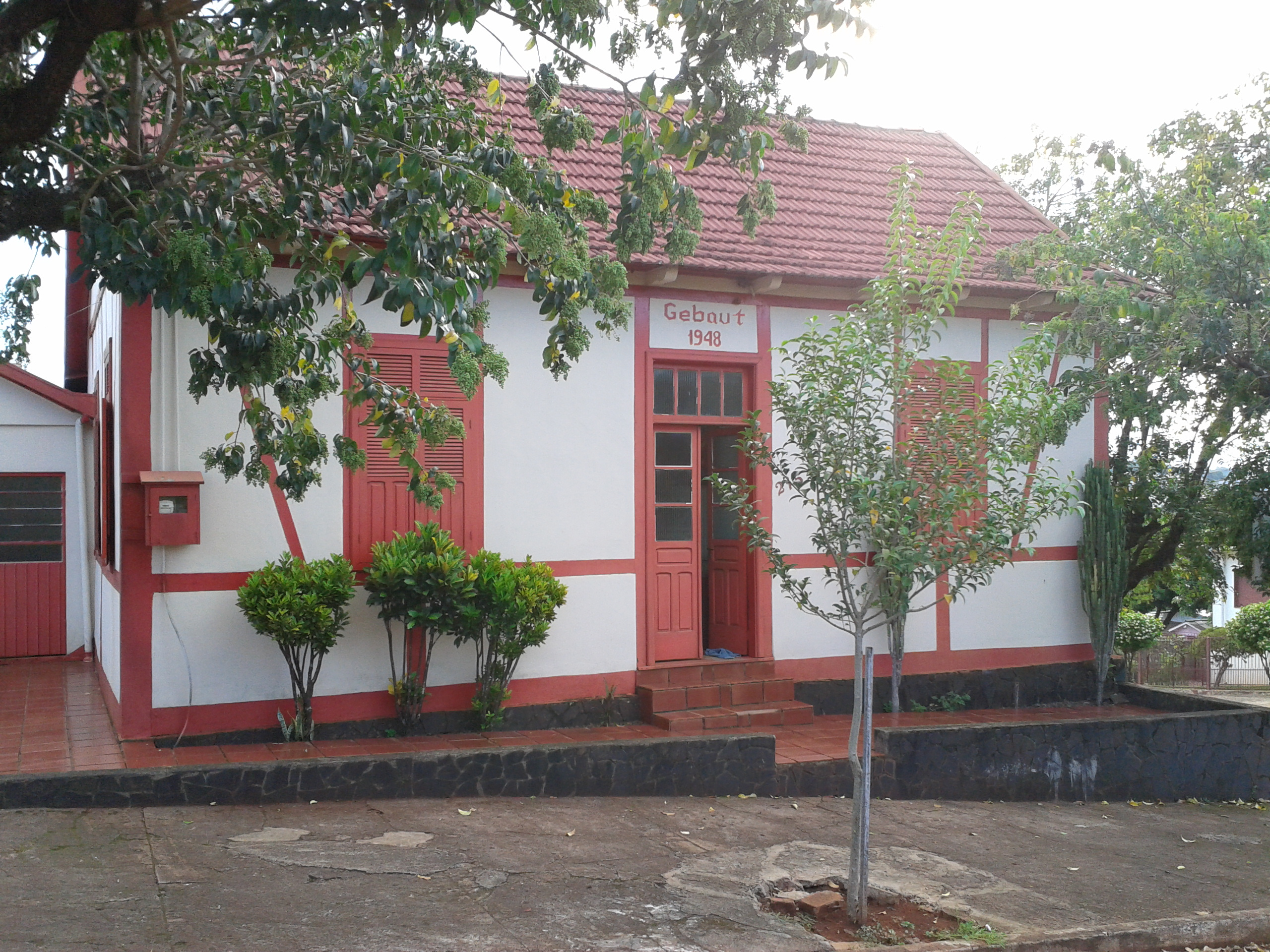
A half-timbered house built in 1948.

The second mayor, Alcido Brust, was elected by direct and secret vote through the PTB-PRB coalition. His administration saw the installation of a municipal telephone network, the construction of a works yard, the installation of a stone crusher, the building of wooden schools funded by the state government called brizoletas, the electrification of Lajeado Crissiumal, Vista Alegre, and Linha Porto Alegre, the construction of a masonry building for the Rocha Pombo School with state funding, and the remodeling of the 25 de Julho Square.

The third mayor, Pedro Harry Hoffmann, governed from 1964 to 1969. During his term, some streets in the town center were paved and tree-lined, the 25 de Julho Square was completed, the foundation and lower part of the new municipal building were constructed, over 100 telephones were installed, twelve localities were electrified, an ASCAR office was established, an exposition park was built, and fourteen new primary schools were created and constructed.

From 1965, Crissiumal was designated a National Security Area due to its border with Argentina, and mayors were appointed by the President of Brazil. The first appointed mayor was Benno Bender, who led the municipal executive from July 7, 1971, to August 9, 1975. His administration saw the town center supplied with water by Corsan, the construction of a police station, the Ponche Verde State High School, and several school buildings. The second appointed mayor, Pedro Osvaldo Scheid, served from August 9, 1975, to August 7, 1980, to August 1. During his administration, the LBA, Cebem, and Apae centers were established, new schools were built, a new municipal building was constructed, a television retransmission tower was installed, a quarry was established, and a Banco do Brasil branch was opened.

The third appointed mayor, Carlos Willy Grün, served from August 1, 1980, to January 1, 1986. During this period, a sports gymnasium, the Pioneer Monument, and the Rio Grande do Sul Telecommunications Company (CRT) building were constructed, the Direct Dialing System (DDD) was implemented, the first daycare was built, and the second floor of the municipal government building was completed. After redemocratization, National Security Areas were abolished, and Crissiumal resumed direct elections for mayors. Henrique Ebeling served as mayor from 1986 to 1988, during which time Castelo Branco Avenue was paved, bridges and schools were constructed. Luiz de Rosso served from 1989 to 1992.

=== Administrative formation ===
Before its colonization, the area belonged to Porto Alegre, then to Rio Pardo in 1809, and to Cachoeira in 1819. and to Espírito Santo de Cruz Alta by 1834. After colonization, it was part of Palmeira das Missões, then called Santo Antônio da Palmeira, and later Três Passos. When part of Palmeira das Missões, Crissiumal was included in its 11th District, headquartered in Santa Teresinha. In 1944, the Crissiumal District was created by State Decree-Law No. 716 of December 28, from parts of the Ivagaci, Três Passos, and Campo Novo districts. In 1954, State Law No. 2553 of December 18 created the municipality of Crissiumal, which separated from Três Passos. In 1955, the districts of Candelária (Municipal Law No. 54, December 12), Esquina Gaúcha (Municipal Law No. 58, December 28), and Planalto (Municipal Law No. 59, December 28) were created, and in 1957, the Lajeado Grande District (Municipal Law No. 179, July 9). In 1959, Crissiumal lost territory due to the emancipation of Humaitá. In 1963, the Candelária District separated to form the municipality of Boa Vista do Buricá. In 1987, Municipal Law No. 851 of December 12 created the Vista Nova District.

=== Recent history ===
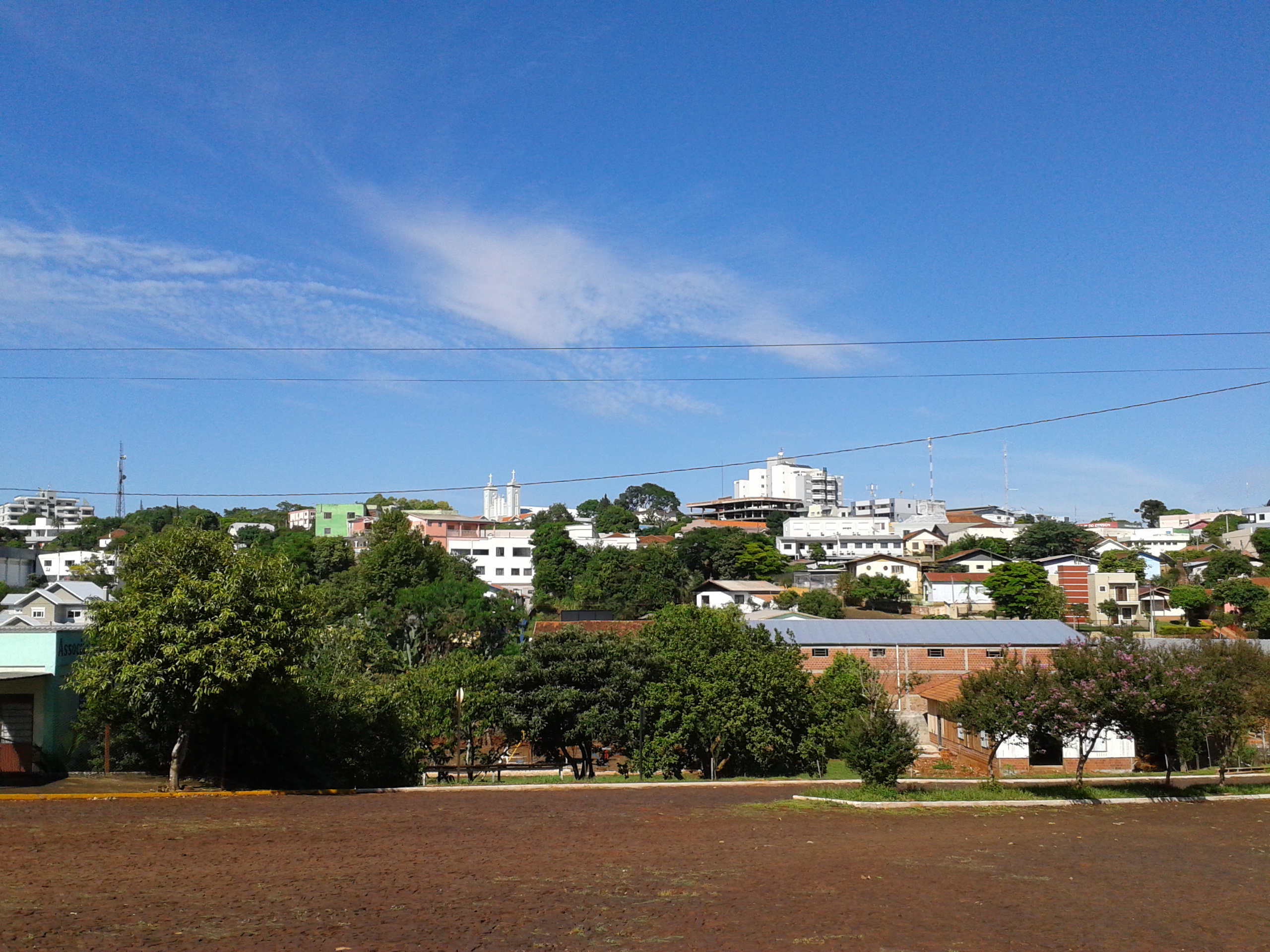
View of downtown Crissiumal in 2017, from Santa Rosa Avenue near the Recanto Verde square.

Henrique Ebeling was re-elected and served as mayor from 1993 to 1996. In 1997, Alvício Pereira Duarte took office and governed until 2000. In 2001, Walter Luiz Heck became mayor, was re-elected, and served until 2008, when Sérgio Drumm took office in 2009, serving until 2012.

In 1998, the Fonte Nova Pact was created to support small-scale farmers in producing raw materials, agro-industrialization, and food production. Alongside the program, the Municipal Inspection Service (SIM) was established, issuing Municipal Inspection Permits to certify the quality and origin of industrialized products. By the end of 2002, the 30 existing agro-industries formed the Cooper Fonte Nova cooperative to strengthen farmers’ activities.

A significant climatic event occurred in Crissiumal on the early morning of June 15, 2005, when hailstones weighing 300 to 500 grams fell, accompanied by winds exceeding 150 km/h. It was the most severe storm and the greatest disaster in the municipality's history. According to the GVces website, "Around 3:30 a.m., entire windows were shattered by ice stones the size of oranges. Holes in roofs gave the impression that Crissiumal had been bombed." Over a third of the city was affected, and there was solidarity from residents and neighboring towns, who aided in rebuilding homes. The Rio Grande do Sul state government sent 600 kg of non-perishable food, 100 blankets, 1,700 pieces of clothing and shoes, ten rolls of tarpaulin, and forage seeds to the municipality. Another event occurred in August 2009 when a storm damaged homes and crops and uprooted trees.

In December 2012, the Rio Grande do Sul Civil Police conducted an operation named Patriota, investigating crimes such as embezzlement, fraud, rigged bidding, overpriced purchases of medicines and construction materials for public works, and diversion of materials from the works yard to buy votes in elections. 110 agents executed 25 search and seizure warrants and 13 arrest warrants.

In the 2012 municipal elections, Walter Luiz Heck was re-elected mayor with 50.46% of valid votes, but his mandate was revoked by the Superior Electoral Court in February 2015 for offering money and public positions to candidates and councilors from an opposing coalition to withdraw their candidacies and support his campaign. Walter was declared ineligible for eight years from 2012, and the president of the City Council, Renato Salling, took office, governing until Roberto Bergmann, elected in supplementary elections in June 2015, assumed the mayoralty.

== Geography ==
=== Location ===
Crissiumal is located at a latitude of 27°29'59" south and a longitude of 54°06'04" west, at an altitude of 410 meters. It is bordered to the east by Três Passos, to the south by Humaitá and Nova Candelária, to the west by Horizontina and Doutor Maurício Cardoso, and to the north by Argentina and Tiradentes do Sul. The municipality is bounded from east to northwest by the Lajeado Grande River until its confluence with the Uruguay River. To the northwest, it is delimited by the Uruguay River up to the mouth of the Buricá River, which marks the western boundary. To the south, it is delimited by the Reúno River and its tributaries, and to the east by the Lajeado Jacu. Crissiumal belongs to the Northwest Rio Grande do Sul Mesoregion and the Três Passos Microregion. The distance to the state capital, Porto Alegre, is disputed and varies by source. According to Pletsch and Vicentini, it is 548 km. Under the state division of Regional Development Councils, Crissiumal is part of the Colonial Northwest Regional Council (CRNOC), and in the division of municipal associations, it belongs to the Association of Municipalities of the Celeiro Region (Amuceleiro).

=== Topography ===
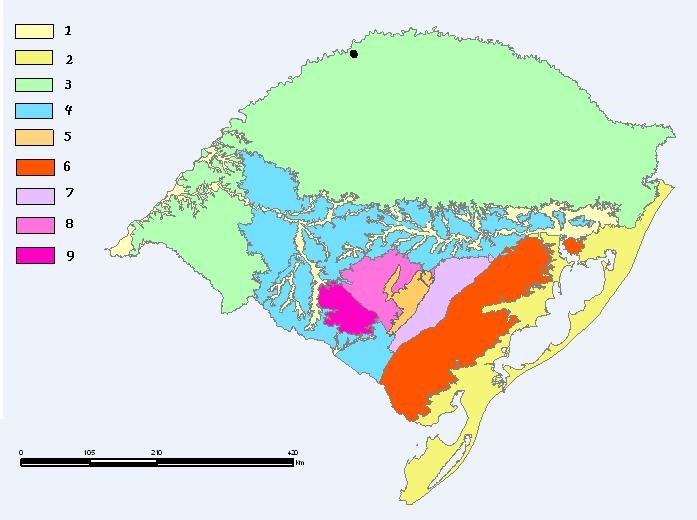
Location of Crissiumal in the North Rio-Grandense Plateau, highlighted in green.

The municipality is situated in the North Rio-Grandense Plateau, formed by basaltic lava flows from the Mesozoic Era, extending from southern Goiás to Rio Grande do Sul, forming Brazil's Southern Plateau. The terrain ranges from gently undulating to strongly undulating and mountainous, with more rugged areas near the Uruguay, Buricá, Lajeado Grande rivers, and their tributaries. Relatively flat areas exist along these watercourses but are limited in extent. The lowest altitude, approximately 120 meters, is found in the west at the mouth of the Buricá River, while the highest, reaching 472 meters, is near the boundary with Humaitá in the west. The town center's altitude is 410 meters. The soil derives from basic igneous rocks of the Serra Geral Formation, with basalt as the substrate, predominantly featuring dystrophic red latosol and chernozem. Latosol is deep, well-drained, acidic, and low in fertility, suitable for agriculture if chemically corrected. Chernozem, dark in the A horizon due to organic matter, has high fertility and varies from shallow to deep.

=== Hydrography ===
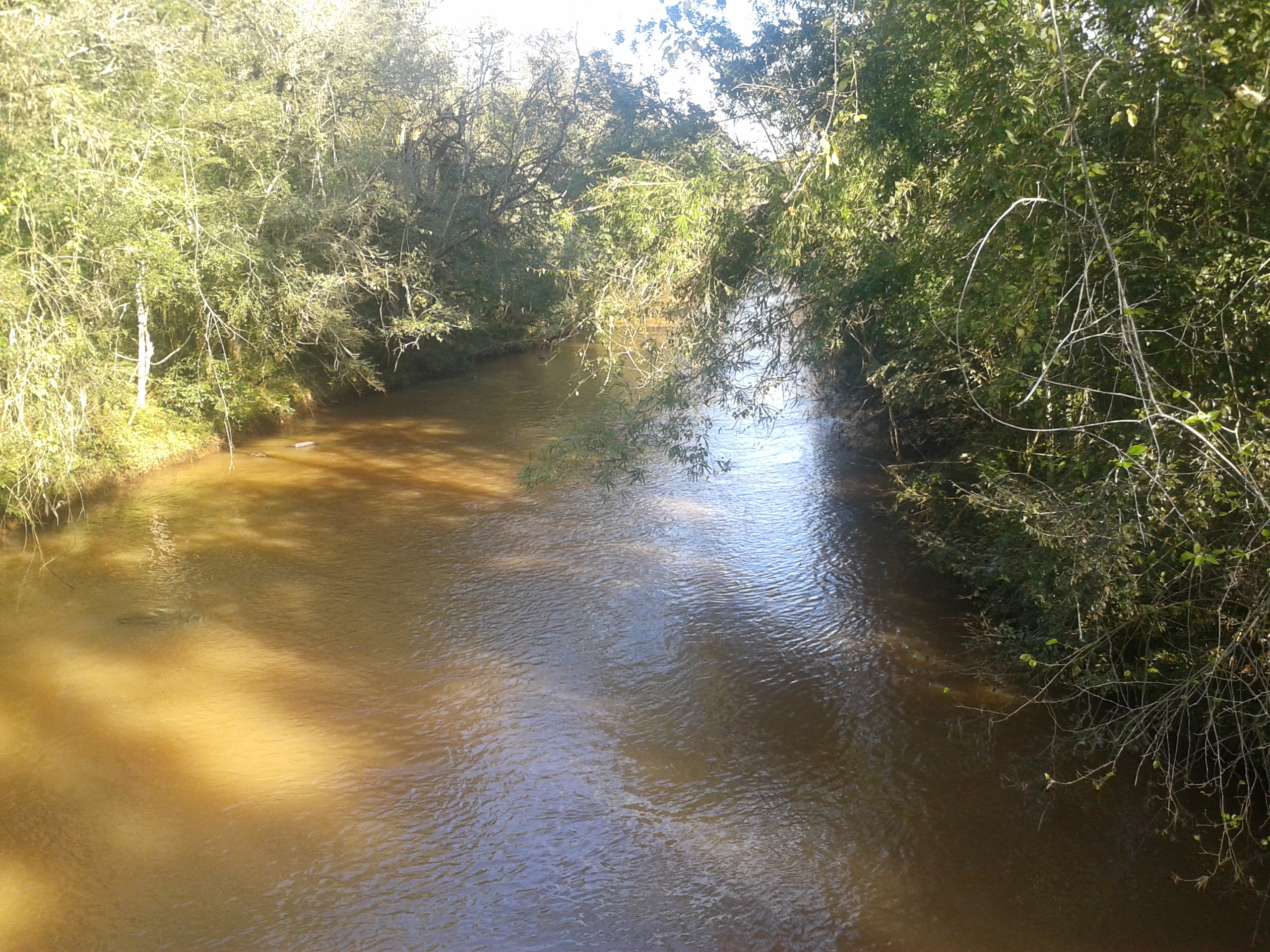
Lajeado Grande River

Crissiumal is situated in the Uruguay River Basin and the Turvo-Santa Rosa-Santo Cristo Sub-basin. The main rivers are the Uruguay, Buricá, Lajeado Grande, and Reúno, along with smaller watercourses known as lajeados, including Principal, Caçador, Mirim, Teimoso, Fazenda, and Nass. The Uruguay River is formed by the confluence of the Canoas and Pelotas rivers at the border between Rio Grande do Sul and Santa Catarina, marking the border between Brazil and Argentina. It flows into the Río de la Plata and has major Brazilian tributaries, including the Canoas, Pelotas, Passo Fundo, Chapecó, Ijuí, Ibicuí, and Quaraí. The Lajeado Grande River originates from the confluence of the Lajeado Herval Novo and Lajeado Herval Grande rivers in Campo Novo. Its flow increases as it passes through Crissiumal, Três Passos, and Tiradentes do Sul before joining the Uruguay River. The Buricá River, with a length of 195 km, has its main sources in Chiapetta, and its main tributary, the Inhacorá River, originates in Santo Augusto, Chiapetta, São Valério do Sul, and Alegria. These rivers have potential for hydroelectric power generation. Swine farming pollutes watercourses, and mechanized agriculture accelerates erosion, carrying soil into rivers.

Part of Crissiumal's territory lies over the Serra Geral I Aquifer System, and part over the Serra Geral II Aquifer System. The Serra Geral I Aquifer, covering the southeastern part of the municipality, including the urban area, is capped by thick reddish soil and has a specific capacity of 1 to 4 m^{3}/h/m. The Serra Geral II Aquifer, near the Uruguay River, has a specific capacity below 0.5 m^{3}/h/m. The Serra Geral I Aquifer has high to medium potential for groundwater in rocks with fracture porosity, while the Serra Geral II has medium to low potential.

=== Environment ===
==== Flora ====
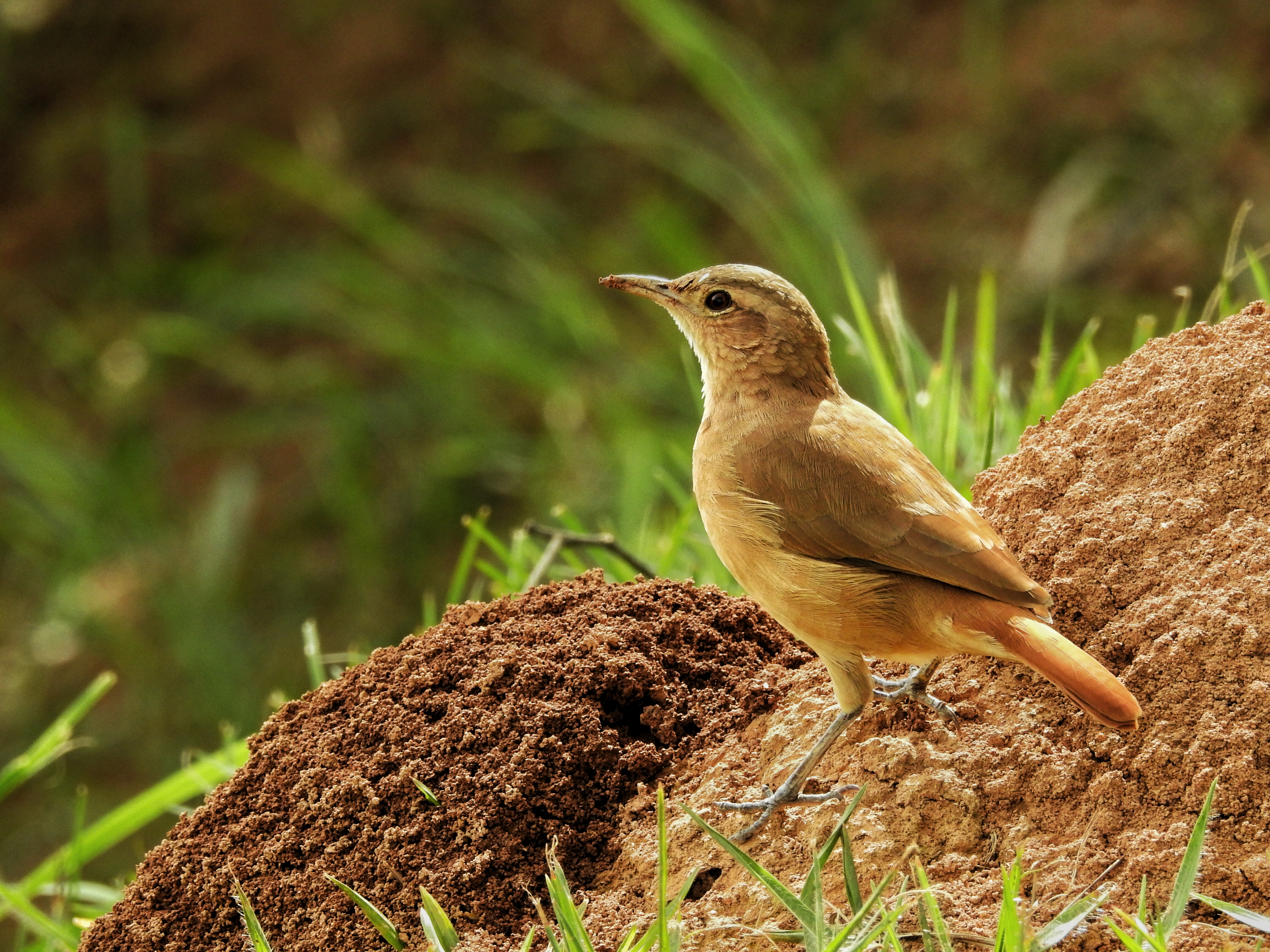
Rufous hornero

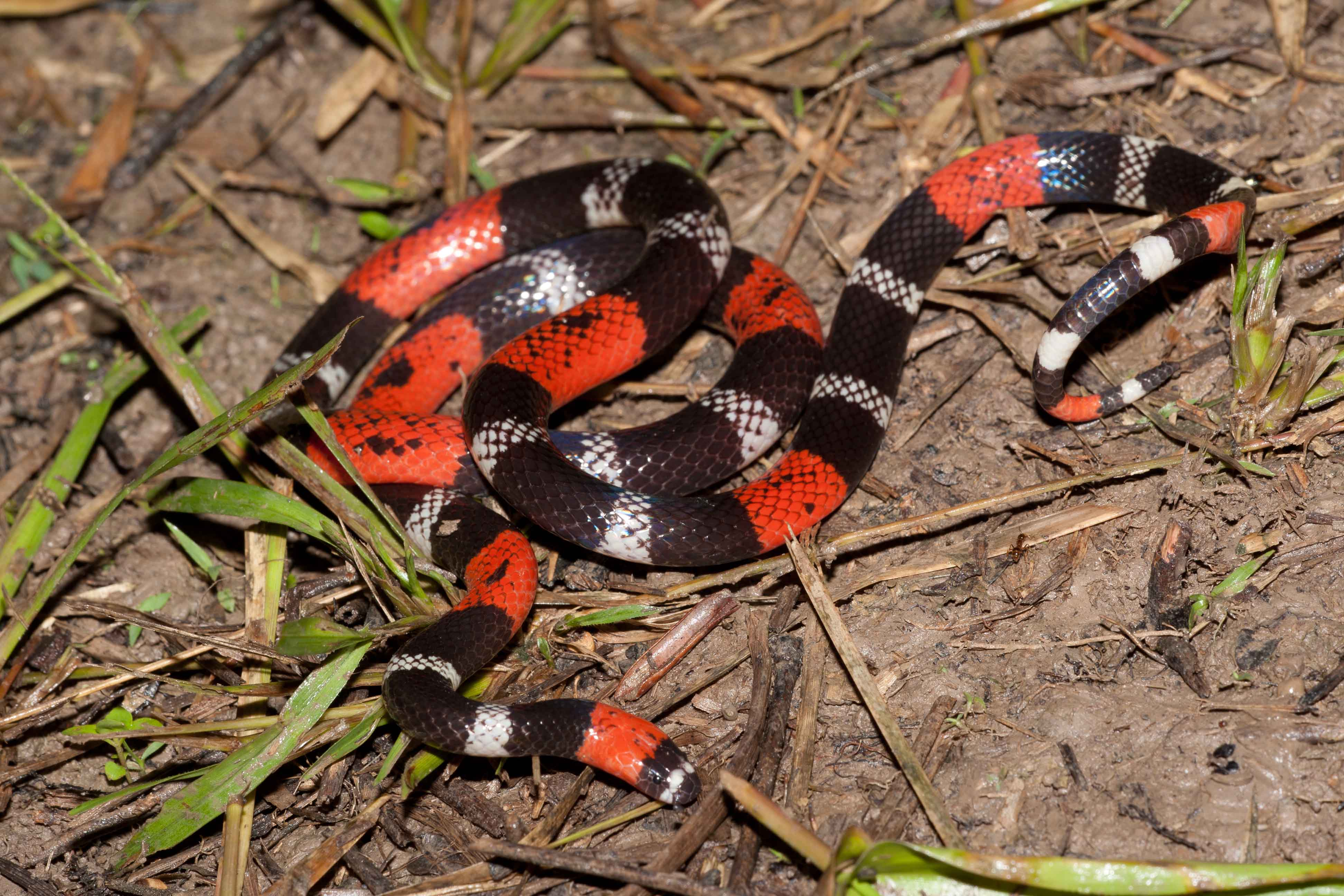
Coral snake

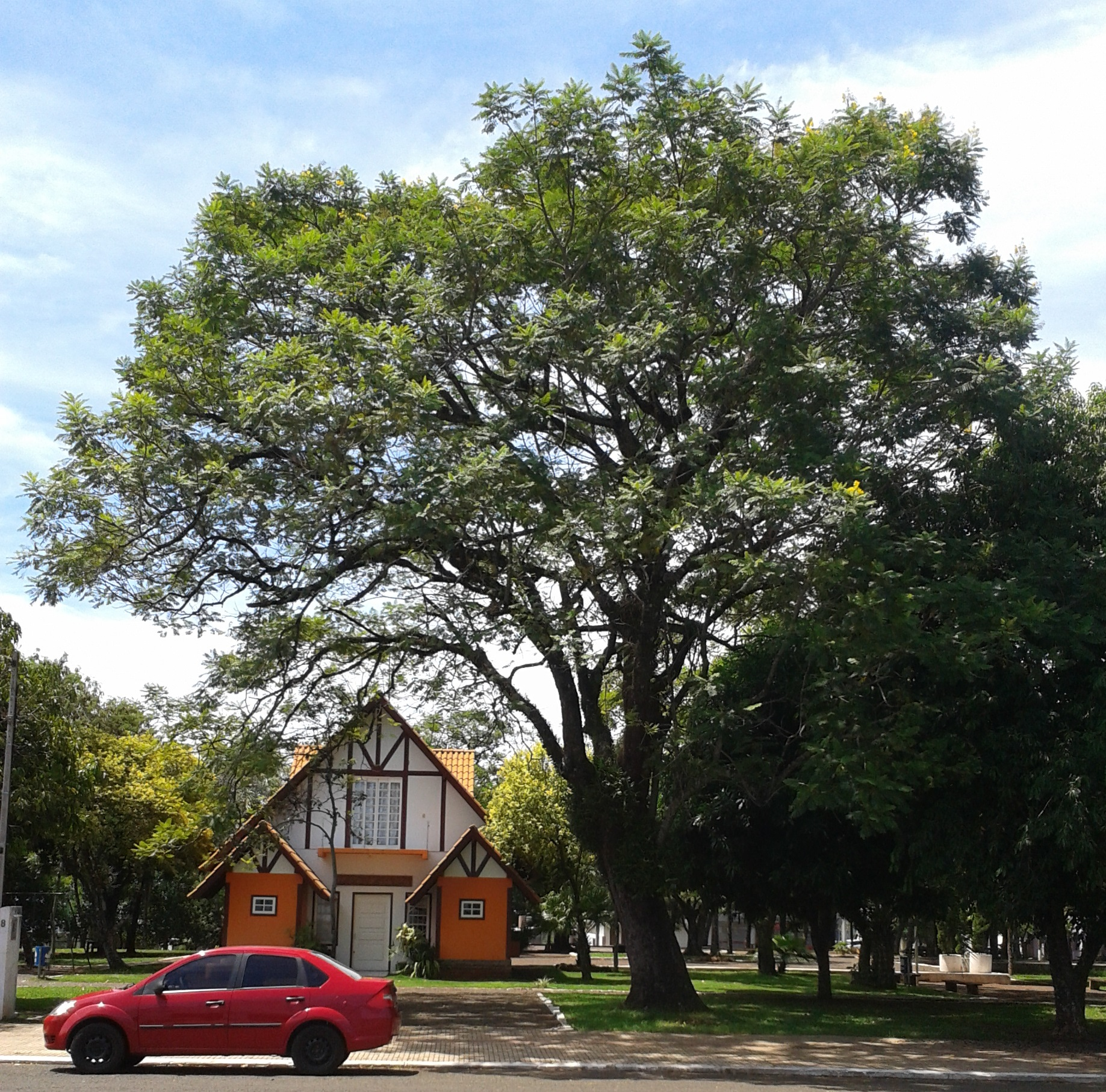
Golden shower in 25 de Julho Square

Crissiumal is part of the Atlantic Forest biome. It lies in the agroecological region of the Upper Uruguay River Valley and the Três Passos sub-region. The vegetation is classified as seasonal deciduous forest. It features a high percentage of species exclusive to the subtropical forest, a relatively low number of tall tree species, and an almost complete absence of epiphytes. Currently, the forest is fragmented into small, scattered patches among crops, primarily maize, wheat, and soybean. The most abundant species of flora belong to the Leguminosae, Boraginaceae, Sapindaceae, and Rutaceae families. Vegetation covers 10 to 20% of the municipality's area, with the remainder occupied by annual crops and pastures. In 2008, forests covered 11,589.15 hectares, with the rest consisting of exposed soil, fields, water bodies, and urban areas. From 1988 to 2008, forest regeneration amounted to 6,271.28 hectares due to the expansion of remaining forest fragments, the emergence of pioneer vegetation in former agricultural areas, and the planting of commercial forests, mainly consisting of Eucalyptus and Pinus trees.

Deforestation from 1988 to 2008 totaled 1,508.04 hectares, occurring in areas now used for agriculture. Among the region's flora species are the silk floss tree (Chorisia speciosa), golden shower (Peltophorum dubium), rosemary (Holocalyx balansae), grapia (Apuleia leiocarpa), cabreúva (Myrocarpus frondosus), and pink ipê (Tabebuia avellanedae). The municipality has no permanent preservation areas, so preservation areas are those mandated by the Brazilian Forest Code, which establishes minimum preservation strips along rivers or watercourses based on their width, as well as around lagoons, springs, hilltops, and slopes with inclines exceeding 45%.

==== Fauna ====
The fauna includes several mammals, various birds, some reptiles, and fish. Notable species in the region include birds such as the caracara (Pyrrhocoma rufiops), roadside hawk (Buteo maguirostris), white-tipped dove (Leptotila verreauxi), red-crested cardinal (Paroaria coronata), rufous hornero (Furnarius rufus), and campo flicker (Colaptes campestris); mammals such as the oncilla (Leopardus tigrinus); crab-eating raccoon (Procyon cancrivorus), Brazilian guinea pig (Cavia aperea), and six-banded armadillo (Euphractus sexcinctus); and reptiles including the Amazon false coral snake (Oxyrhopus rhombifer), racer (Mastigodryas sp.), coral snake (Micrurus sp.), and common lizard (Schreibersii sp.). Six species are threatened, three of which are amphibians. Some fish species spawn in the headwaters of Uruguay River tributaries, such as the Lajeado Grande.

==== Squares ====
- 25 de Julho Square: It is located between Guarita, Caçapava, Dr. Becker, and Palmeiras avenues. During the early days of settlement, settlers' children spent weekends playing amid the arrowleaf sida plants here. The first residents, as well as the Catholic Church, a hotel, and the bus station, were located around it. The park contains 30 species of native, ornamental, and fruit trees.
- Jacob Francisco Nedel Square: Inaugurated in 2006, named in honor of immigrant Jacob Francisco Nedel. It features a playground and a plaque with Jacob's biography.
- Recanto Verde Square: Situated between Santa Rosa Avenue and Horizontina Street, it has a grove of native trees planted by residents and a playground with rustic wooden structures.
- Gervásio Henrique Grün Square: Named after Crissiumal's first road patrolman. At the center stands a fig tree that Gervásio planted, whose branches extend several meters.
- Mini-Square: A small triangular area near the Pioneer Monument roundabout on Avenida das Missões. It features exotic plants, stones, a rustic bench, and a swing.
- Lindolfo Schmidt Square: Located on Avenida das Missões near the Municipal Works Park, named after one of Linha Brasil's pioneer merchants. It displays the first road grader owned by the Crissiumal Municipal Government.
- João Armindo Schaffer Square: In Vila Nova neighborhood, named in honor of a teacher and councilor who lived there.
- Liberdade Square: Located in the Industrial neighborhood.
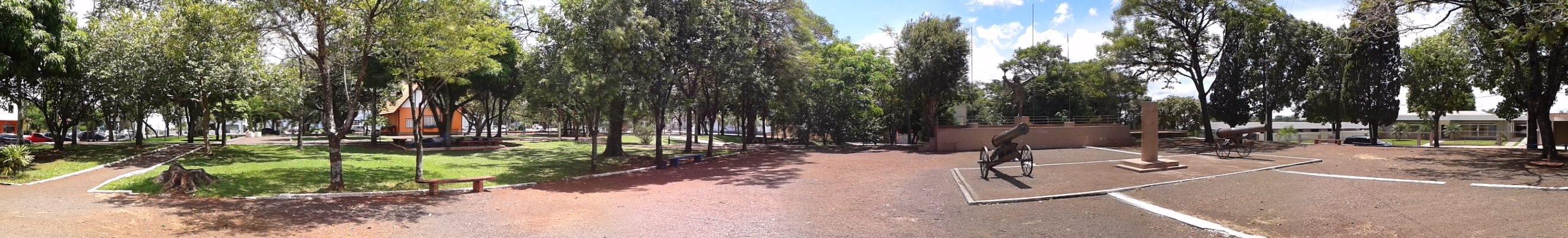
Panorama of 25 de Julho Square

==== Environmental issues ====
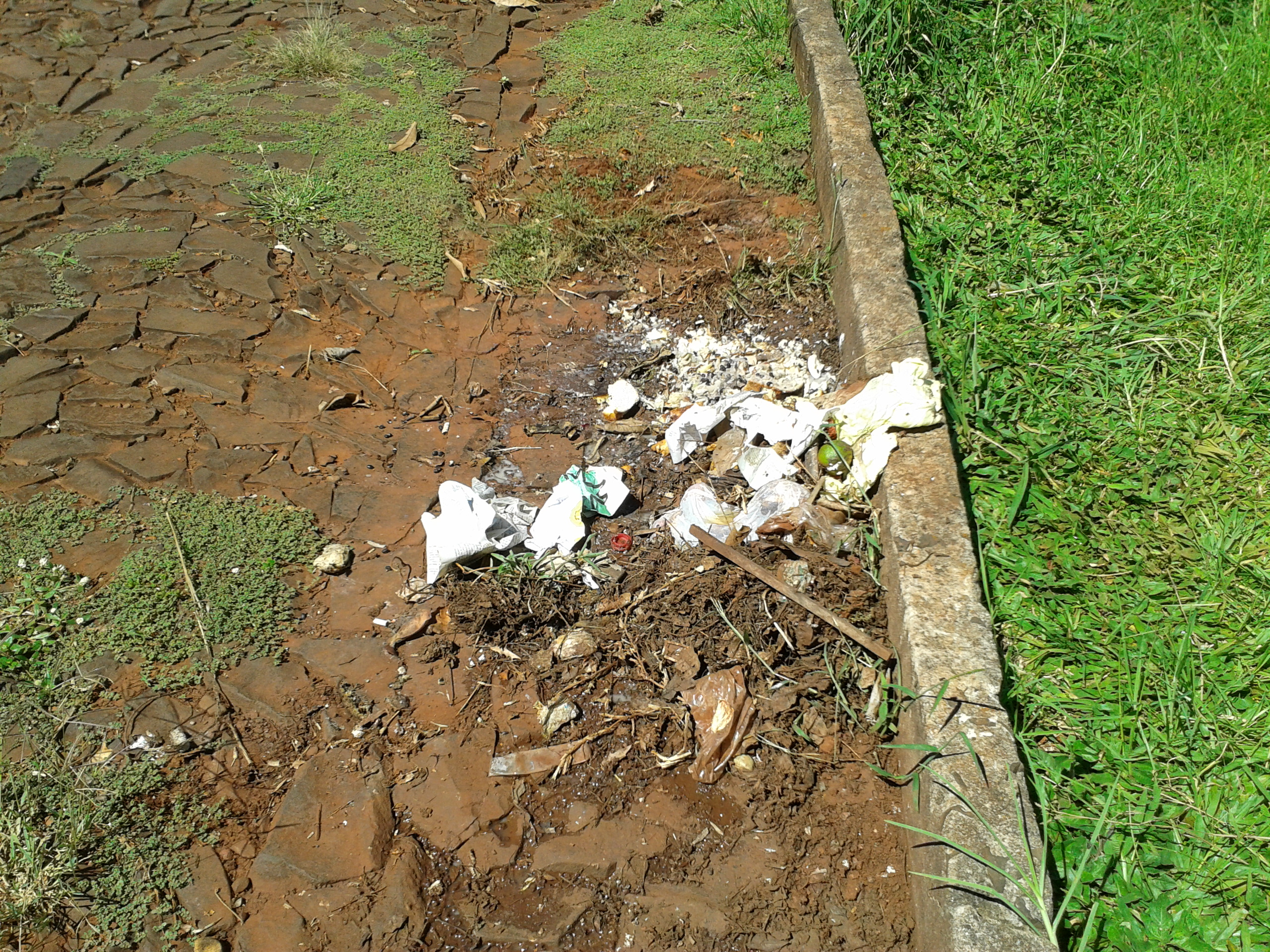
Improperly disposed waste on a public street in Crissiumal. According to the 2010 Demographic Census, 24 households discarded waste in vacant lots or public spaces in the municipality.

According to the Socioeconomic Atlas of Rio Grande do Sul, the main environmental problems in the Uruguay River Basin, which includes Crissiumal, are untreated sewage discharge into watercourses, liquid waste disposal from swine and poultry farming, deforestation, groundwater exploitation that may contaminate deeper water sources, erosion, agricultural soil compaction, soil and water contamination by agrochemicals, recurring droughts and floods, and siltation of water flows. In the Turvo-Santa Rosa-Santo Cristo sub-basin, there is also occupation of permanent preservation areas and a lack of riparian vegetation. Livestock and agriculture, which use large amounts of fertilizers, can disrupt the nitrogen cycle, affecting water quality, and the decomposition of waste such as manure, urine, and feed can pollute air, water, and soil. Among the municipality's anthropogenic activities recorded by the FEPAM, the main ones are swine farming, retail fuel storage/trade (gas stations), pesticide storage, water supply systems with dams, and road transport of hazardous products or waste. An environmental liability exists in the Industrial neighborhood, where homes were built over a former waste dump, still producing odors, gases, and leachate.

=== Climate ===
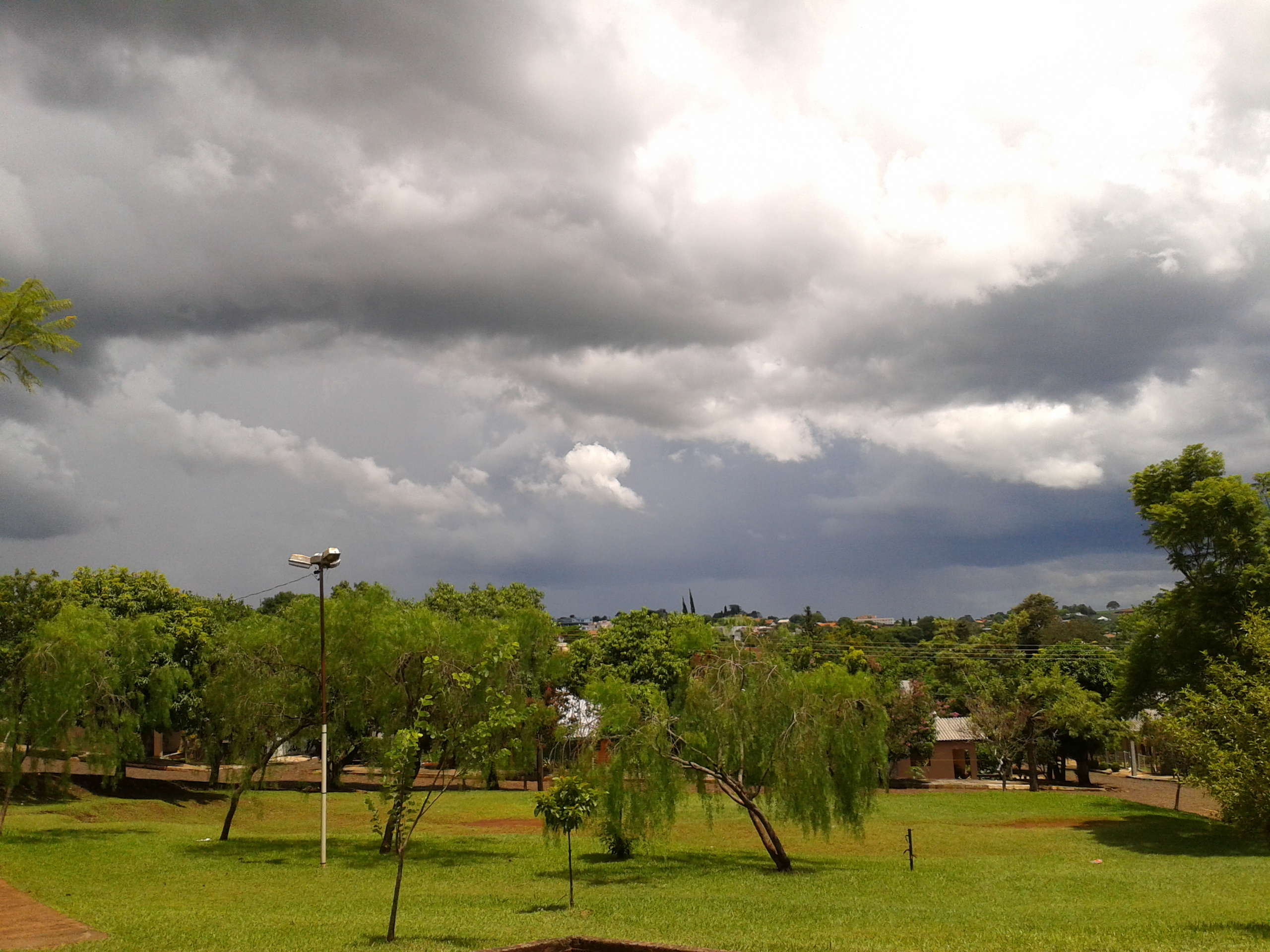
Cloudy day in Crissiumal, seen from the Vila União square.

Crissiumal has a humid subtropical climate. Its location in the southernmost part of the country leads to four well-defined seasons in terms of temperature, with evenly distributed rainfall throughout the year. Summers, from December to March, are very hot, while winters, from June to September, are moderately cold, with minimum temperatures around 9 °C. Maximum winter temperatures range from 18 °C to 20 °C. Spring and fall have mild and pleasant temperatures. The climate is characterized by abundant precipitation, fog formation, and occasional frosts. The average annual temperature is 18 °C, with absolute maximums exceeding 41 °C. The temperature range spans from 0 °C to 38 °C. From June to August, temperatures drop, and severe frosts may occur, a normal phenomenon given due to the latitude and topography. Along the Uruguay River, fog formed by humidity prevents frost, favoring agriculture. Rainfall is heavy and well-distributed, with winter months (July to September) being the wettest. Annual rainfall typically ranges from 1,650 to 2,000 mm. Relative humidity is high, varying from 75% to 85%, with values of 68–85% in summer and spring and 76–90% in fall and winter.

Several weather events, including snow, frost, drought, flooding, strong winds, and hail, have significantly impacted Crissiumal. On August 20 and 21, 1965, the region experienced snowfall. The phenomenon began at ten o'clock on one day and continued into the next, forming snow layers exceeding one meter in some areas. House and shed roofs collapsed, telephone and power lines snapped, water pipes burst, and livestock and wildlife perished. In August 2010, the area saw precipitation of ice pellets, also known as graupel, which, according to meteorologists, is a rare occurrence at lower altitudes. The most severe drought lasted four months, from late 2004 to mid-2005, prompting a declaration of a state of emergency. The drought led to the postponement of the start of classes at two municipal schools and caused the total loss of soybean and maize crops. The most significant flood occurred in 1983 when the Uruguay River reached 25 meters. Another flood took place on June 29, 2014, when the Uruguay River reached 19.77 meters. In 2005, a hailstorm struck the city and several rural areas. During this event, approximately 570 people were left homeless, and over 100 were treated for injuries at the Charity Hospital.

Climate data for Crissiumal
Month	Jan	Feb	Mar	Apr	May	Jun	Jul	Aug	Sep	Oct	Nov	Dec	Year
Mean daily maximum °C (°F)	30.9 (87.6)	30.1 (86.2)	28.0 (82.4)	24.6 (76.3)	21.7 (71.1)	20.4 (68.7)	21.2 (70.2)	23.0 (73.4)	24.9 (76.8)	27.3 (81.1)	29.1 (84.4)	28.8 (83.8)	25.8 (78.5)
Daily mean °C (°F)	24.6 (76.3)	24.0 (75.2)	21.8 (71.2)	18.7 (65.7)	15.9 (60.6)	14.7 (58.5)	15.1 (59.2)	16.6 (61.9)	18.5 (65.3)	20.8 (69.4)	22.4 (72.3)	22.4 (72.3)	19.6 (67.3)
Mean daily minimum °C (°F)	18.4 (65.1)	17.9 (64.2)	15.7 (60.3)	12.8 (55.0)	10.2 (50.4)	9.1 (48.4)	9.0 (48.2)	10.3 (50.5)	12.1 (53.8)	14.3 (57.7)	15.8 (60.4)	16.1 (61.0)	13.5 (56.3)
Average precipitation mm (inches)	153 (6.0)	144 (5.7)	135 (5.3)	157 (6.2)	166 (6.5)	157 (6.2)	127 (5.0)	130 (5.1)	150 (5.9)	182 (7.2)	145 (5.7)	143 (5.6)	1,789 (70.4)
Source: Climate-Data.org

== Demographics ==
The population of Crissiumal in 2016, as estimated by the Brazilian Institute of Geography and Statistics (IBGE), was 14,233 inhabitants, with a population density of 38.89 inhabitants per square kilometer. According to the 2010 Census, 6,903 inhabitants were male and 7,171 were female. The same census reported that 43.48% of the population was urban, with 6,124 inhabitants living in urban areas and 7,960 in rural areas. The life expectancy at birth is 75.11 years, and the infant mortality rate is 8.47 per thousand live births.

The Human Development Index (HDI-M) of Crissiumal is considered high by the United Nations Development Programme (UNDP). The HDI ranges from 0 to 1, with values closer to 0 indicating lower human development and those closer to 1 indicating higher development. In 2010, Crissiumal's HDI was 0.712. Specifically for education, the index value is 0.616, compared to Brazil's national education index of 0.637. The longevity index is 0.835 (compared to Brazil's 0.739), and the income index is 0.702 (compared to Brazil's 0.816). The Gini coefficient, which measures social inequality, is 0.39, where 1.00 represents the highest inequality and 0.00 the lowest. The poverty incidence, as measured by the IBGE, is 17.71%, with a lower limit of 11.56%, an upper limit of 23.87%, and a subjective poverty incidence of 12.82%.

Between 1991 and 2000, Crissiumal's population decreased by 3,003 inhabitants. This decline may be attributed to an emigration flow toward the Metropolitan, North Coast, and Serra regions of Rio Grande do Sul, as between 1995 and 2000, the net migration balance of the COREDE Noroeste Colonial region, to which Crissiumal belonged, was -12,862, while the COREDE regions of Metropolitano Delta do Jacuí, Serra, and Litoral had positive balances ranging from 15,000 to 20,000.

=== Demographic change in Crissiumal ===
Source:

=== Racial composition ===
The IBGE classification by color or race is divided into the following categories: white, brown (pardo), black, yellow, and indigenous. The black population corresponds to the combined total of brown and black populations. Racial or color composition is determined by self-declaration. In 2010, Crissiumal's population consisted of 12,657 whites (89.87%), 1,311 browns (9.31%), and 108 blacks (0.77%). The white population is primarily descended from Germans, Italians, and Poles.

=== Religion ===
Religion in Crissiumal (2010 Census)
1. Roman Catholicism (64.5%)
2. Protestantism (34.7%)
3. No religion (0.36%)
4. Spiritism (0.09%)
5. Jehovah's Witnesses (0.06%)
6. Other (0.32%)

Crissiumal is located in the country with the largest absolute number of Catholics in the world. However, the 1988 Brazilian Constitution guarantees freedom of religion, prohibiting any form of religious intolerance and establishing an official separation of Church and State, making Brazil a secular state. In October 2009, an agreement with the Vatican was approved by the Senate and enacted by the President in February 2010, recognizing the Legal Status of the Catholic Church in Brazil. The project faced criticism from parliamentarians who viewed its approval as undermining the secular state.

Reflecting Crissiumal's cultural diversity, the city is home to a variety of religious expressions. Although it developed within a predominantly Catholic social framework, dozens of different Protestant denominations can now be found in the city. Additionally, the growth of evangelicals has been notable, reaching 34.69% of the population. According to data from the 2010 census conducted by the Brazilian Institute of Geography and Statistics, Crissiumal's population is composed of Catholics (64.48%), Evangelicals (34.69%), Spiritists (0.09%), and Jehovah's Witnesses (0.06%). The percentage of those with no religious affiliation is 0.36%, lower than the national average of 7.3%. Among evangelicals, 3,228 belong to the Evangelical Lutheran Church of Brazil, 677 to the Brazil for Christ Pentecostal Church, 310 to the Assemblies of God, and 179 to the Foursquare Church.

== Politics ==
Under the 1988 Brazilian Constitution, Crissiumal is part of a federative republic with a presidential system. This form of government was inspired by the American model, though Brazil's legal system follows the Roman-Germanic tradition of positive law. Municipal administration is carried out by the executive and legislative branches, with all members of these branches directly elected.

In Crissiumal, the Executive Power is represented by the mayor and a cabinet of secretaries, in accordance with the model outlined by the Federal Constitution. However, the Municipal Organic Law stipulates that public administration must provide the population with effective tools to exercise participatory democracy. The city's first mayor was Lauro Pedro Thomas, elected on February 20, 1955, and sworn in on February 28, 1955. Over thirteen terms, eleven mayors have served Crissiumal. The mayor until 2020 was Roberto Bergmann, from the Brazilian Democratic Movement Party (PMDB), elected in a supplementary election in 2015, re-elected in the 2016 Brazilian municipal elections, and sworn in the following year. He received 5,351 valid votes, representing 55.20% of the votes in the first round. As the municipality has fewer than 200,000 voters, there was no second round.

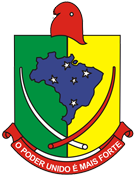
Coat of arms of the Municipal Legislative Power.

The Legislative Power is exercised by the municipal chamber, composed of 9 councilors, elected for four-year terms (in compliance with Article 29 of the Constitution of Brazil, which sets a maximum of nine councilors for municipalities with up to 15,000 inhabitants). The chamber is responsible for drafting and voting on fundamental laws for administration and the Executive, particularly the participatory budgeting (Budget Guidelines Law). As of 2017, the Chamber consists of three councilors from the Brazilian Democratic Movement Party (PMDB), two from the Social Democratic Party (PSD), one from the Communist Party of Brazil (PC do B), one from the Brazilian Labour Party (PTB), one from the Progressive Party (PP), and one from the Brazilian Socialist Party (PSB). The local Judicial Power is exercised through the Crissiumal Court District, which serves the municipalities of Crissiumal and Humaitá, and was established by State Law No. 2,666, of August 6, 1955, separating from the Três Passos court district. Crissiumal is also the seat of the 91st electoral zone, covering the municipalities of Crissiumal, Humaitá, and Sede Nova. According to the Superior Electoral Court, the municipality had approximately 11,506 voters in 2016.

Municipal councils also operate in Crissiumal, complementing the legislative process and the work of municipal secretariats. These councils, mandatorily composed of representatives from various sectors of organized civil society, address diverse issues. The following municipal councils are currently active: Municipal Council for Agricultural, Livestock, and Irrigation Policy, Women's Rights Council (COMDIM), Environmental Protection Council (COMPAM), Housing Council, Culture Council, Elderly Council, School Transportation Council, Environmental Sanitation Council (CONSAM), Anti-Drug Council, Sports Council (CMD), Children's and Adolescents' Rights Council (COMDICA), Health Council (CMS), Traffic Council, Transparent Management Council, and Education Council.

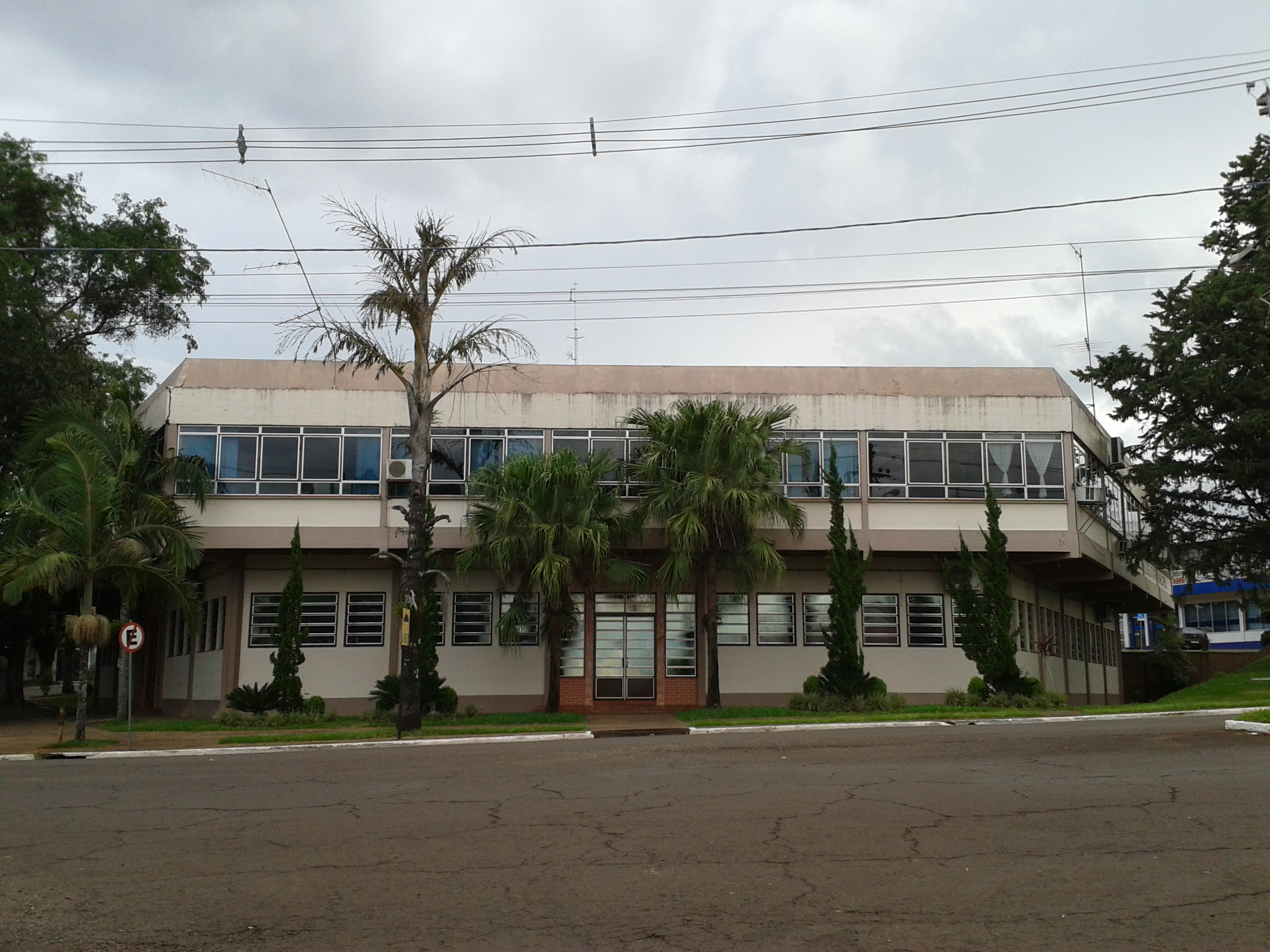
The Hexagon, headquarters of the Crissiumal City Hall and the Crissiumal City Council.

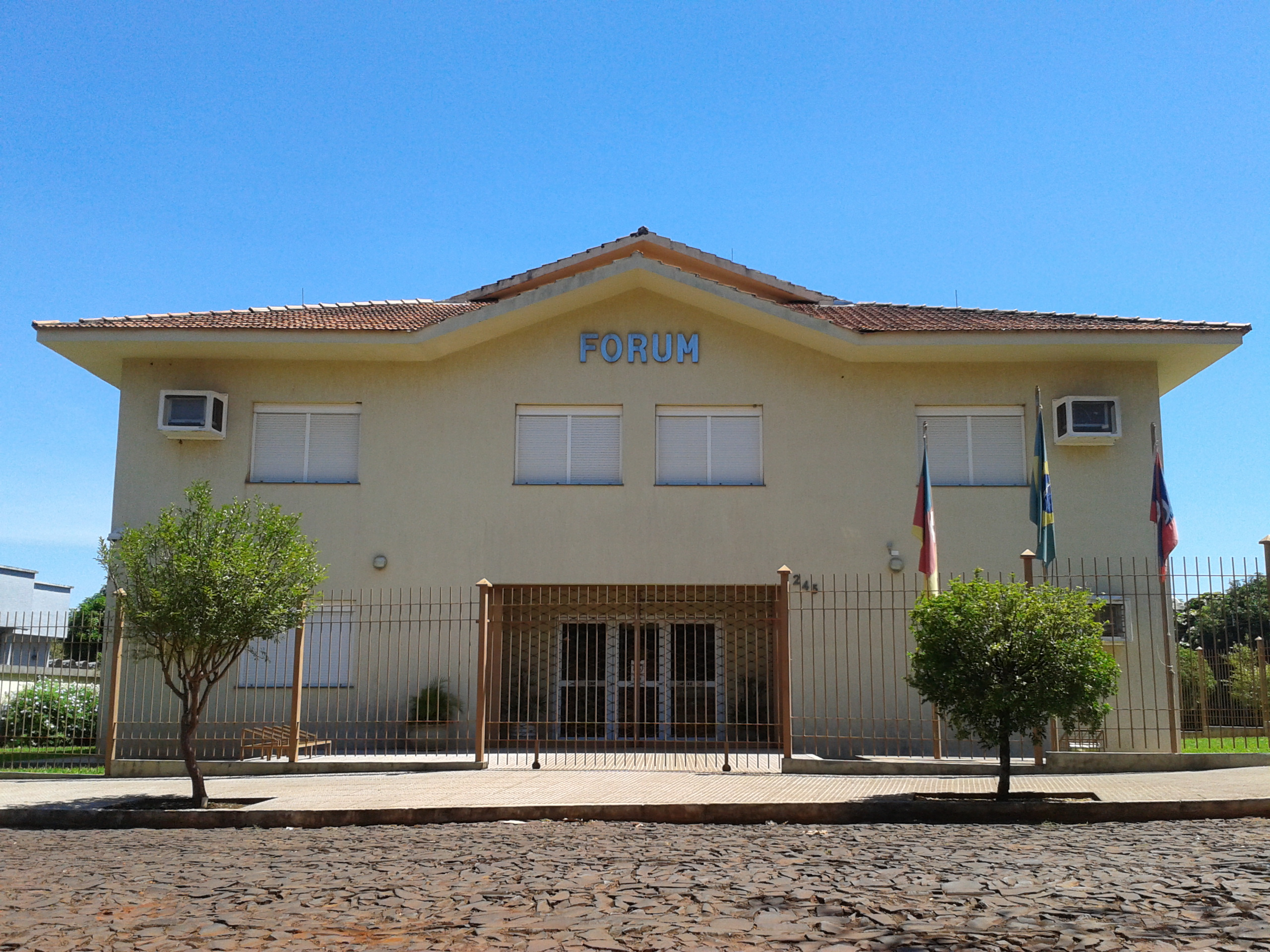
Headquarters of the Judicial Power in Crissiumal.

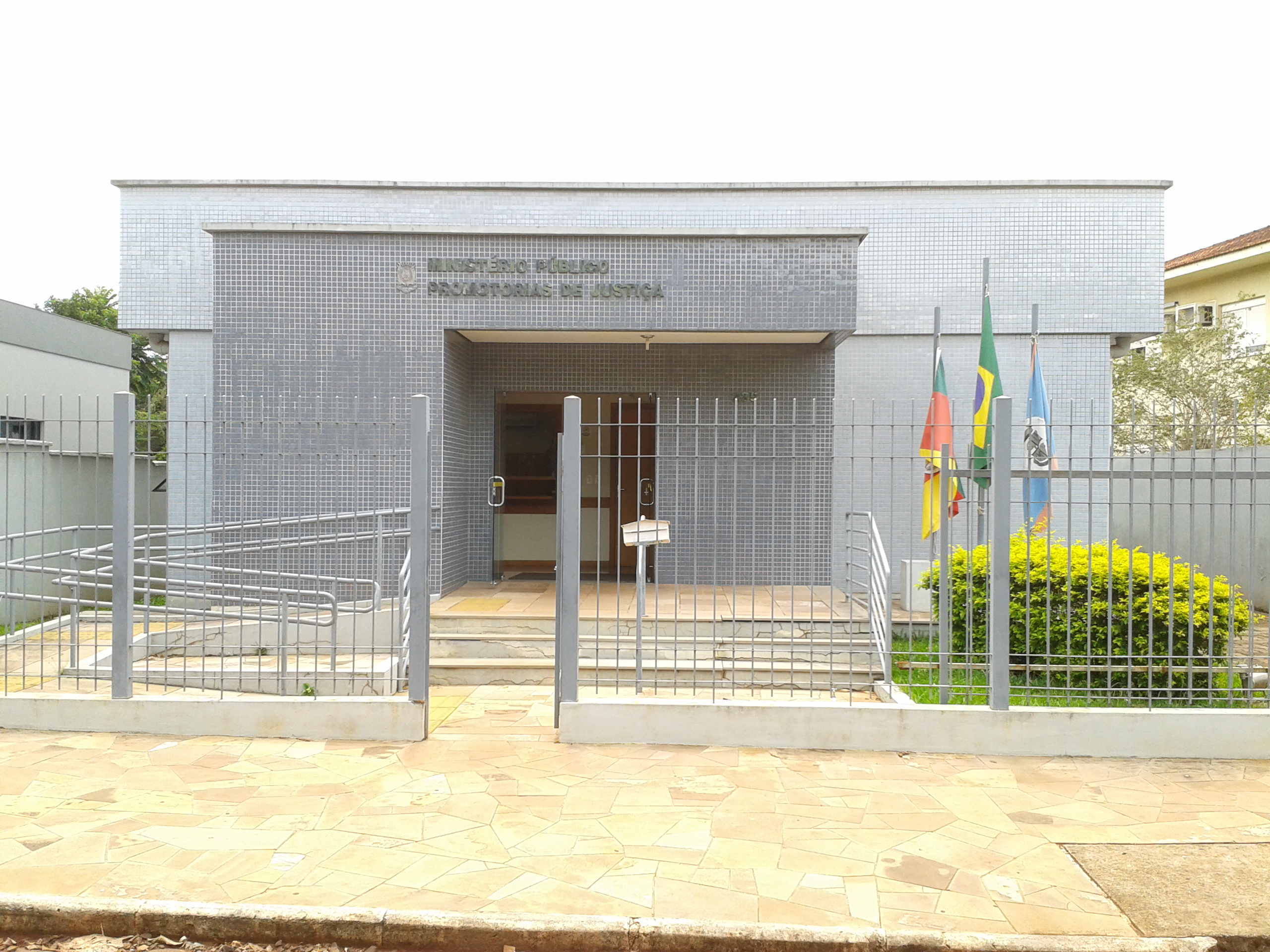
State Public Prosecutor's Office in Crissiumal.

=== Law ===
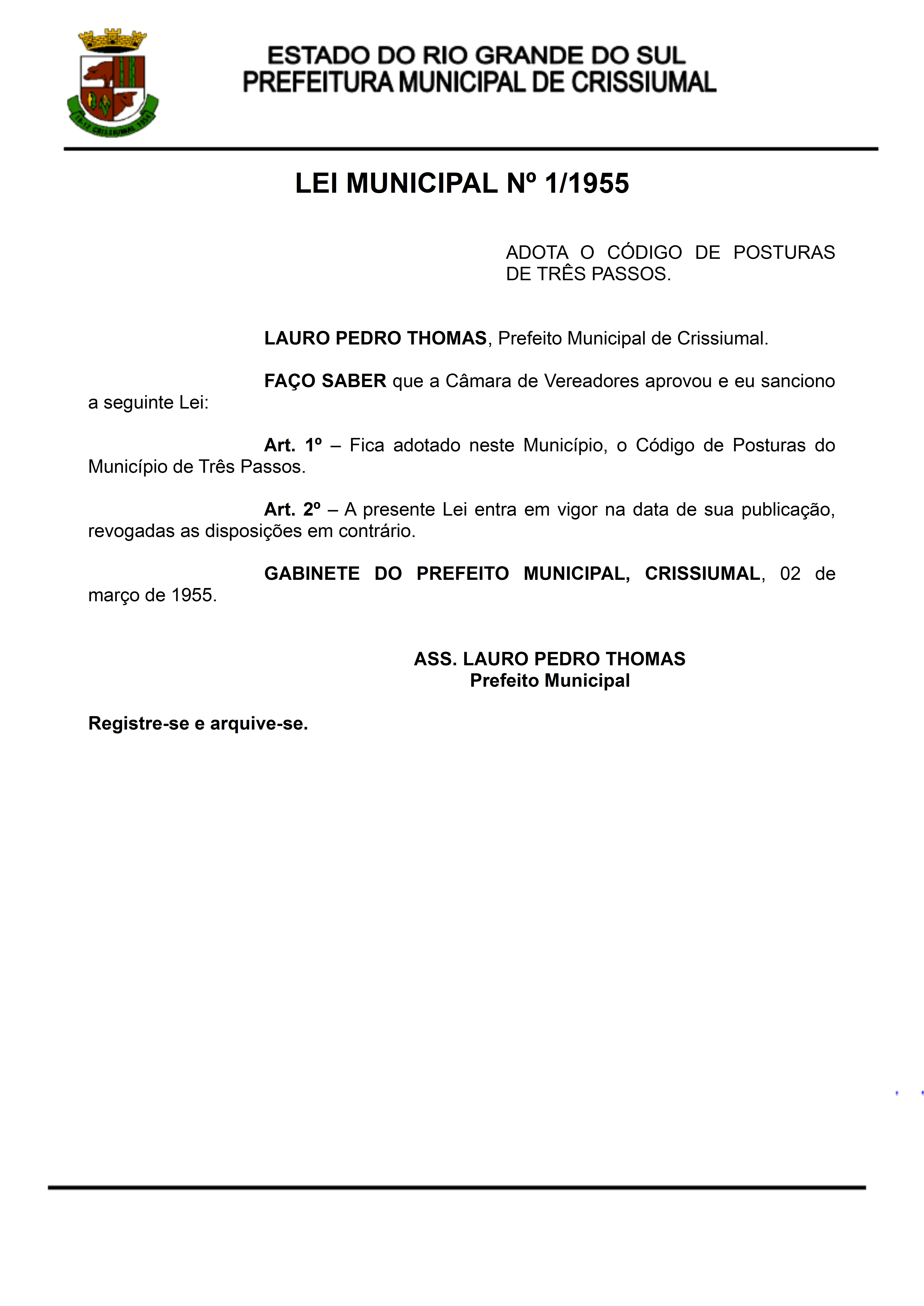
Municipal Law No. 1 of March 2, 1955.

Brazilian law is based on the tradition of the civil code, part of the Romano-Germanic legal system. Thus, civil law concepts prevail over common law practices. Most of Brazilian legislation is codified, although non-codified statutes form a substantial part of the system, playing a complementary role. The legal system is grounded in the 1988 Federal Constitution, enacted on October 5, 1988, which serves as Brazil's fundamental law. Municipalities have autonomy to draft their Organic Law and other laws, but this legislative autonomy is limited by the principles of the Federal Constitution and the provisions of the State Constitution to which they belong. The Organic Law is a kind of municipal constitution and must be voted on in two rounds with a minimum interval of ten days and approved by two-thirds of the Municipal Chamber members. Crissiumal's current Organic Law was enacted on November 25, 2003.

The municipality is responsible for preparing its annual budget, multi-year plan, and budget guidelines law, establishing construction regulations, subdivisions, street layouts, and urban zoning, regulating the use of public spaces, overseeing public transportation and taxi services, and regulating the posting of posters and advertisements. According to the Supreme Federal Court, municipalities have the authority to create laws setting the operating hours of commercial establishments, environmental laws within their local interest, and laws extending free urban public transportation. Municipalities are also tasked with drafting the Municipal Tax Code, which establishes rules for taxes, fees, and contributions within their jurisdiction, including the IPTU, the ISS, the ITBI, service fees, police service fees, and the special assessment tax.

=== Symbols ===
The symbols of Crissiumal are the flag, the coat of arms, and the anthem. The coat of arms and flag were established as symbols by Municipal Law No. 472, of December 28, 1977. The coat of arms is a Portuguese shield divided by a black cross, symbolizing the arrival of Jesuits and Spaniards in the municipal territory. In one section of the shield is a cluster of bamboo, which gave the municipality its name, and in another, a bovine specimen, reflecting the importance of cattle breeding to the municipality. Below the shield is a ribbon with the inscription 18/12 - Crissiumal - 1955, and above it is a crown with three towers. The flag's colors are red, representing the tenacity and work ethic of its people, blue, symbolizing the sky that covers the municipality with hope, and white, conveying a message of faith from its inhabitants. The Crissiumal anthem was created through a contest organized by the Culture Center. The first stanza of the anthem describes the formation of the first settlement in Crissiumal:

"Amid forests, bamboos, and wilderness,
A new settlement opened in clearings,
Treading the northwest region,
Crissiumal, beautiful and strong, emerged."

== Subdivisions ==
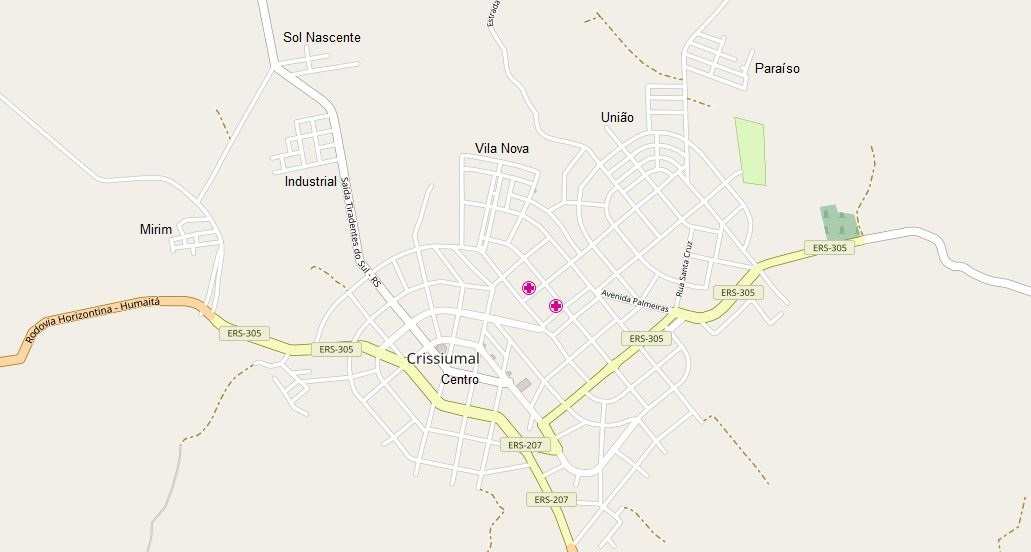
Map of the urban area of Crissiumal

According to Crissiumal's Municipal Organic Law, its territory is divided into three categories: the Urban Perimeter, encompassing the city; the urban circumscription, comprising Districts and neighborhoods; and the Rural Zone, consisting of rural properties and smallholdings. According to Crissiumal's Master Plan, the municipality is divided into Macro-zones. Macro-zoning establishes rules for territorial organization and aims to define guidelines for the use of territorial planning and land use and occupation zoning instruments. The macro-zones include urban macro-zones, rural macro-zones, a tourism macro-zone, and a special macro-zone.

The urban macro-zones consist of the consolidated urban macro-zone, formed by the urban perimeter of the municipal seat, where the majority of the urban population is concentrated, and the controlled-use urban macro-zone, comprising localities considered urban districts of the seat, Esquina Gaúcha, Vista Nova, Lajeado Grande, and Planalto. The rural macro-zones are characterized by areas suitable for agricultural and livestock activities and other primary sector activities. The rural macro-zones include São Sebastião, Esquina Gaúcha, Três Ilhas, Vista Alegre, Esquina Uruguai, Linha Brasil, Alto Crissiumal, Boa Esperança, Bela Vista Schmidt, Bela Vista Brem, São Vicente, and Vila Bender. The tourist macrozone is the area designated for tourism. Residential use, tourism, leisure, accommodation facilities, commerce, services, and tourism support are encouraged there. The special macro-zone corresponds to the industrial area.

== Economy ==
According to 2014 data from the IBGE, Crissiumal had a Gross Domestic Product (GDP) of 268,333 thousand reais, of which 17,132 thousand were taxes, net of subsidies, on products. The per capita GDP was R$18,744.87 in 2014.

Crissiumal's GDP in 2014 compared to other municipalities in Rio Grande do Sul
1st	Porto Alegre	R$63,990,644
2nd	Caxias do Sul	R$22,376,338
154th	Crissiumal	R$268,333
497th	Benjamin Constant do Sul	R$26,005

According to the IBGE, in 2014, the city had 1,021 commercial establishments and 2,687 workers, with 2,206 being salaried employees. Salaries and other compensations totaled 40,182 thousand reais, with an average monthly salary of 1.8 minimum wages across the municipality.

GDP evolution of Crissiumal

(in millions of reais)

=== Primary sector ===
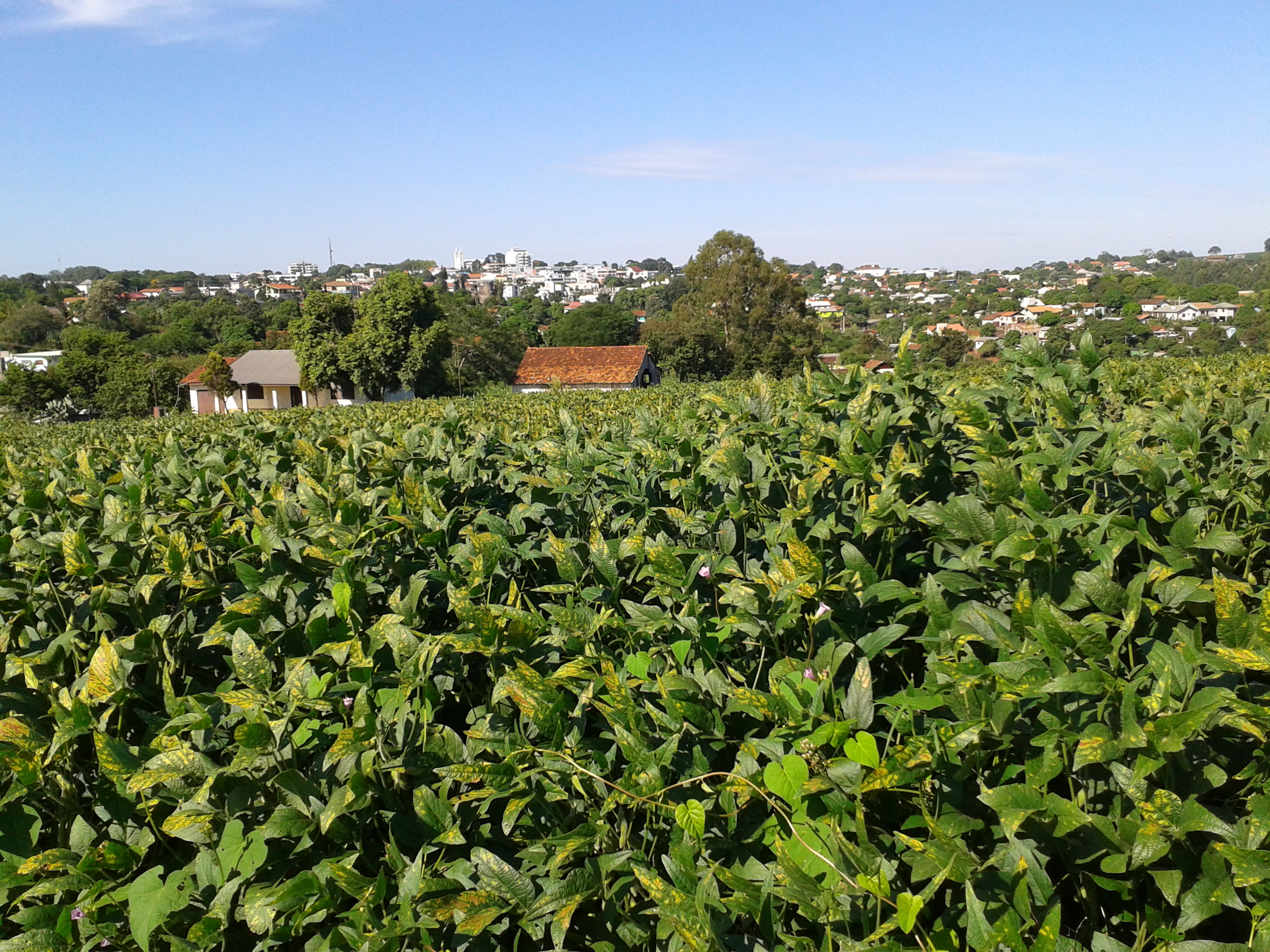
Soybeans are the main temporary crop in Crissiumal. In the foreground, a soybean plantation, and in the background, a view of the city.

In Crissiumal, family farming is a tradition, and some farmers still use hoes, animal-drawn plows, sickles, carts, and threshers. However, modernization has introduced tractors, planters, harvesters, and other machinery. In livestock farming, two programs support this activity: Via Lácteo, which offers courses, financial assistance, and guidance to dairy producers, and the Criar Program, which assists pig farmers with land leveling, sand, and gravel for constructing pig breeding facilities. Of the city's total GDP, 68,456 thousand reais is the gross value added by agriculture in 2014. According to the IBGE, in 2015, the municipality had a herd of 27,200 cattle, 43,000 pigs, 138 horses, 18 goats, 566 sheep, 23,000 chickens, and 300 quails. In 2015, the city produced 30,000 thousand liters of milk from 10,000 cows. Additionally, 350,000 dozen chicken eggs, 10,000 kilograms of honey, and 60 kilograms of wool from sheep were produced. In temporary agriculture, the main crops produced in 2015 were soybeans (25,920 tons), corn (17,991 tons), wheat (5,775 tons), and tobacco (1,440 tons). The municipality's silviculture produced 6,500 cubic meters of firewood from eucalyptus, occupying 750 hectares, and was the only product of this activity in 2015. The 2006 Agricultural Census recorded 2,615 agricultural establishments with a productive area of 32,020 hectares, including 2,556 individual owners (31,434 hectares), 20 personal partnerships or consortia (243 hectares), 20 corporations (218 hectares), and 4 cooperatives (14 hectares).

=== Secondary sector ===
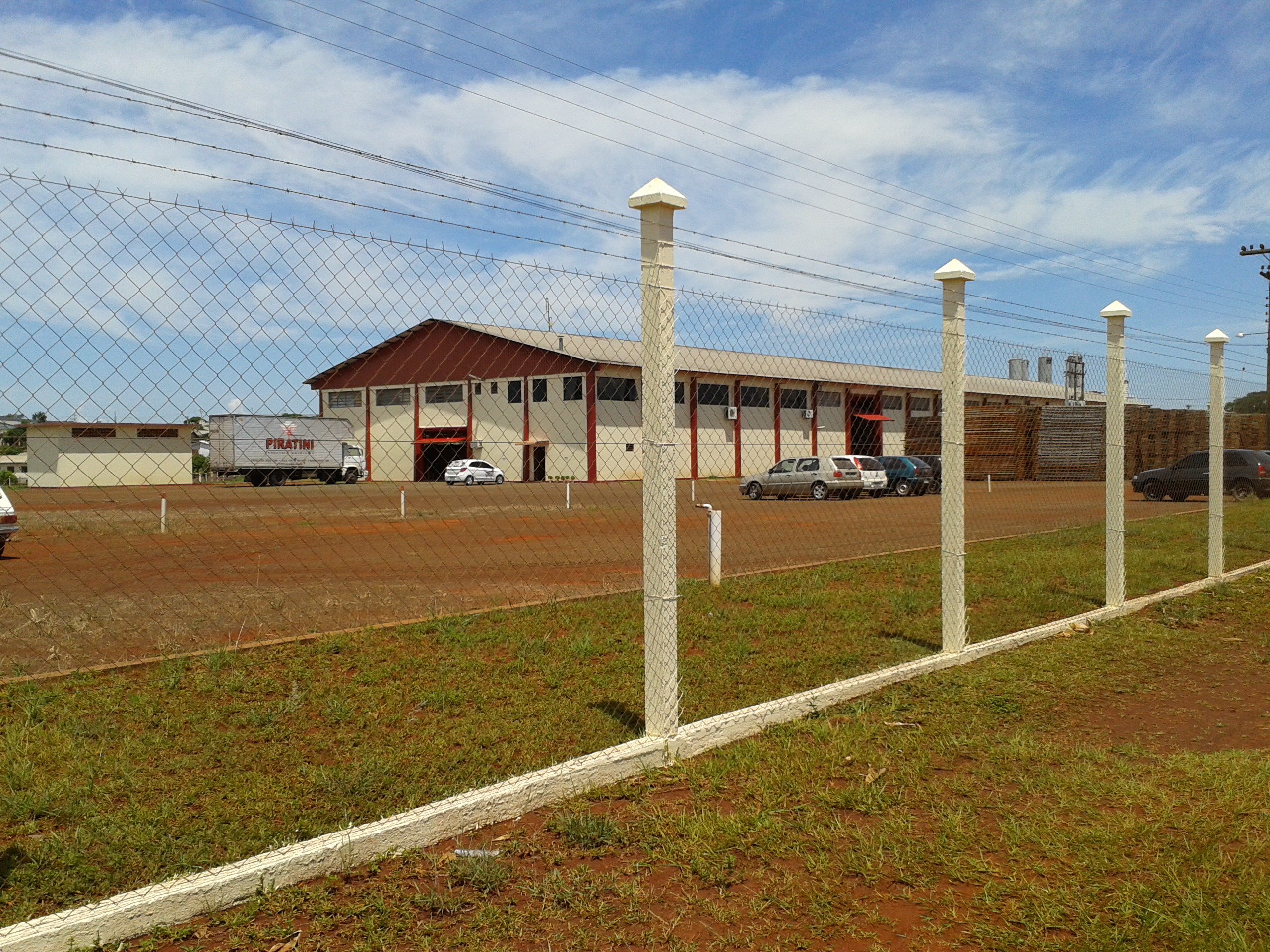
Furniture industry.

The secondary sector of the economy transforms products from the primary sector and includes industries, construction, and energy generation. In 2014, 31,333 thousand reais of the municipal GDP came from the gross value added by industry, representing 10.2% of the total value added in the municipality. In 2015, Crissiumal had 90 manufacturing industries, of which 85 were micro-enterprises, three were small enterprises, and two were medium and large enterprises. In the same year, there were also 41 micro-enterprises in construction. In 1999, a program called Pacto Fonte Nova was established to support small rural producers in producing raw materials, agro-industrializing, and marketing food products, resulting in the creation of 44 agro-industries and 250 direct jobs since that year. These agro-industries receive subsidies for infrastructure investment and environmental licensing through a municipal program. Seventy percent of agro-industry products are sold in local markets or used for school meals. In addition to agro-industries, the municipality has industries in footwear, furniture, metallurgy, and dairy production. In May 2017, the first photovoltaic energy generation system was installed in a rural property in Vila Planalto through an initiative by EMATER and the Municipal Agriculture Secretariat.

=== Tertiary sector ===
The tertiary sector encompasses services such as commerce, education, healthcare, tourism, and banking. In 2014, 94,122 thousand reais of the municipal GDP came from service provision. The tertiary sector is a significant contributor to Crissiumal's GDP, accounting for 60% of the value added in 2014. In that year, Crissiumal had 656 service companies, including 633 micro-enterprises, 22 small enterprises, and one medium and large enterprise. The Crissiumal Company, founded on September 1, 1939, and renamed Viação Ouro e Prata in 1948, is based in the municipality.

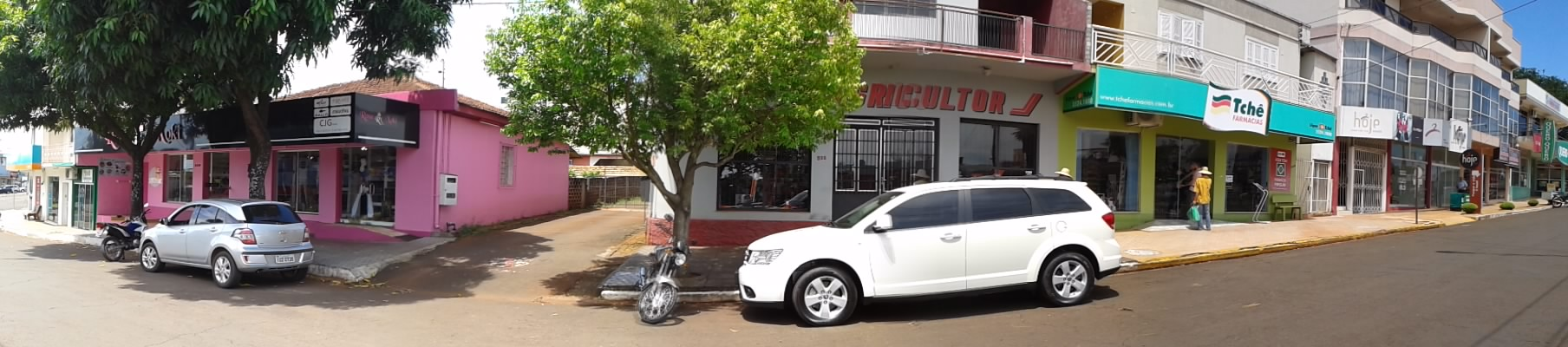
Tertiary sector companies on Presidente Castelo Branco Avenue.

=== Tourism ===
Crissiumal is part of the tourist route called Rota do Yucumã. Located in northwestern Rio Grande do Sul, from the border with Argentina and the border with Santa Catarina to the Gaucho Middle Plateau, the Rota do Yucumã comprises 30 municipalities and includes, in addition to the Yucumã Falls, rural tourism itineraries, parks and resorts, museums, agro-industries, and monuments. The Pacto Fonte Nova Agroindustrial Development Program gave rise to the Mundo Colonial tourist route, attracting thousands of visitors. Since 2002, the route has been visited by over 250 excursions from the states of Rio Grande do Sul, Santa Catarina, Paraná, and Mato Grosso. This route offers ecological trails, resorts, inns, and dishes from the cuisine of Italian and German immigrants.

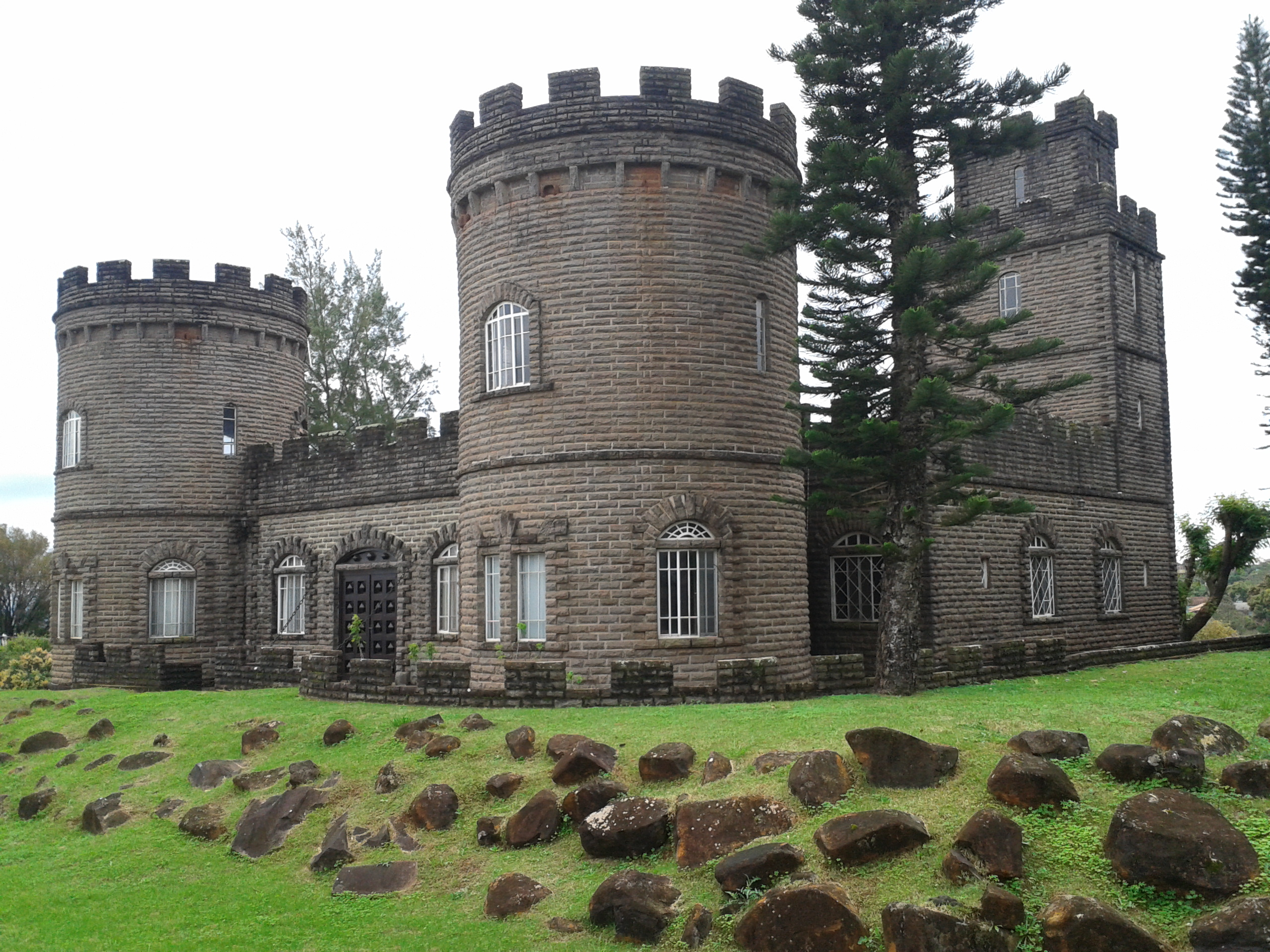
Castle in Crissiumal.

Other significant tourist attractions in the municipality include:

- Castle: A private residence of the Bonotto family, built with stones and featuring European medieval architectural lines, it has four towers and was constructed over 12 years, starting in 1970.
- Pioneer Monument: Also known as the Iron Horse, this iron monument was handcrafted from scrap metal by sculptor Paulo de Siqueira in 1984, in tribute to the pioneers who settled the municipality. It depicts a family arriving in new lands during the colonization era and is located between Palmeiras Avenue and Vitório Dezorzi Street.
- Três Santos Mártires das Missões Church: Inaugurated in 1964 by Father Inácio Lotário Rauber, it was named in honor of the martyrdom of missionaries Roque González, Alfonso Rodríguez, and João de Castilhos on November 15, 1628.
- Três Ilhas Resort: Located on the Uruguay River, approximately 25 km from the municipal seat, it offers infrastructure for camping and summer vacations.
- 25 de Julho Square: Also known as Matriz Square, it was named in homage to immigrants, as July 25 is Immigrant Day. Initially named Valzumiro Dutra until its demolition, it was later called Getúlio Vargas Square and then 25 de Julho Square. The square houses the Soldier Monument and the Artisan House.

== Urban infrastructure ==
Crissiumal has robust infrastructure. In 2010, there were 4,902 housing units, including apartments, houses, and rooms. Of these, 3,903 were owned properties, with 3,499 fully paid (71.38%), 404 under payment (8.24%), 632 rented (12.89%), 348 were provided, with 61 by employers (1.24%) and 287 provided otherwise (5.85%), and 19 were occupied in other ways (0.39%). The municipality has treated water, electricity, urban cleaning, fixed telephony, and mobile telephony. In 2010, 81.13% of households were served by the general water supply network, and 63.12% had garbage collection.

=== Education ===
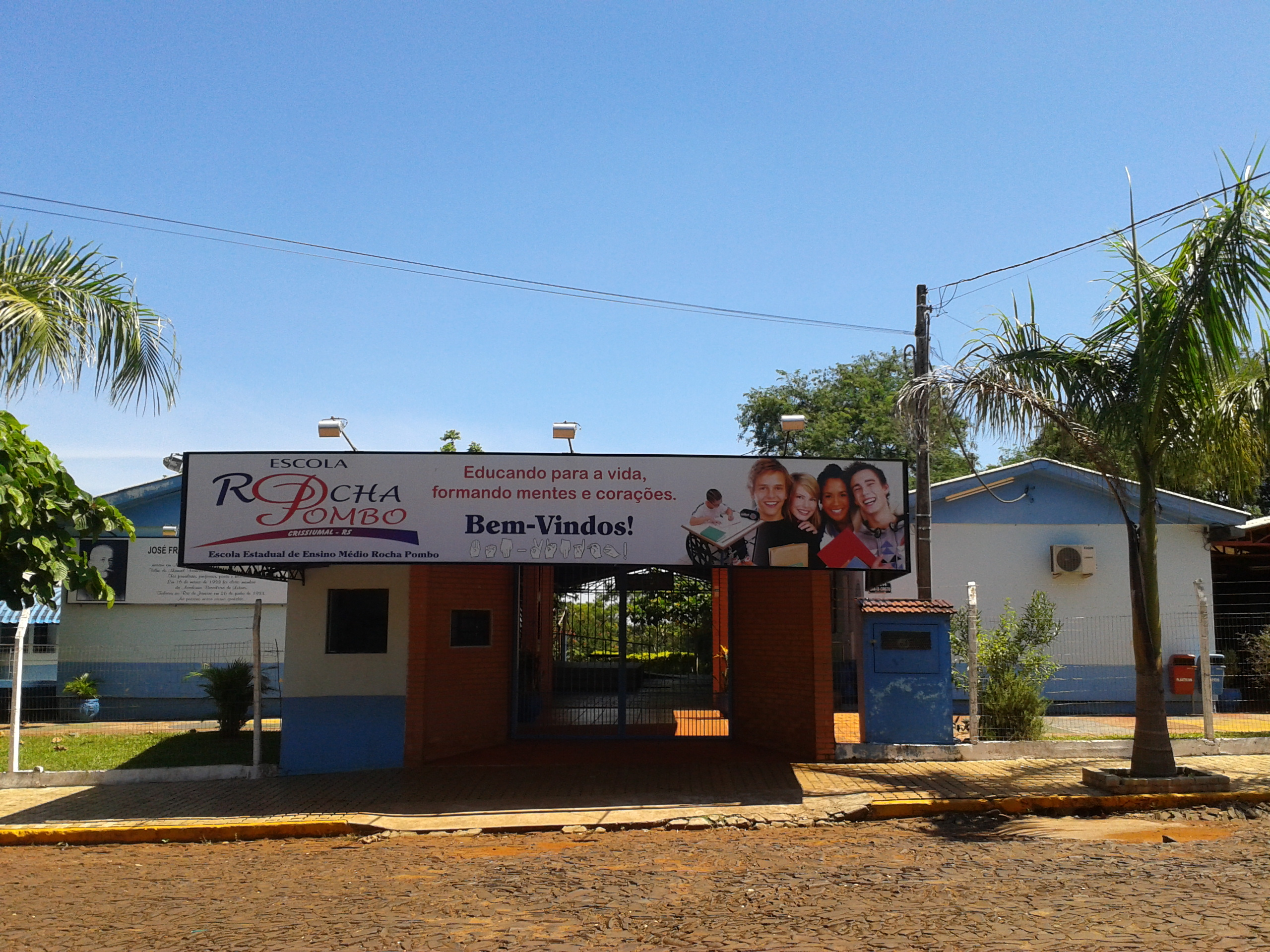
Rocha Pombo State High School. This school achieved an average score of 463.67 in the 2015 ENEM. The highest average in the municipality was achieved by Ponche Verde State High School with 516.56.

The Federal Constitution and the Law of Guidelines and Bases of National Education (LDB) mandate that municipalities manage and organize their respective education systems. The new constitution allocates 25% of municipal revenue from taxes and transfers to education. Public education initiatives include projects addressing specific deficiencies, such as student transportation assistance and continuing education courses for education professionals. In 2015, education in the municipality was provided through six municipal preschools with 26 teachers and 238 enrollments, 16 elementary schools (6 municipal with 773 enrollments and 54 teachers, and 10 state-run with 737 enrollments and 85 teachers). There are also two state high schools with 435 enrollments and 45 teachers. Additionally, the Crissiumal Association for the Welfare of Minors (ABEMEC) serves over 250 children and adolescents in after-school programs at ABEMEC headquarters, Núcleo Bairro Paraíso, and Núcleo Vila Planalto. Founded in 1976, this institution offers guitar, crafts, carpentry, lawn mowing, weaving, shoe shining, and computer classes. Special education is provided at the Lar do Carinho Special Education School of APAE, established in 1979. The city is also home to a distance learning campus of the Universidade Norte do Paraná.

The Basic Education Development Index (Ideb) in Crissiumal has improved since its inception in 2005, when it was 4.5 for the early years of elementary education and 4.1 for the final years. By 2015, these figures had risen to 6.3 and 5.1, respectively, although the final years' index fell short of the municipal target of 5.3. Regarding student learning in 2015, 75% of fifth-year students and 55% of ninth-year students in public schools achieved adequate proficiency in reading and text interpretation. In mathematics, 61% of fifth-year students and 29% of ninth-year students in public schools demonstrated adequate problem-solving skills. The "education" component of the HDI in the municipality reached 0.616 in 2010, considered a medium level according to the standards of the United Nations Development Programme (UNDP), while the literacy rate, as reported by the 2010 IBGE census, was 95.22% (implying an illiteracy rate of 4.78%).

=== Healthcare ===
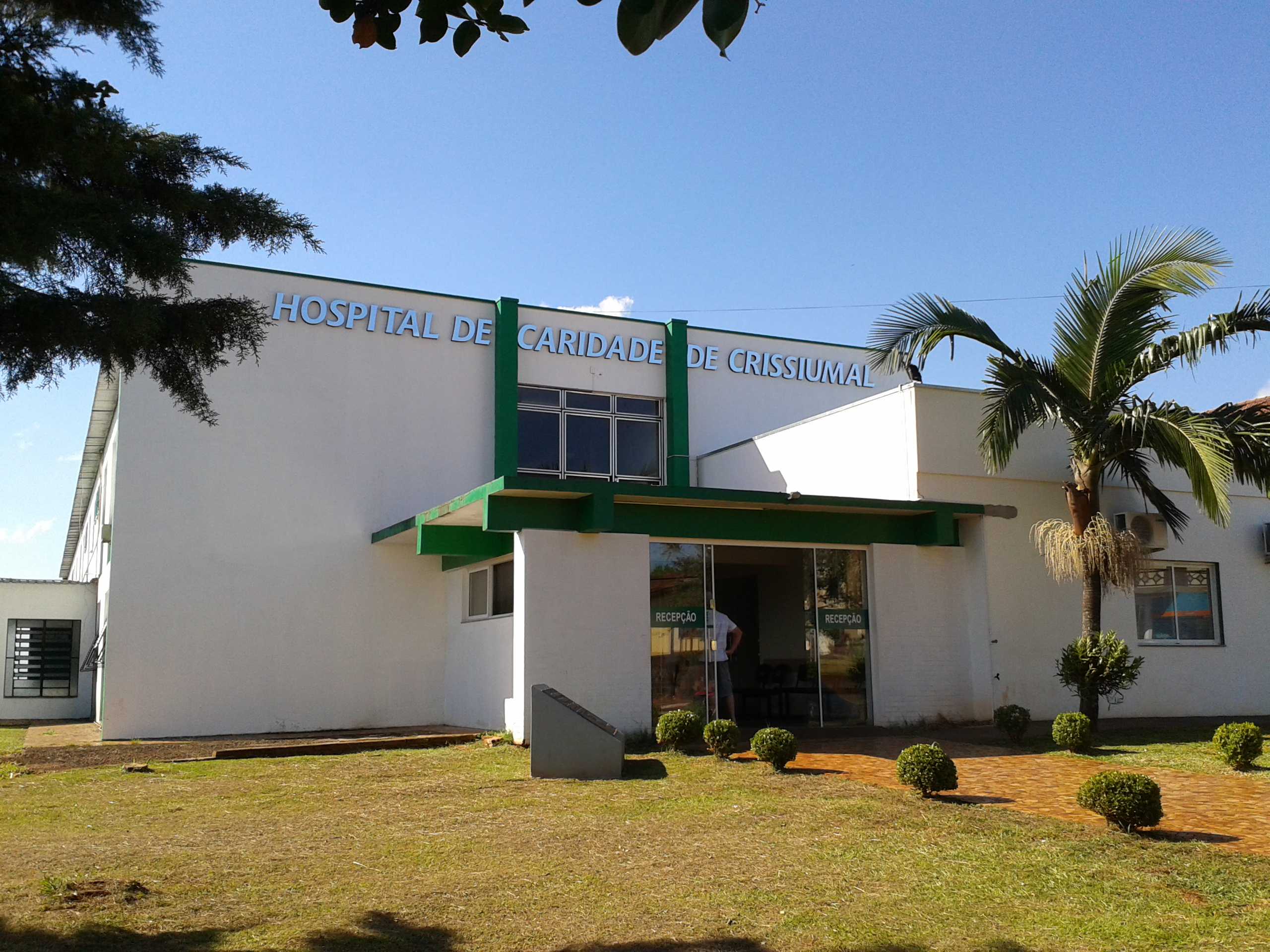
Entrance to the Crissiumal Charity Hospital.

There are seven healthcare facilities in Crissiumal, four public and three private, with 39 beds for hospitalization. The "health" component of the Idese in 2013 was 0.825 in the municipality. Crissiumal is also part of the Northwest Rio Grande do Sul Intermunicipal Health Consortium (CISA), which serves a population of approximately 320,817 people. The Crissiumal Charity Hospital, a non-profit charitable entity, offers specialties in orthopedics/traumatology, general practice, mental health, surgical obstetrics, clinical obstetrics, clinical pediatrics, and psychiatry. This hospital serves as a reference for 10 municipalities in the region, with a population of 60,000, and has 57 beds.

In 2014, 99.4% of children under one year old had up-to-date vaccination records. In 2014, 156 live births were recorded, with an infant mortality rate of 19.2 deaths per 1,000 live births. Of children under two years weighed by the Family Health Program in 2014, 0.4% were malnourished. There were no maternal deaths in 2014, with 0.6% of pregnant women lacking prenatal care and 85.9% having seven or more prenatal visits. The Ministry of Health recommends at least six prenatal visits during pregnancy. In 2014, 66.4% of births were by caesarean section, 33.3% were vaginal deliveries, and 100% of live births were attended by health professionals. The proportion of births to adolescent mothers in 2013 was 10.2%.

From 1991 to 2013, Crissiumal recorded 10 diagnosed cases of AIDS, six among women and four among men, with an incidence rate of 20.9 cases per 100,000 inhabitants in 2013, and no deaths from the disease in 2014. From 2001 to 2012, there were 70 cases of mosquito-borne diseases, including one case of malaria, none of yellow fever, none of leishmaniasis, and 69 of dengue (two in 2002, one in 2007, and 66 in 2010). There were no deaths from mosquito-borne diseases in 2014.

=== Security, violence, and crime ===
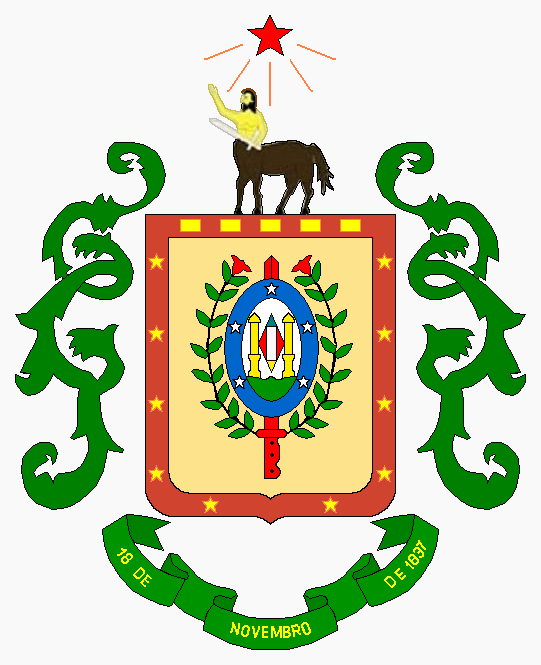
Coat of arms of the Military Brigade of Rio Grande do Sul

A security force present in the municipality is the Rio Grande do Sul Civil Police, primarily responsible for judicial police functions and criminal investigations. Another security agency is the Military Police, maintained by the state government, with multiple duties aimed at community integration and protection, including preventive and ostensible policing, environmental patrols, civil defense, support to the Armed Forces, drug enforcement, search and rescue, professional training for at-risk youth, citizenship promotion, basic hygiene education, firefighting services, and, during summer, lifeguard services.

According to the Rio Grande do Sul Public Security Secretariat, in 2016, Crissiumal recorded two intentional homicides, no traffic-related intentional homicides, 127 thefts, 25 vehicle thefts, seven robberies, no robbery-homicides, one vehicle robbery, no extortion, no extortion through kidnapping, seven frauds, no corruption-related offenses, seven offenses related to weapons and ammunition, three drug-related charges, and two drug trafficking crimes.

In 2012, the Rio Grande do Sul Civil Police conducted an operation named Operação Patriota to combat public fund embezzlement, bidding crimes, and corruption in the purchase of medicines and public works. The six-month investigation executed 25 search and seizure warrants and 13 arrests (five preventive and eight temporary), uncovering over two million reais in misappropriated public funds. The operation involved 110 police officers and resulted in the arrest of the deputy mayor, the former municipal health secretary, the former public works secretary, construction entrepreneurs, and two doctors. One branch of the scheme operated in the healthcare sector, issuing fake requisitions for unperformed tests, billed to an intermunicipal health consortium, with the funds pocketed by group members, including a doctor, laboratories, and municipal administration agents.

=== Water, sanitation, and energy ===
Logo of AGERGS.

The Federal Law No. 11,445 of 2007 established a new framework for basic sanitation, requiring, since then, the provision of potable water supply, sewage systems, urban cleaning with solid waste management, and drainage and management of rainwater in all Brazilian municipalities. The implementation of a basic sanitation plan, economic feasibility analysis, regulatory standards, public hearings, a tariff system, conditions for the sustainability of the economic-financial balance of the contract, and the contract's duration are required. Water supply, sewage, and waste disposal are environmental indicators that also indicate the population's quality of life. The entity responsible for regulating delegated public services, such as sanitation and electricity provided in the state, is the Rio Grande do Sul State Agency for the Regulation of Delegated Public Services (AGERGS), established in 1997, with the objective of ensuring the provision of adequate services.

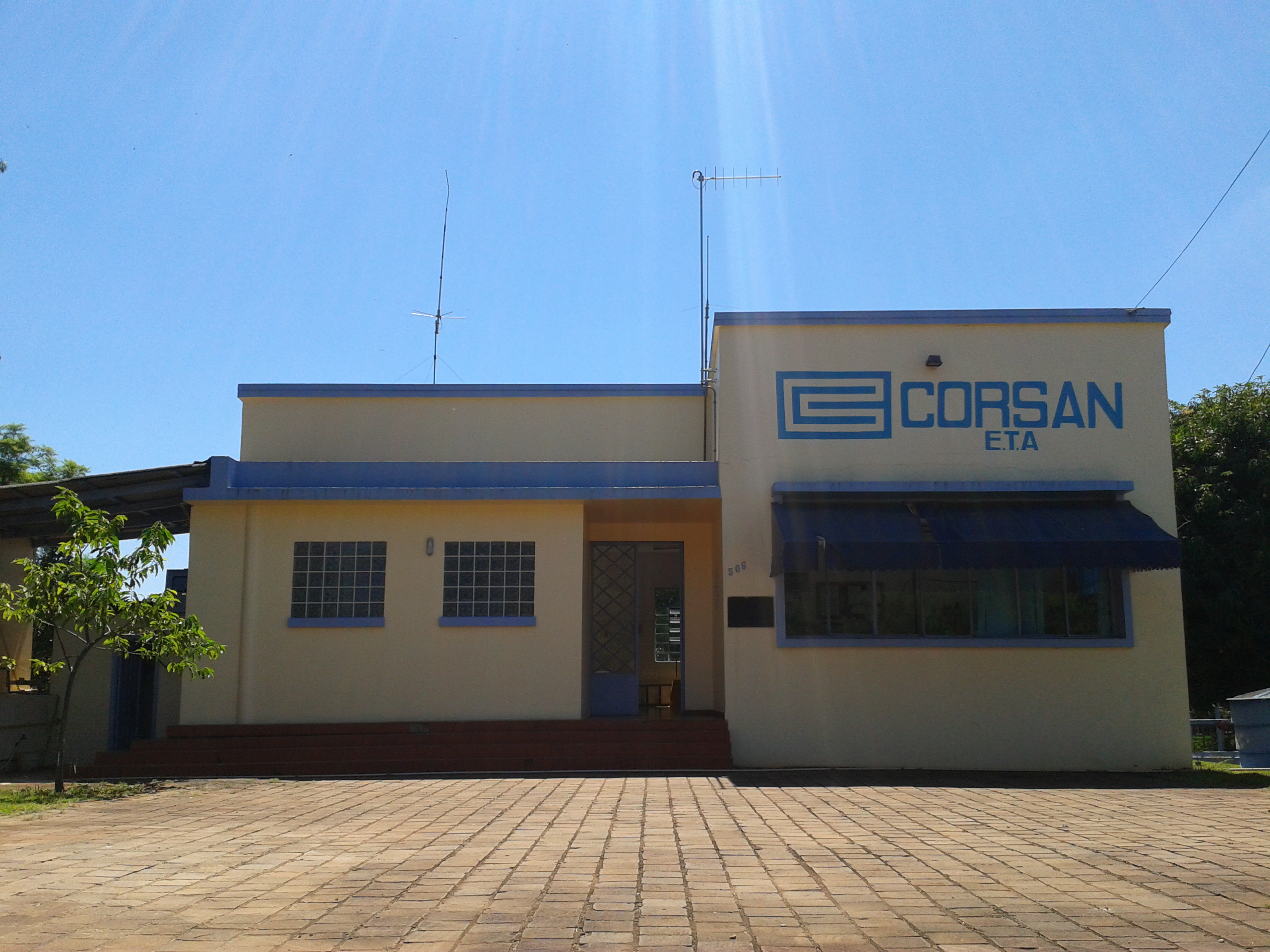
Water Treatment Plant of CORSAN in Crissiumal.

The Water Supply System (SAA) in the urban area is managed by the Rio Grande do Sul Sanitation Company (CORSAN), which operates through an operational and administrative unit called the Crissiumal Sanitation Unit, linked to the Três Passos Sanitation Unit. In Crissiumal, CORSAN supplies water to approximately 3,000 families or users and has a capacity to provide 30 L/s, with the potential to reach up to 90 L/s. The water supplied to the municipality is sourced from the Lajeado Grande River, which, due to its characteristics, requires fewer chemicals for treatment. Water supply in rural areas is the responsibility of the Municipal Government, which delegates the service to residents' associations and community groups. The rural water supply system is divided into Collective Water Supply Solutions (SAC) and Individual Alternative Water Supply Solutions (SAI). SAC serves more than one family, while SAI refers to any form of individual or single-family supply. In the Collective Alternative Solution, there are 42 underground wells and 4 surface water intakes serving 5,450 inhabitants, with nine SACs providing water treatment through chlorination. In the Individual Alternative Solution, 55 households use surface water sources, and 46 households use underground sources, supplying 329 inhabitants. Currently, the municipality lacks a sewage collection system or a sewage treatment plant, and 80.58% of households use rudimentary septic tanks for sewage treatment.

Crissiumal is served by the electric utility Rio Grande Energia, commonly known as RGE, since 1997. This company serves 264 municipalities in the northern and northeastern regions of Rio Grande do Sul. According to the 2010 IBGE Census, 4,874 permanent private households had electricity from a distribution company, six households had electricity from other sources, and 22 households had no electricity. The collection and treatment of household waste is the municipality's responsibility but is carried out by a contracted company. Most waste is stored in plastic bags and remains in bins until collection, which begins at 5 a.m. The waste is then transported to the headquarters of the Intermunicipal Consortium for Multifunctional Management (CITEGEM) in Bom Progresso, where final disposal occurs. In the rural areas of the municipality, dry waste collection is conducted quarterly.

=== Transportation ===
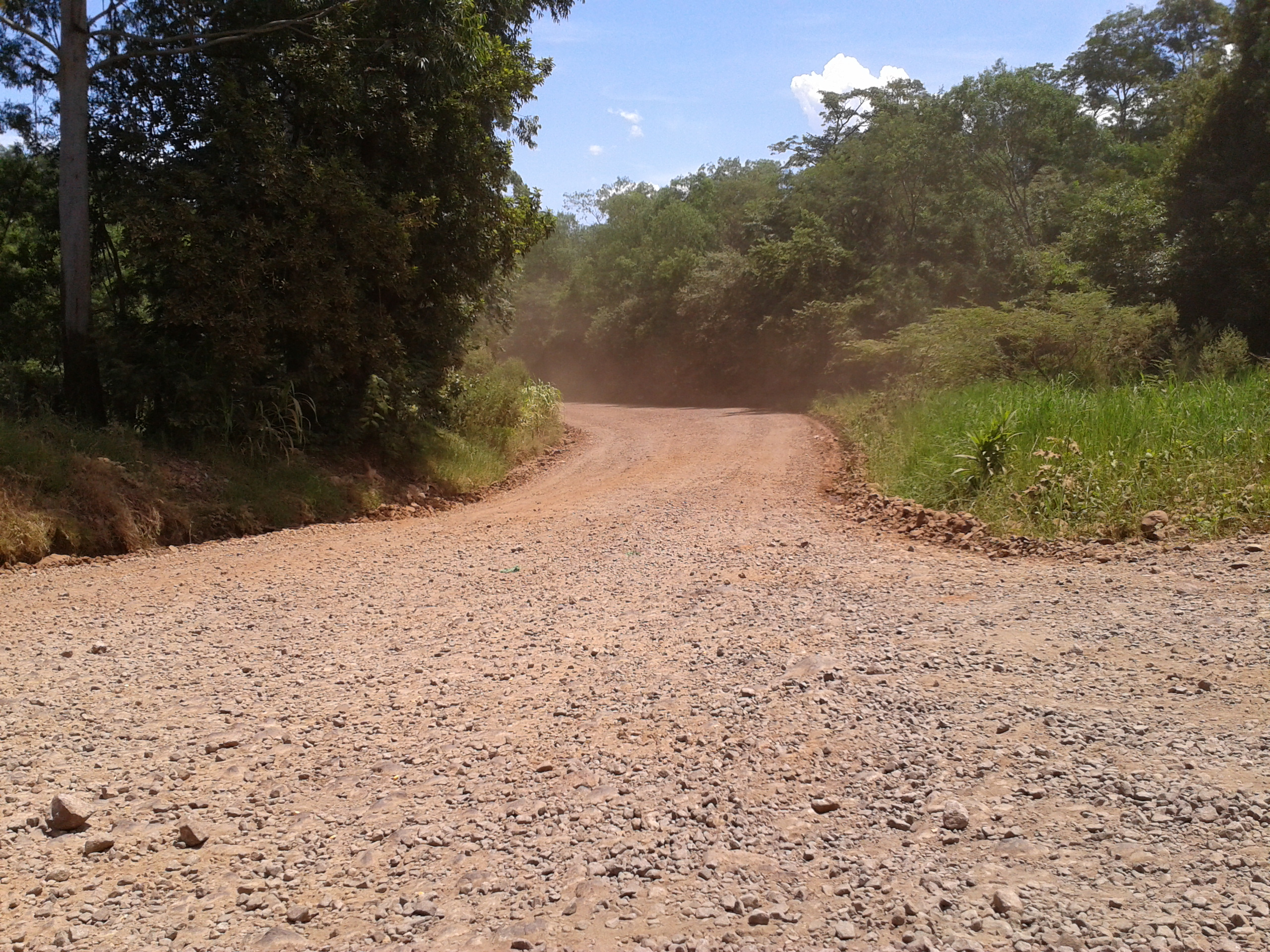
Highway RS-305 connecting Crissiumal to Horizontina.

The main land access routes are RS-207, which is paved and connects Crissiumal to Humaitá and BR-468, and RS-305, which is under paving and links Crissiumal to Horizontina and Três Passos. Part of RS-305, connecting the city to Horizontina and Três Passos, is in poor condition, with potholes, ditches, uneven surfaces, and rocks. Currently, no work is being done on this highway, despite the Autonomous Department of Highways stating that RS-305 is under paving. The movement of goods and passengers occurs solely via highways. The nearest access points to active railways are in Santo Ângelo and Ijuí, and airports with infrastructure for handling passengers and cargo are located in Santa Rosa and Ijuí, in addition to an airfield in Campo Novo, with a 1.02 km paved runway for private aircraft only. Crissiumal is also close to two ferries on the Uruguay River, one connecting Porto Soberbo in Tiradentes do Sul to El Soberbio, Argentina; and another linking Barra do Guarita to Itapiranga, Santa Catarina. The city also has a fourth-class bus station in its downtown area.

The municipal vehicle fleet in 2015 consisted of 9,045 vehicles, including 4,572 cars, 354 trucks, 37 tractor-trucks, 560 pickup trucks, 170 vans, 17 minibuses, 2,875 motorcycles, 232 mopeds, 55 buses, and 139 other types of vehicles. The entity responsible for managing road transportation in the state of Rio Grande do Sul is the Autonomous Department of Highways (DAER), a state agency founded in 1937. Its responsibilities include road planning, issuing road regulations, constructing, operating, and maintaining highways, and policing road traffic.

=== Communications ===
The Brazilian press began in 1808 with the arrival of the Portuguese royal family in Brazil, as all press activities—whether the publication of newspapers or books—were previously prohibited. The Gazeta do Rio de Janeiro, the first newspaper published in national territory, began circulation on September 10, 1808. Radio broadcasting emerged on September 7, 1922, with the first transmission being a speech by then-President Epitácio Pessoa, although radio was officially established on April 20, 1923, with the creation of the "Rádio Sociedade do Rio de Janeiro". Television in Brazil officially began on September 18, 1950, introduced by Assis Chateaubriand, who founded the first television channel in the country, TV Tupi. Crissiumal has two printed newspapers in circulation, the Jornal Colonial de Crissiumal and A Notícia, a monthly free newsletter called Revista D'Olho, and two online newspapers, Guia Crissiumal and TopSul Notícias. There are also several radio stations, including Metrópole 1070 AM, Alto Uruguai Ltda. 92.5 FM, and Comunitária de Crissiumal 104.9 FM.

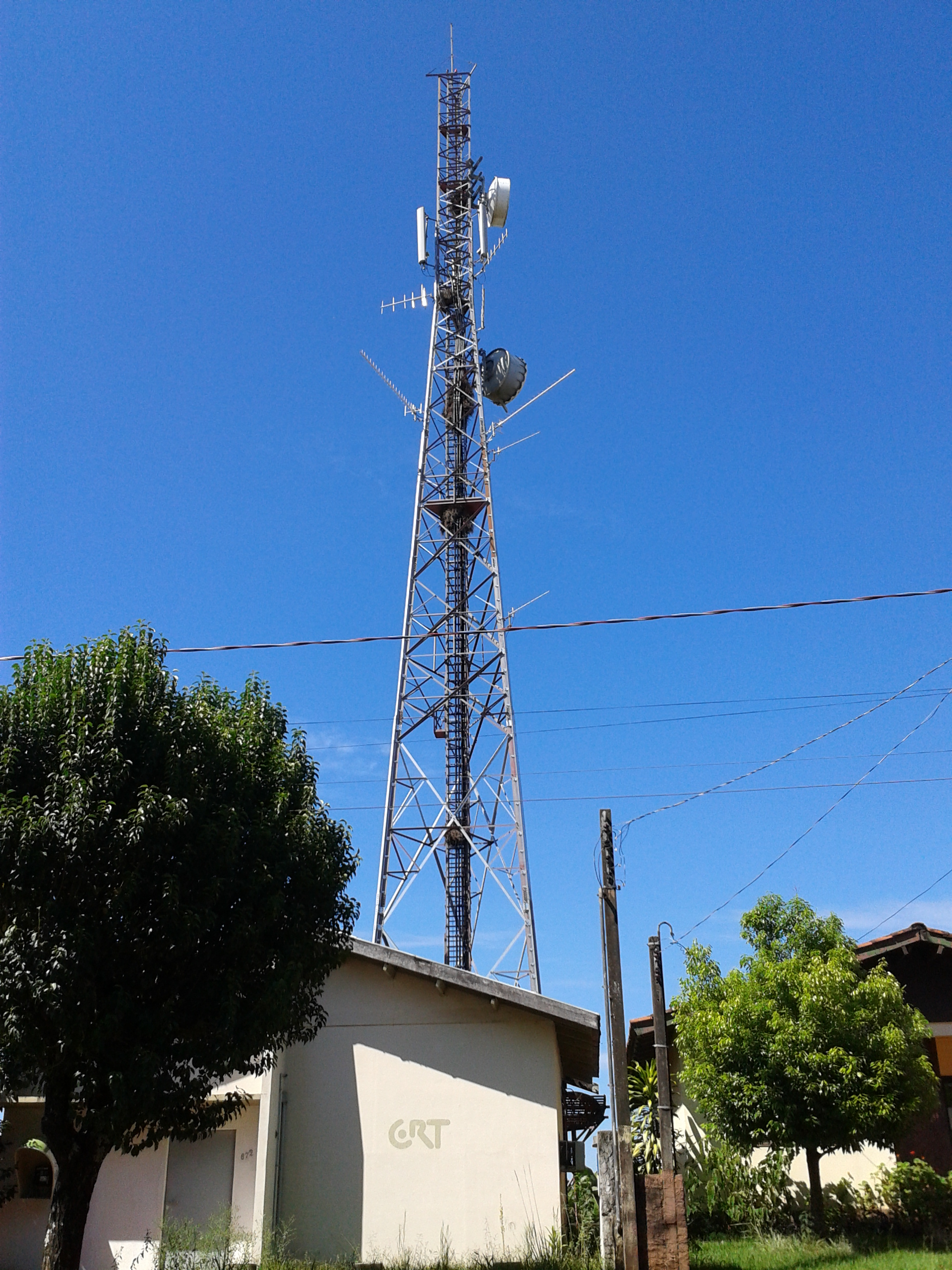
Telephone tower.

The municipality offers dial-up and broadband (ADSL) Internet services provided by several Internet service providers. Mobile telephone services are offered by various operators. The municipality has access to 2G services provided by the operators Claro, Oi Móvel, Vivo, and TIM Celular; 3G services by Claro, Vivo, and TIM Celular, and 4G by Vivo. The area code (DDD) for Crissiumal is 055, and the postal code (CEP) for the city is 98640-000. The Correios operates one agency in the city center and four Community Post Offices in Esquina Gaúcha, Vila Bender, Vila Planalto, and Vista Nova. On January 8, 2009, the municipality began to benefit from number portability, along with 160 municipalities in the state of Rio Grande do Sul that use the same DDD as Crissiumal and 157 municipalities with DDD 51. Number portability allows users to switch operators without changing their phone numbers.

In 2015, the municipality had 57 public telephones, 742 private fixed-line telephones, 129 pay-TV subscriptions, and 121 fixed Internet connections. The regulatory body for telecommunications is the National Telecommunications Agency, established in 1997, which, in addition to regulating, grants licenses, supervises, and takes measures to serve the interests of citizens.

== Culture ==
The culture of the city is heavily influenced by Germanic culture, brought and nurtured by German immigrants who settled the region. The Hunsrik dialect, a variety of the German language, is still spoken today by a significant number of people, particularly among the older residents. The city is home to the Municipal Public Library, established in 1955 and named Carlos Laert Public Library in honor of the teacher, poet, and journalist Carlos Laert. Additionally, the Municipal Museum, founded in 1983, houses objects that narrate the history of the municipality and its population. Crissiumal also features a Gaucho Traditions Center, known as CTG Estância da Saudade, founded in 1966, with the purpose of preserving Gaucho traditions, history, culture, and customs, including language, clothing, cuisine, and popular arts. Notable events in the municipality include the Day of Our Lady of Navigators, celebrated on February 2 along the banks of the Uruguay River at Barra do Lajeado Grande, June festivals in June, and celebrations of Brazil's Independence Day and the Farroupilha Revolution in September, featuring parades through the city streets. Another significant event is Expocris, which first took place in 1994 and occurs biennially.

=== Arts ===
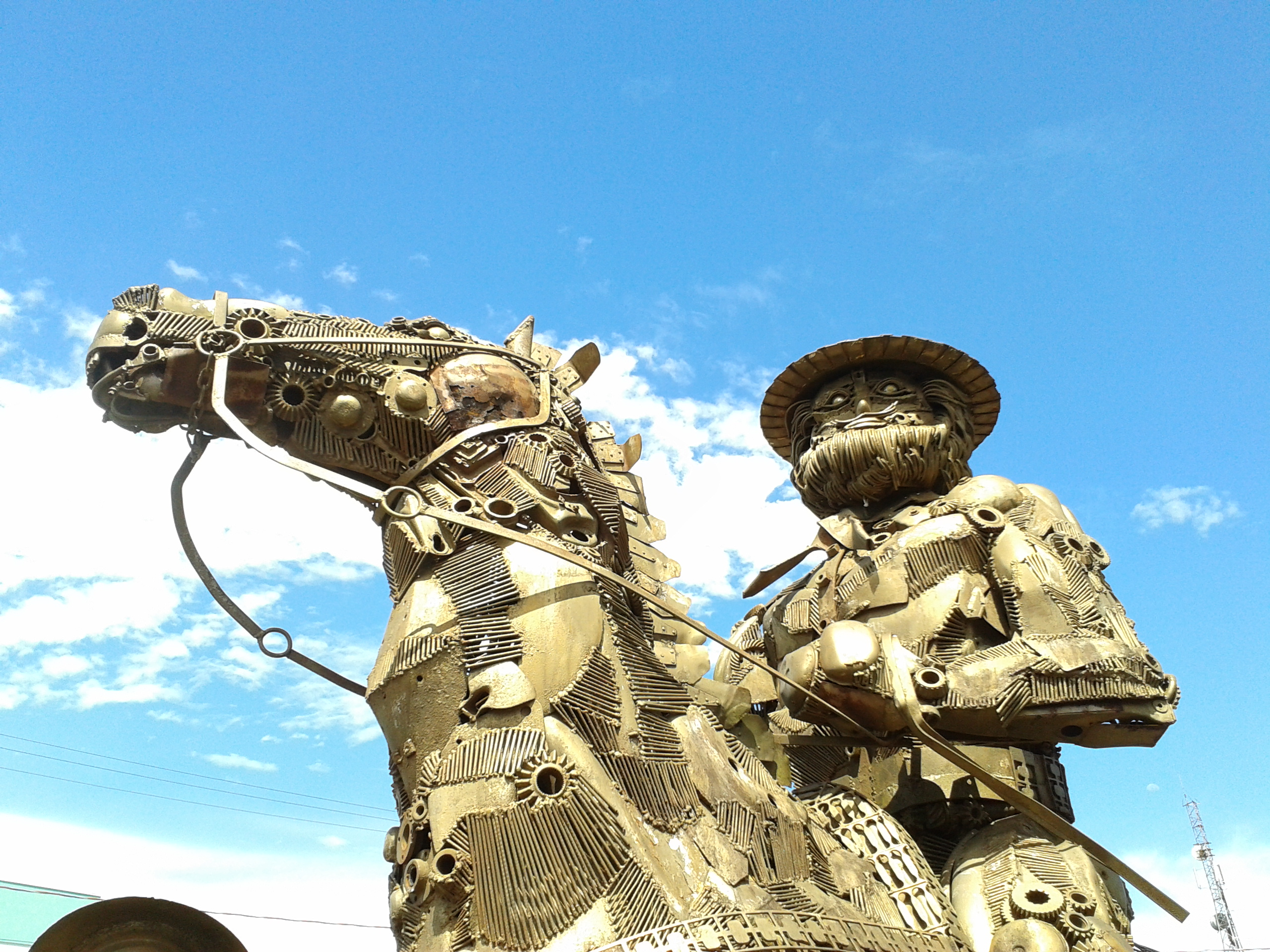
Detail of the Pioneer Monument, a sculpture made from scrap metal by the artist Paulo Siqueira.

Music has been a part of Crissiumal since its colonization. The first musical group was the band Vida Azul, followed later by jazz ensembles such as Jazz Brasil, Jazz Amor da Serra from Linha Principal, Jazz Az de Ouro, and Jazz Flor de Maio. Additionally, Crissiumal's first rock band, Os Podres, emerged in 1989 and disbanded in 2002. Current bands in the municipality include Danúbio Azul, Musical Som Sete, Musical Calmon, Banda Os Bade, and the Crissiumal Municipal Band. The city is also home to troubadours such as Jairo Coelho, who is also a composer, and Ornélio de Souza, known by the nickname Teixeirinha. Furthermore, the Santa Cecília Choir, established in the 1950s, performs sacred and popular music.

In literature, notable writers include José Raymundo Pletsch, a professor and lawyer who authored the books História de Criciumal and Apontamentos Sobre o Passado de Crissiumal; Jenair Vicentini, a stenographer and teacher who wrote Crissiumal: Documentário: Essência da Nossa História; and Teresinha Schwanke and Vera Pohl, both teachers and co-authors of the book Da Criciúma a Crissiumal.

In dance, the city is home to the Madre Paulina Ethnic Group - GEMP Escola & Cia. de Dança, founded in 1995. The company has won awards in every competition it has entered, including nine awards for eight choreographies presented at an international competition in 2004. In 2013, GEMP received the Vitor Matheus Teixeira Award from the Legislative Assembly of Rio Grande do Sul in recognition of its efforts to promote Rio Grande do Sul's culture. In addition to this company, there is also the Madre Paulina Skating Company and the Dance Group of the CTG Estância da Saudade.

=== Language ===
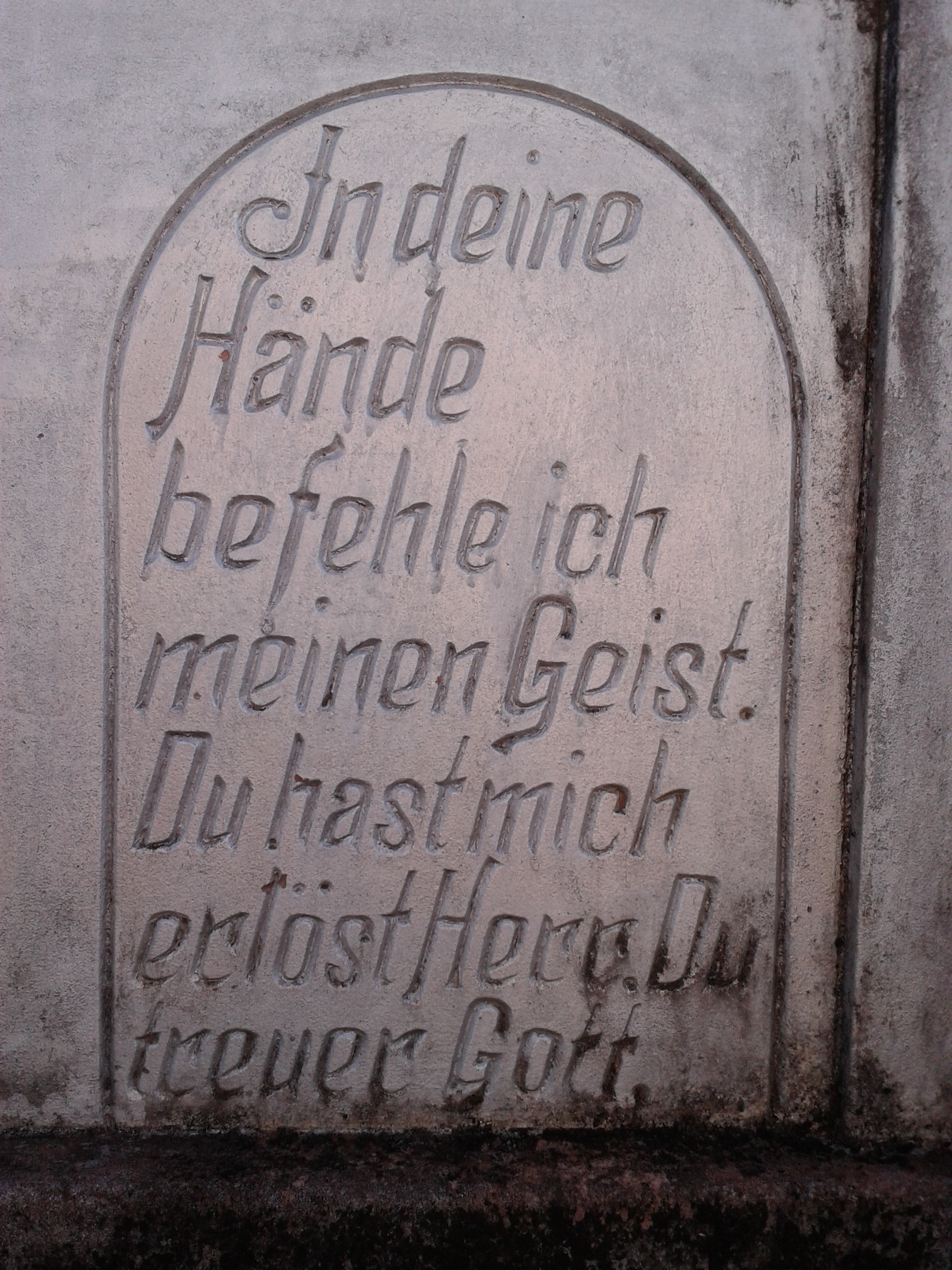
Tombstone in Crissiumal's Municipal Cemetery with an epitaph in German, which, loosely translated, reads: "Into your hands I commend my spirit. You have redeemed me, Lord. You, faithful God."

Portuguese is the official language of Crissiumal, spoken by nearly the entire population and virtually the only language used in media, business, and administrative purposes. Brazilian Portuguese has developed uniquely, influenced by Amerindian, African, and other European languages. In Rio Grande do Sul, there is a variant of Brazilian Portuguese with distinct lexical characteristics and influences from Italian, Spanish, and German, featuring words such as cacetinho (French bread), faixa (road, asphalt), cusco (dog), sinaleira (traffic light), bergamota (tangerine), and expressions like "frio de renguear cusco," meaning intense, unbearable cold.

As in many municipalities in Rio Grande do Sul, the German language, in its Rio Grande variant, is an integral part of Crissiumal's history since its founding. The dialect spoken in the region is Hunsrückisch, a variant prevalent in the Hunsrück region of southwestern Germany. This dialect is also known as Hunsrück, Hunsrick, Hunsbucklisch, Hunsriqueano, Hunsrickisch, Brazilianized Hunsrik, Riograndense Hunsrückisch, and Riograndenser Hunsrückisch. Speakers of this dialect have adopted Portuguese terms, creating words such as fakong (faction), aviong (airplane), kamiong (truck), and milheprot (cornbread). Some rarely spoken variants include Sächsisch, Österreichisch, Hessisch, Alemannisch, and Berlinisch. In 2012, the Legislative Assembly of Rio Grande do Sul unanimously approved the official recognition of the Rio Grande German dialect as an integral part of the state's cultural heritage.

=== Cuisine ===
A typical dish in the local cuisine is feijoada, which can be prepared with black beans, pork fat, sausage, dried meats, fresh and dried seasonings, and may be accompanied by white rice and cassava flour. In addition to typical Rio Grande do Sul dishes such as churrasco, arroz de carreteiro, and chimarrão, Crissiumal's cuisine has been influenced by Italian immigrants with dishes such as galeto, pasta, wine, and polenta, and by German immigrants with sausages, sauerkraut, potato salad, and beer. Barbecue is made with meat seasoned only with salt, grilled over coals or an open fire, and can be served with cassava flour, mayonnaise salad, and leafy salads with vinaigrette. Arroz de carreteiro is a mixture of rice with dried beef or leftover barbecue meat. Chimarrão, a legacy of the Guarani indigenous people, is an infusion of yerba mate served in a gourd. Polenta is a cornmeal paste cooked in a heated pot and can be served soft, firm, grilled, or fried. Sauerkraut is prepared with shredded cabbage and salt, left to ferment in a container for some time.

=== Sports ===
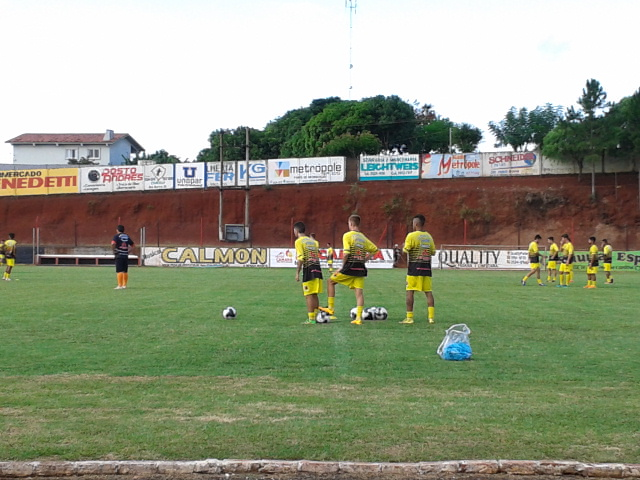
Training session of the Tupi football team at the Rubro-negro Municipal Stadium.

A popular sport in Crissiumal is football. Decades ago, rural communities in the municipality had football teams composed of local residents. There were so many willing players that the most skilled were selected to form the teams. Today, due to rural exodus, fewer young people remain in rural areas, making it difficult for communities to form football teams. Annually, the Municipal Sports Council - CMD organizes an amateur football championship with teams composed of athletes from the municipality and neighboring municipalities. The championship finals take place at the Rubro-Negro Municipal Stadium. The CMD and the Municipal Public Employees Association (AFPM) also organize the municipal futsal championship. There are categories for the following groups: under-15 boys, men, women, and seniors. Since 1987, the Municipal Education Department has held the Inter-school Games at the Municipal Sports Gymnasium in partnership with a local school. The games feature male and female futsal and volleyball in the U-12, junior, and children's categories. Other sports practiced in the municipality include canasta, bocce, bocha 48, tabletop bowling, and motocross.

In Crissiumal, there is a football club founded on May 1, 1949, named Tupi Futebol Clube. This team faced Internacional in 1970, America in 1974, and Grêmio in 1978. Notable athletes from Crissiumal include Cláudio André Mergen Taffarel, born in Santa Rosa, who played for Tupi, Sport Club Internacional, Parma, Reggiana, and the Brazilian national football team, and Danrlei de Deus Hinterholz, born in Crissiumal, who played for Grêmio for ten years, Atlético Mineiro, the Brazilian national team, and was elected a federal congressman in 2010 and re-elected in 2014. Additionally, Roberto Gilmar Hinterholz, who played for Tupi and became a world club champion is also notable.

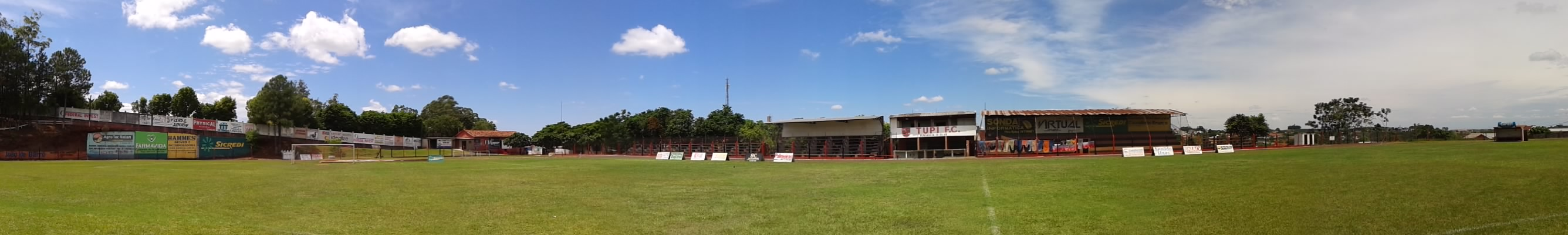
Panorama of the Rubro-negro Municipal Stadium in Crissiumal.

=== Holidays ===
In addition to the national holidays of January 1 (Universal Fraternity), April 21 (Tiradentes), May 1 (International Workers' Day), September 7 (Independence Day), October 12 (Our Lady of Aparecida), November 2 (All Souls' Day), November 15 (Proclamation of the Republic), and December 25 (Christmas) and the state holiday of September 20 (Farroupilha Revolution), Crissiumal celebrates municipal holidays on February 28 (municipal emancipation), June 15 (Corpus Christi), and October 31 (Reformation Day).

== See also ==
- List of municipalities in Rio Grande do Sul

== Bibliography ==
- Heinsch, Egon Theophilo (2005). Crissiumal: um pouco de história: o Tupy F. C. e sua luta [Crissiumal: A Bit of History: Tupy F.C. and Its Struggle]. Porto Alegre: EST Edições.
- Pletsch, José Raymundo, ed. (1995). Apontamentos Sobre o Passado de Crissiumal: 1933 - 1993 [Notes on the Past of Crissiumal: 1933 - 1993]. Ijuí: Sedigraf.
- Pletsch, José Raymundo (1978). História de Crissiumal [History of Crissiumal]. Santa Rosa: Colégio Salesiano Dom Bosco.
- Schwanke, Teresinha Maria; Pohl, Vera Lúcia Bagetti (2007). Da Criciúma a Crissiumal: Estudos Sociais [From Criciúma to Crissiumal: Social Studies]. Três de Maio: SETREM.
- Vicentini, Jenair; Klinger, Aline Patricia (2011). Crissiumal: Documentário: Essência da nossa história - 78 anos de história 57 anos de autonomia político administrativa [Crissiumal: Documentary: Essence of Our History - 78 Years of History, 57 Years of Political-Administrative Autonomy]. Horizontina: SR.
