= List of mesoregions and microregions of Rio Grande do Sul =

Map of Rio Grande do Sul showing its municipalities grouped into microregions, which in turn are grouped into mesoregions

This is the list of mesoregions and microregions of Rio Grande do Sul, a Brazilian state in the Southern Region of the country. The state of Rio Grande do Sul was geographically divided by the Brazilian Institute of Geography and Statistics (IBGE) into seven mesoregions, which, in turn, encompassed 35 microregions, according to the framework in place between 1989 and 2017.

In 2017, IBGE abolished the mesoregions and microregions, creating a new Brazilian regional framework with new geographical divisions known as intermediate and immediate geographical regions.

Despite the abolition, IBGE used the mesoregions and microregions for the dissemination of data from the 2017 agricultural census in 2020.

== Mesoregions of Rio Grande do Sul ==
Mesoregion	Code	Number of municipalities	Location	Microregions	Code
Northwest Rio-Grandense	01	216		Santa Rosa	001
Northwest Rio-Grandense	01	216		Três Passos	002
Northwest Rio-Grandense	01	216		Frederico Westphalen	003
Northwest Rio-Grandense	01	216		Erechim	004
Northwest Rio-Grandense	01	216		Sananduva	005
Northwest Rio-Grandense	01	216		Cerro Largo	006
Northwest Rio-Grandense	01	216		Santo Angelo	007
Northwest Rio-Grandense	01	216		Ijuí	008
Northwest Rio-Grandense	01	216		Carazinho	009
Northwest Rio-Grandense	01	216		Passo Fundo	010
Northwest Rio-Grandense	01	216		Cruz Alta	011
Northwest Rio-Grandense	01	216		Nao-Me-Toque	012
Northwest Rio-Grandense	01	216		Soledade	013
Northeast Rio-Grandense	02	54		Guaporé	014
Northeast Rio-Grandense	02	54		Vacaria	015
Northeast Rio-Grandense	02	54		Caxias do Sul	016
Centro Occidental Rio-Grandense	03	31		Santiago	017
Centro Occidental Rio-Grandense	03	31		Santa Maria	018
Centro Occidental Rio-Grandense	03	31		Restinga Seca	019
Centro Oriental Rio-Grandense	04	54		Santa Cruz do Sul	020
Centro Oriental Rio-Grandense	04	54		Lajeado-Estrela	021
Centro Oriental Rio-Grandense	04	54		Cachoeira do Sul	022
Metropolitan of Porto Alegre	05	98		Montenegro	023
Metropolitan of Porto Alegre	05	98		Gramado-Canela	024
Metropolitan of Porto Alegre	05	98		São Jerônimo	025
Metropolitan of Porto Alegre	05	98		Porto Alegre	026
Metropolitan of Porto Alegre	05	98		Osorio	027
Metropolitan of Porto Alegre	05	98		Camaquã	028
Southwest Rio-Grandense	06	19		Campanha Ocidental	029
Southwest Rio-Grandense	06	19		Campanha Central	030
Southwest Rio-Grandense	06	19		Campanha Meridional	031
Southeast Rio-Grandense	07	25		Serras de Sudeste	032
Southeast Rio-Grandense	07	25		Pelotas	033
Southeast Rio-Grandense	07	25		Jaguarão	034
Southeast Rio-Grandense	07	25		Litoral Lagunar	035

== Microregions of Rio Grande do Sul divided by mesoregions ==
=== Northwestern Rio-Grandense Mesoregion ===
Microregion	Code	Location	Counties
Santa Rosa	001		Alecrim
Santa Rosa	001		Cândido Godói
Santa Rosa	001		Independência
Santa Rosa	001		Novo Machado
Santa Rosa	001		Porto Lucena
Santa Rosa	001		Porto Mauá
Santa Rosa	001		Porto Vera Cruz
Santa Rosa	001		Santa Rosa
Santa Rosa	001		Santo Cristo
Santa Rosa	001		São José do Inhacorá
Santa Rosa	001		Três de Maio
Santa Rosa	001		Tucunduva
Santa Rosa	001		Tuparendi
Três Passos	002		Barra do Guarita
Três Passos	002		Boa Vista do Buricá
Três Passos	002		Bom Progresso
Três Passos	002		Braga
Três Passos	002		Campo Novo
Três Passos	002		Crissiumal
Três Passos	002		Derrubadas
Três Passos	002		Doutor Maurício Cardoso
Três Passos	002		Esperança do Sul
Três Passos	002		Horizontina
Três Passos	002		Humaitá
Três Passos	002		Miraguaí
Três Passos	002		Nova Candelária
Três Passos	002		Redentora
Três Passos	002		São Martinho
Três Passos	002		Sede Nova
Três Passos	002		Tenente Portela
Três Passos	002		Tiradentes do Sul
Três Passos	002		Três Passos
Três Passos	002		Vista Gaúcha
Frederico Westphalen	003		Alpestre
Frederico Westphalen	003		Ametista do Sul
Frederico Westphalen	003		Caiçara
Frederico Westphalen	003		Constantina
Frederico Westphalen	003		Cristal do Sul
Frederico Westphalen	003		Dois Irmãos das Missões
Frederico Westphalen	003		Engenho Velho
Frederico Westphalen	003		Erval Seco
Frederico Westphalen	003		Frederico Westphalen
Frederico Westphalen	003		Gramado dos Loureiros
Frederico Westphalen	003		Iraí
Frederico Westphalen	003		Liberato Salzano
Frederico Westphalen	003		Nonoai
Frederico Westphalen	003		Novo Tiradentes
Frederico Westphalen	003		Novo Xingu
Frederico Westphalen	003		Palmitinho
Frederico Westphalen	003		Pinheirinho do Vale
Frederico Westphalen	003		Planalto
Frederico Westphalen	003		Rio dos Índios
Frederico Westphalen	003		Rodeio Bonito
Frederico Westphalen	003		Rondinha
Frederico Westphalen	003		Seberi
Frederico Westphalen	003		Taquaruçu do Sul
Frederico Westphalen	003		Três Palmeiras
Frederico Westphalen	003		Trindade do Sul
Frederico Westphalen	003		Vicente Dutra
Frederico Westphalen	003		Vista Alegre
Erechim	004		Aratiba
Erechim	004		Áurea
Erechim	004		Barão de Cotegipe
Erechim	004		Barra do Rio Azul
Erechim	004		Benjamin Constant do Sul
Erechim	004		Campinas do Sul
Erechim	004		Carlos Gomes
Erechim	004		Centenário
Erechim	004		Cruzaltense
Erechim	004		Entre Rios do Sul
Erechim	004		Erebango
Erechim	004		Erechim
Erechim	004		Erval Grande
Erechim	004		Estação
Erechim	004		Faxinalzinho
Erechim	004		Floriano Peixoto
Erechim	004		Gaurama
Erechim	004		Getúlio Vargas
Erechim	004		Ipiranga do Sul
Erechim	004		Itatiba do Sul
Erechim	004		Jacutinga
Erechim	004		Marcelino Ramos
Erechim	004		Mariano Moro
Erechim	004		Paulo Bento
Erechim	004		Ponte Preta
Erechim	004		Quatro Irmãos
Erechim	004		São Valentim
Erechim	004		Severiano de Almeida
Erechim	004		Três Arroios
Erechim	004		Viadutos
Sananduva	005		Barracão
Sananduva	005		Cacique Doble
Sananduva	005		Ibiaçá
Sananduva	005		Machadinho
Sananduva	005		Maximiliano de Almeida
Sananduva	005		Paim Filho
Sananduva	005		Sananduva
Sananduva	005		Santo Expedito do Sul
Sananduva	005		São João da Urtiga
Sananduva	005		São José do Ouro
Sananduva	005		Tupanci do Sul
Cerro Largo	006		Caibaté
Cerro Largo	006		Campina das Missões
Cerro Largo	006		Cerro Largo
Cerro Largo	006		Guarani das Missões
Cerro Largo	006		Mato Queimado
Cerro Largo	006		Porto Xavier
Cerro Largo	006		Roque Gonzales
Cerro Largo	006		Salvador das Missões
Cerro Largo	006		São Paulo das Missões
Cerro Largo	006		São Pedro do Butiá
Cerro Largo	006		Sete de Setembro
Santo Ângelo	007		Bossoroca
Santo Ângelo	007		Catuípe
Santo Ângelo	007		Dezesseis de Novembro
Santo Ângelo	007		Entre-Ijuís
Santo Ângelo	007		Eugênio de Castro
Santo Ângelo	007		Giruá
Santo Ângelo	007		Pirapó
Santo Ângelo	007		Rolador
Santo Ângelo	007		Santo Ângelo
Santo Ângelo	007		Santo Antônio das Missões
Santo Ângelo	007		São Luiz Gonzaga
Santo Ângelo	007		São Miguel das Missões
Santo Ângelo	007		São Nicolau
Santo Ângelo	007		Senador Salgado Filho
Santo Ângelo	007		Ubiretama
Santo Ângelo	007		Vitória das Missões
Ijuí	008		Ajuricaba
Ijuí	008		Alegria
Ijuí	008		Augusto Pestana
Ijuí	008		Bozano
Ijuí	008		Chiapetta
Ijuí	008		Condor
Ijuí	008		Coronel Barros
Ijuí	008		Coronel Bicaco
Ijuí	008		Ijuí
Ijuí	008		Inhacorá
Ijuí	008		Nova Ramada
Ijuí	008		Panambi
Ijuí	008		Pejuçara
Ijuí	008		Santo Augusto
Ijuí	008		São Valério do Sul
Carazinho	009		Almirante Tamandaré do Sul
Carazinho	009		Barra Funda
Carazinho	009		Boa Vista das Missões
Carazinho	009		Carazinho
Carazinho	009		Cerro Grande
Carazinho	009		Chapada
Carazinho	009		Coqueiros do Sul
Carazinho	009		Jaboticaba
Carazinho	009		Lajeado do Bugre
Carazinho	009		Nova Boa Vista
Carazinho	009		Novo Barreiro
Carazinho	009		Palmeira das Missões
Carazinho	009		Pinhal
Carazinho	009		Sagrada Família
Carazinho	009		Santo Antônio do Planalto
Carazinho	009		São José das Missões
Carazinho	009		São Pedro das Missões
Carazinho	009		Sarandi
Passo Fundo	010		Água Santa
Passo Fundo	010		Camargo
Passo Fundo	010		Casca
Passo Fundo	010		Caseiros
Passo Fundo	010		Charrua
Passo Fundo	010		Ciríaco
Passo Fundo	010		Coxilha
Passo Fundo	010		David Canabarro
Passo Fundo	010		Ernestina
Passo Fundo	010		Gentil
Passo Fundo	010		Ibiraiaras
Passo Fundo	010		Marau
Passo Fundo	010		Mato Castelhano
Passo Fundo	010		Muliterno
Passo Fundo	010		Nicolau Vergueiro
Passo Fundo	010		Passo Fundo
Passo Fundo	010		Pontão
Passo Fundo	010		Ronda Alta
Passo Fundo	010		Santa Cecília do Sul
Passo Fundo	010		Santo Antônio do Palma
Passo Fundo	010		São Domingos do Sul
Passo Fundo	010		Sertão
Passo Fundo	010		Tapejara
Passo Fundo	010		Vanini
Passo Fundo	010		Vila Lângaro
Passo Fundo	010		Vila Maria
Cruz Alta	011		Alto Alegre
Cruz Alta	011		Boa Vista do Cadeado
Cruz Alta	011		Boa Vista do Incra
Cruz Alta	011		Campos Borges
Cruz Alta	011		Cruz Alta
Cruz Alta	011		Espumoso
Cruz Alta	011		Fortaleza dos Valos
Cruz Alta	011		Ibirubá
Cruz Alta	011		Jacuizinho
Cruz Alta	011		Jóia
Cruz Alta	011		Quinze de Novembro
Cruz Alta	011		Saldanha Marinho
Cruz Alta	011		Salto do Jacuí
Cruz Alta	011		Santa Bárbara do Sul
Não-Me-Toque	012		Colorado
Não-Me-Toque	012		Lagoa dos Três Cantos
Não-Me-Toque	012		Não-Me-Toque
Não-Me-Toque	012		Selbach
Não-Me-Toque	012		Tapera
Não-Me-Toque	012		Tio Hugo
Não-Me-Toque	012		Victor Graeff
Soledade	013		Barros Cassal
Soledade	013		Fontoura Xavier
Soledade	013		Ibirapuitã
Soledade	013		Lagoão
Soledade	013		Mormaço
Soledade	013		São José do Herval
Soledade	013		Soledade
Soledade	013		Tunas

=== Northeast Rio-Grandense Mesoregion ===
Microregion	Code	Location	Counties
Guaporé	014		André da Rocha
Guaporé	014		Anta Gorda
Guaporé	014		Arvorezinha
Guaporé	014		Dois Lajeados
Guaporé	014		Guabiju
Guaporé	014		Guaporé
Guaporé	014		Ilópolis
Guaporé	014		Itapuca
Guaporé	014		Montauri
Guaporé	014		Nova Alvorada
Guaporé	014		Nova Araçá
Guaporé	014		Nova Bassano
Guaporé	014		Nova Prata
Guaporé	014		Paraí
Guaporé	014		Protásio Alves
Guaporé	014		Putinga
Guaporé	014		São Jorge
Guaporé	014		São Valentim do Sul
Guaporé	014		Serafina Corrêa
Guaporé	014		União da Serra
Guaporé	014		Vista Alegre do Prata
Vacaria	015		Bom Jesus
Vacaria	015		Cambará do Sul
Vacaria	015		Campestre da Serra
Vacaria	015		Capão Bonito do Sul
Vacaria	015		Emeralda
Vacaria	015		Ipê
Vacaria	015		Jaquirana
Vacaria	015		Lagoa Vermelha
Vacaria	015		Monte Alegre dos Campos
Vacaria	015		Muitos Capões
Vacaria	015		Pinhal da Serra
Vacaria	015		São Francisco de Paula
Vacaria	015		São José dos Ausentes
Vacaria	015		Vacaria
Caxias do Sul	016		Antônio Prado
Caxias do Sul	016		Bento Gonçalves
Caxias do Sul	016		Boa Vista do Sul
Caxias do Sul	016		Carlos Barbosa
Caxias do Sul	016		Caxias do Sul
Caxias do Sul	016		Coronel Pilar
Caxias do Sul	016		Cotiporã
Caxias do Sul	016		Fagundes Varela
Caxias do Sul	016		Farroupilha
Caxias do Sul	016		Flores da Cunha
Caxias do Sul	016		Garibaldi
Caxias do Sul	016		Monte Belo do Sul
Caxias do Sul	016		Nova Pádua
Caxias do Sul	016		Nova Roma do Sul
Caxias do Sul	016		Pinto Bandeira
Caxias do Sul	016		Santa Tereza
Caxias do Sul	016		São Marcos
Caxias do Sul	016		Veranópolis
Caxias do Sul	016		Vila Flores

=== Mesoregion of the Central Western Rio-Grandense ===
Microregion	Code	Location	Counties
Santiago	017		Capão do Cipó
Santiago	017		Itacurubi
Santiago	017		Jari
Santiago	017		Júlio de Castilhos
Santiago	017		Pinhal Grande
Santiago	017		Quevedos
Santiago	017		Santiago
Santiago	017		Tupanciretã
Santiago	017		Unistalda
Santa Maria	018		Cacequi
Santa Maria	018		Dilermando de Aguiar
Santa Maria	018		Itaara
Santa Maria	018		Jaguari
Santa Maria	018		Mata
Santa Maria	018		Nova Esperança do Sul
Santa Maria	018		Santa Maria
Santa Maria	018		São Martinho da Serra
Santa Maria	018		São Pedro do Sul
Santa Maria	018		São Sepé
Santa Maria	018		São Vicente do Sul
Santa Maria	018		Toropi
Santa Maria	018		Vila Nova do Sul
Restinga Seca	019		Agudo
Restinga Seca	019		Dona Francisca
Restinga Seca	019		Faxinal do Soturno
Restinga Seca	019		Formigueiro
Restinga Seca	019		Ivorá
Restinga Seca	019		Nova Palma
Restinga Seca	019		Restinga Seca
Restinga Seca	019		São João do Polêsine
Restinga Seca	019		Silveira Martins

=== Mesorregião do Centro Oriental Rio-Grandense ===
Microrregião	Código	Localização	Municípios
Santa Cruz do Sul	020		Arroio do Tigre
Santa Cruz do Sul	020		Candelária
Santa Cruz do Sul	020		Estrela Velha
Santa Cruz do Sul	020		Gramado Xavier
Santa Cruz do Sul	020		Herveiras
Santa Cruz do Sul	020		Ibarama
Santa Cruz do Sul	020		Lagoa Bonita do Sul
Santa Cruz do Sul	020		Mato Leitão
Santa Cruz do Sul	020		Passa-Sete
Santa Cruz do Sul	020		Santa Cruz do Sul
Santa Cruz do Sul	020		Segredo
Santa Cruz do Sul	020		Sinimbu
Santa Cruz do Sul	020		Sobradinho
Santa Cruz do Sul	020		Vale do Sol
Santa Cruz do Sul	020		Venâncio Aires
Santa Cruz do Sul	020		Vera Cruz
Lajeado-Estrela	021		Arroio do Meio
Lajeado-Estrela	021		Bom Retiro do Sul
Lajeado-Estrela	021		Boqueirão do Leão
Lajeado-Estrela	021		Canudos do Vale
Lajeado-Estrela	021		Capitão
Lajeado-Estrela	021		Colinas
Lajeado-Estrela	021		Coqueiro Baixo
Lajeado-Estrela	021		Cruzeiro do Sul
Lajeado-Estrela	021		Doutor Ricardo
Lajeado-Estrela	021		Encantado
Lajeado-Estrela	021		Estrela
Lajeado-Estrela	021		Fazenda Vilanova
Lajeado-Estrela	021		Forquetinha
Lajeado-Estrela	021		Imigrante
Lajeado-Estrela	021		Lajeado
Lajeado-Estrela	021		Marques de Souza
Lajeado-Estrela	021		Muçum
Lajeado-Estrela	021		Nova Bréscia
Lajeado-Estrela	021		Paverama
Lajeado-Estrela	021		Pouso Novo
Lajeado-Estrela	021		Progresso
Lajeado-Estrela	021		Relvado
Lajeado-Estrela	021		Roca Sales
Lajeado-Estrela	021		Santa Clara do Sul
Lajeado-Estrela	021		Sério
Lajeado-Estrela	021		Tabaí
Lajeado-Estrela	021		Taquari
Lajeado-Estrela	021		Teutônia
Lajeado-Estrela	021		Travesseiro
Lajeado-Estrela	021		Vespasiano Corrêa
Lajeado-Estrela	021		Westfália
Cachoeira do Sul	022		Cachoeira do Sul
Cachoeira do Sul	022		Cerro Branco
Cachoeira do Sul	022		Novo Cabrais
Cachoeira do Sul	022		Pantano Grande
Cachoeira do Sul	022		Paraíso do Sul
Cachoeira do Sul	022		Passo do Sobrado
Cachoeira do Sul	022		Rio Pardo

=== Porto Alegre Metropolitan Mesoregion ===
Microregion	Code	Location	Counties
Montenegro	023		Alto Alegre
Montenegro	023		Barão
Montenegro	023		Bom Princípio
Montenegro	023		Brochier
Montenegro	023		Capela de Santana
Montenegro	023		Feliz
Montenegro	023		Harmonia
Montenegro	023		Linha Nova
Montenegro	023		Maratá
Montenegro	023		Montenegro
Montenegro	023		Pareci Novo
Montenegro	023		Poço das Antas
Montenegro	023		Portão
Montenegro	023		Salvador do Sul
Montenegro	023		São José do Hortêncio
Montenegro	023		São José do Sul
Montenegro	023		São Pedro da Serra
Montenegro	023		São Sebastião do Caí
Montenegro	023		São Vendelino
Montenegro	023		Tupandi
Montenegro	023		Vale Real
Gramado-Canela	024		Canela
Gramado-Canela	024		Dois Irmãos
Gramado-Canela	024		Gramado
Gramado-Canela	024		Igrejinha
Gramado-Canela	024		Ivoti
Gramado-Canela	024		Lindolfo Collor
Gramado-Canela	024		Morro Reuter
Gramado-Canela	024		Nova Petrópolis
Gramado-Canela	024		Picada Café
Gramado-Canela	024		Presidente Lucena
Gramado-Canela	024		Riozinho
Gramado-Canela	024		Rolante
Gramado-Canela	024		Santa Maria do Herval
Gramado-Canela	024		Taquara
Gramado-Canela	024		Três Coroas
São Jerônimo	025		Arroio dos Ratos
São Jerônimo	025		Barão do Triunfo
São Jerônimo	025		Butiá
São Jerônimo	025		Charqueadas
São Jerônimo	025		General Câmara
São Jerônimo	025		Minas do Leão
São Jerônimo	025		São Jerônimo
São Jerônimo	025		Triunfo
São Jerônimo	025		Vale Verde
Porto Alegre	026		Alvorada
Porto Alegre	026		Araricá
Porto Alegre	026		Cachoeirinha
Porto Alegre	026		Campo Bom
Porto Alegre	026		Canoas
Porto Alegre	026		Eldorado do Sul
Porto Alegre	026		Estância Velha
Porto Alegre	026		Esteio
Porto Alegre	026		Glorinha
Porto Alegre	026		Gravataí
Porto Alegre	026		Guaíba
Porto Alegre	026		Mariana Pimentel
Porto Alegre	026		Nova Hartz
Porto Alegre	026		Nova Santa Rita
Porto Alegre	026		Novo Hamburgo
Porto Alegre	026		Parobé
Porto Alegre	026		Porto Alegre
Porto Alegre	026		São Leopoldo
Porto Alegre	026		Sapiranga
Porto Alegre	026		Sapucaia do Sul
Porto Alegre	026		Sertão Santana
Porto Alegre	026		Viamão
Osório	027		Arroio do Sal
Osório	027		Balneário Pinhal
Osório	027		Capão da Canoa
Osório	027		Capivari do Sul
Osório	027		Caraá
Osório	027		Cidreira
Osório	027		Dom Pedro de Alcântara
Osório	027		Imbé
Osório	027		Itati
Osório	027		Mampituba
Osório	027		Maquiné
Osório	027		Morrinhos do Sul
Osório	027		Mostardas
Osório	027		Osório
Osório	027		Palmares do Sul
Osório	027		Santo Antônio da Patrulha
Osório	027		Tavares
Osório	027		Terra de Areia
Osório	027		Torres
Osório	027		Tramandaí
Osório	027		Três Cachoeiras
Osório	027		Três Forquilhas
Osório	027		Xangri-lá
Camaquã	028		Arambaré
Camaquã	028		Barra do Ribeiro
Camaquã	028		Camaquã
Camaquã	028		Cerro Grande do Sul
Camaquã	028		Chuvisca
Camaquã	028		Dom Feliciano
Camaquã	028		Sentinela do Sul
Camaquã	028		Tapes

=== Southwest Rio-Grandense Mesoregion ===
Microregion	Code	Location	Counties
Campanha Ocidental	029		Alegrete
Campanha Ocidental	029		Barra do Quaraí
Campanha Ocidental	029		Garruchos
Campanha Ocidental	029		Itaqui
Campanha Ocidental	029		Maçambará
Campanha Ocidental	029		Manoel Viana
Campanha Ocidental	029		Quaraí
Campanha Ocidental	029		São Borja
Campanha Ocidental	029		São Francisco de Assis
Campanha Ocidental	029		Uruguaiana
Campanha Central	030		Rosário do Sul
Campanha Central	030		Santa Margarida do Sul
Campanha Central	030		Sant'Ana do Livramento
Campanha Central	030		São Gabriel
Campanha Meridional	031		Aceguá
Campanha Meridional	031		Bagé
Campanha Meridional	031		Dom Pedrito
Campanha Meridional	031		Hulha Negra
Campanha Meridional	031		Lavras do Sul

=== Southeast Rio-Grandense Mesoregion ===
Microregion	Code	Location	Counties
Serras de Sudeste	032		Amaral Ferrador
Serras de Sudeste	032		Caçapava do Sul
Serras de Sudeste	032		Candiota
Serras de Sudeste	032		Encruzilhada do Sul
Serras de Sudeste	032		Pinheiro Machado
Serras de Sudeste	032		Piratini
Serras de Sudeste	032		Santana da Boa Vista
Pelotas	033		Arroio do Padre
Pelotas	033		Canguçu
Pelotas	033		Capão do Leão
Pelotas	033		Cerrito
Pelotas	033		Cristal
Pelotas	033		Morro Redondo
Pelotas	033		Pedro Osório
Pelotas	033		Pelotas
Pelotas	033		São Lourenço do Sul
Pelotas	033		Turuçu
Jaguarão	034		Arroio Grande
Jaguarão	034		Herval
Jaguarão	034		Jaguarão
Jaguarão	034		Pedras Altas
Litoral Lagunar	035		Chuí
Litoral Lagunar	035		Rio Grande
Litoral Lagunar	035		Santa Vitória do Palmar
Litoral Lagunar	035		São José do Norte

== See also ==
- List of municipalities in Rio Grande do Sul
- Physiography of Rio Grande do Sul
