= Vanini =

Vanini may refer to:

- Lucilio Vanini, also known under the pen name Giulio Cesare Vanini (1585-1619), Italian freethinker
- Vanina Vanini, novella by Stendhal
- Vanini (Brazil), municipality in Rio Grande do Sul
