= Alto Alegre =

Alto Alegre may refer to one of the following Brazilian cities:

- Alto Alegre, Rio Grande do Sul
- Alto Alegre, Roraima
- Alto Alegre, São Paulo
