= Nova Boa Vista =

Municipality in Rio Grande do Sul, Brazil

Coordinates: 27°59′38″S 52°58′44″W

- Municipality
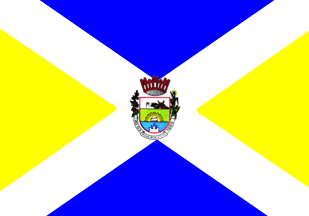
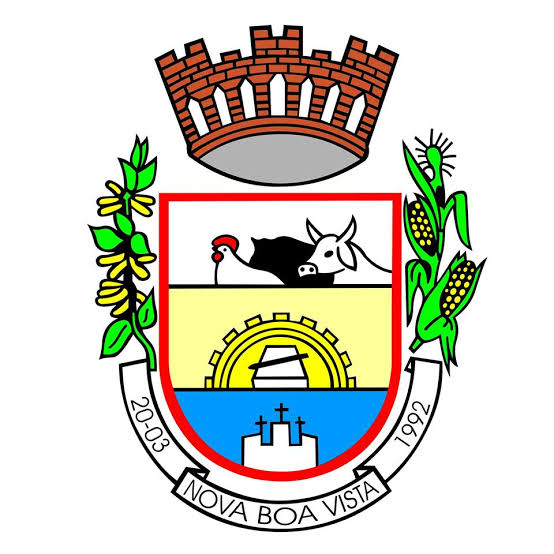
- Flag Coat of arms
- Interactive map of Nova Boa Vista
- Country: Brazil
- Time zone: UTC−3 (BRT)

Nova Boa Vista is a municipality in the state of Rio Grande do Sul, Brazil. As of 2020, the estimated population was 1,753.

== See also ==
- List of municipalities in Rio Grande do Sul
