= Três Palmeiras =

Municipality in Rio Grande do Sul, Brazil

Coordinates: 3°35′S 51°48′W

- Municipality
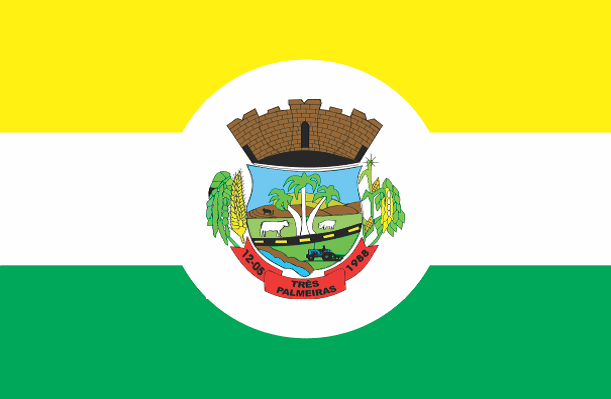
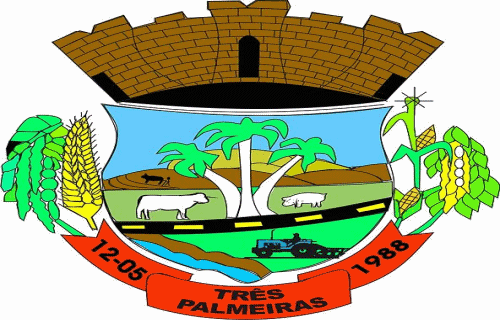
- Flag Coat of arms
- Interactive map of Três Palmeiras
- Country: Brazil
- Time zone: UTC−3 (BRT)

Três Palmeiras is a municipality in the state of Rio Grande do Sul, Brazil. As of 2020, the estimated population was 4,251.

== See also ==
- List of municipalities in Rio Grande do Sul
