= Maximiliano de Almeida =

Municipality in Rio Grande do Sul, Brazil

Coordinates: 27°38′S 51°47′W

- Municipality
- Flag Coat of arms
- Interactive map of Maximiliano de Almeida
- Country: Brazil
- Time zone: UTC−3 (BRT)

Maximiliano de Almeida is a municipality in the state of Rio Grande do Sul, Brazil. As of 2020, the estimated population was 4,314.

== See also ==
- List of municipalities in Rio Grande do Sul
