= Santa Cecília do Sul =

Municipality of Rio Grande do Sul, Brazil

- Municipality
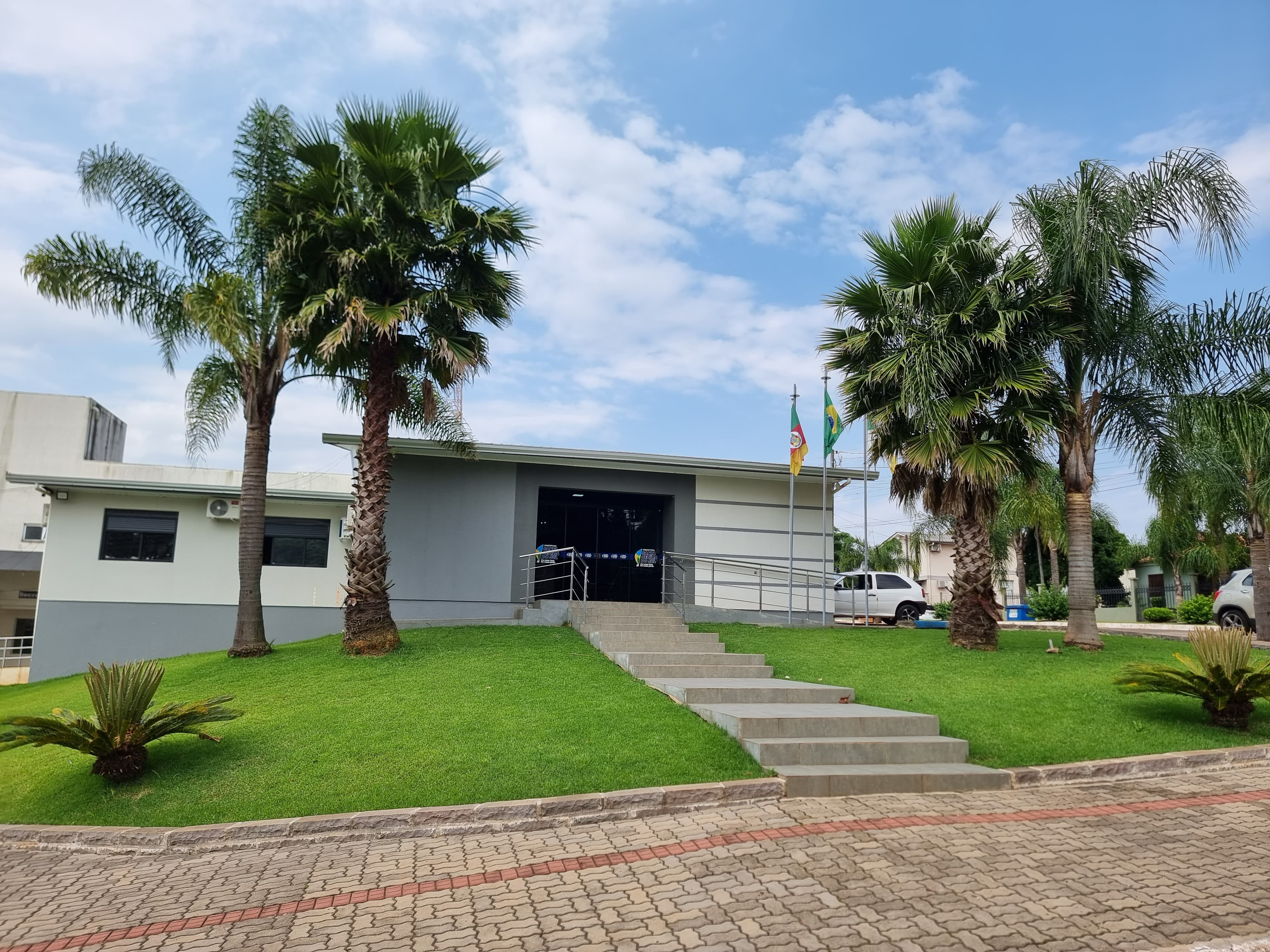

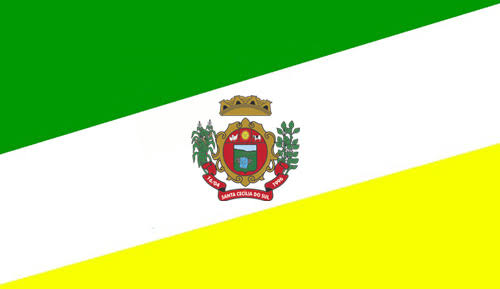
- Flag Coat of arms

- Location of Santa Cecília do Sul in Rio Grande do Sul

- Location in Brazil
- Coordinates: 28°9′43″S 51°55′30″W
- Country: Brazil
- Region: Southern
- State: Rio Grande do Sul
- Mesoregion: Noroeste Rio-Grandense

Population (2020)
  - Total: 1,634
- Time zone: UTC−3 (BRT)

Santa Cecília do Sul is a municipality in the state of Rio Grande do Sul in the southern region of Brazil.

Santa Cecília do Sul was a district belonging to Tapejara, until it became independent in 1996.

== See also ==
- List of municipalities in Rio Grande do Sul
