= Miraguaí =

Municipality in Rio Grande do Sul, Brazil

Coordinates: 27°29′38″S 53°41′09″W

- Municipality
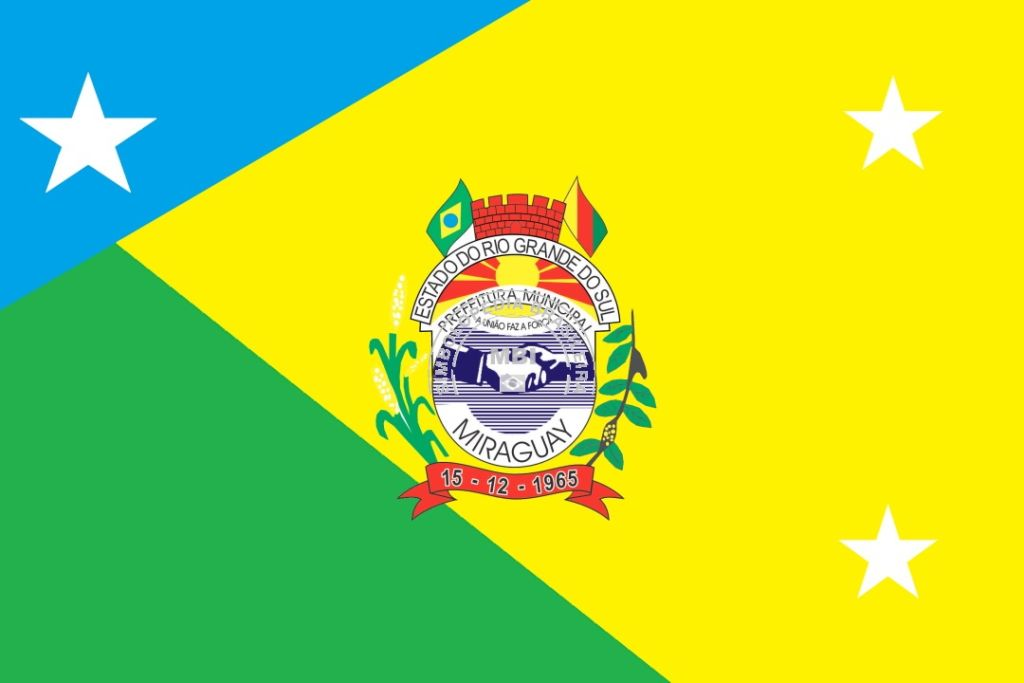
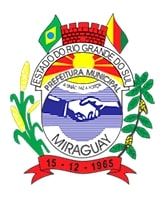
- Flag Coat of arms

- Location of Miraguaí in Rio Grande do Sul
- Country: Brazil
- Region: South
- State: Rio Grande do Sul
- Mesoregion: Noroeste Rio-Grandense
- Microregion: Três Passos
- Founded: 15 December 1965

Government
  - Mayor: Valdelirio Pretto da Silva (PT, 2021 - 2024)

Area
  - Total: 131.236 km^{2} (50.671 sq mi)

Population (2021)
  - Total: 4,899
  - Density: 37.33/km^{2} (96.68/sq mi)
- Time zone: UTC−3 (BRT)
- Website: Official website

Miraguaí is a municipality in the state of Rio Grande do Sul, Brazil. As of 2020, the estimated population was 4,911.

== See also ==
- List of municipalities in Rio Grande do Sul
