= Barra do Guarita =

Municipality in Rio Grande do Sul, Brazil

Coordinates: 27°11′31″S 53°42′36″W

- Municipality
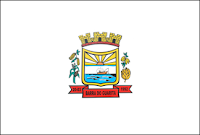
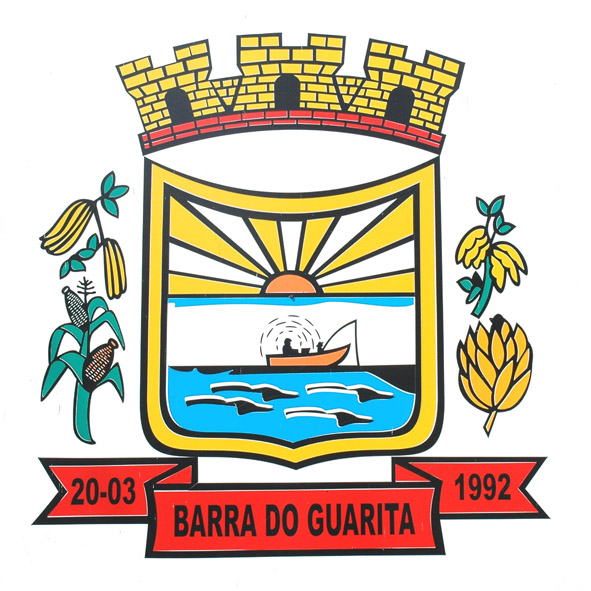
- Flag Coat of arms

- Location of Barra do Guarita in Rio Grande do Sul
- Country: Brazil
- Region: South
- State: Rio Grande do Sul
- Mesoregion: Noroeste Rio-Grandense
- Microregion: Três Passos
- Founded: 20 March 1992

Government
  - Mayor: Rodrigo Locatelli Tisott (PT, 2021 - 2024)

Area
  - Total: 62.801 km^{2} (24.248 sq mi)

Population (2021)
  - Total: 3,266
  - Density: 52.01/km^{2} (134.7/sq mi)
- Demonym: Guaritense
- Time zone: UTC−3 (BRT)
- Website: Official website

Barra do Guarita is a municipality in the state of Rio Grande do Sul, Brazil. As of 2020, the estimated population was 3,257.

== See also ==
- List of municipalities in Rio Grande do Sul
