= Mormaço =

Municipality of Rio Grande do Sul, Brazil

- Municipality
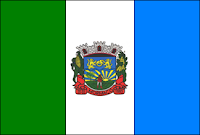
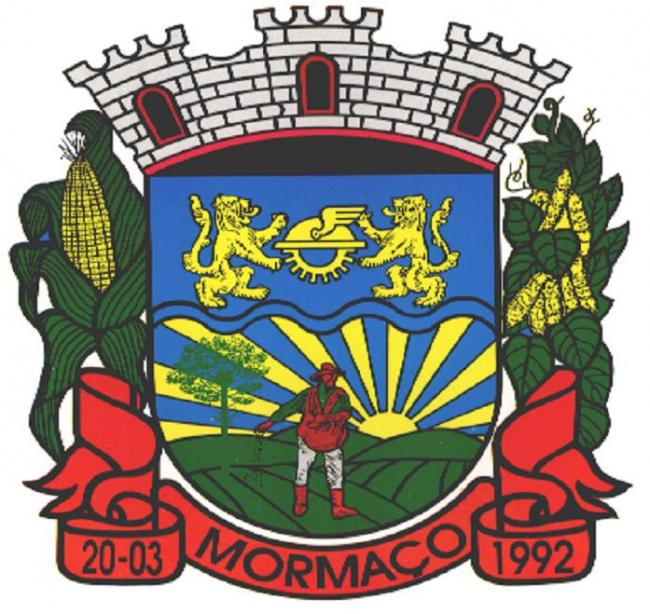
- Flag Coat of arms
- Motto: "Mormaço para todos"
- Location of Mormaço in Rio Grande do Sul

- Location within Brazil
- Coordinates: 28°41′31″S 52°41′31″W
- Country: Brazil
- State: Rio Grande do Sul
- Founded: March 20, 1992

Area
  - Total: 146.109 km^{2} (56.413 sq mi)
- Elevation: 410 m (1,350 ft)

Population (2020)
  - Total: 3,113
  - Density: 21.31/km^{2} (55.18/sq mi)
- Demonym: Mormacense
- Time zone: UTC−3 (BRT)

Mormaço is a municipality in the state of Rio Grande do Sul, Brazil.

== See also ==
- List of municipalities in Rio Grande do Sul
