= Novo Xingu =

Municipality of Rio Grande do Sul, Brazil

- Municipality
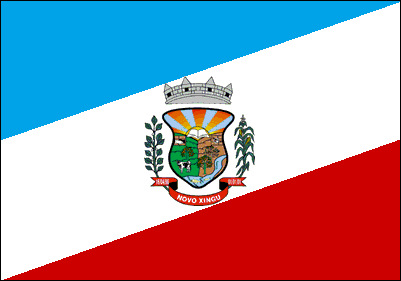
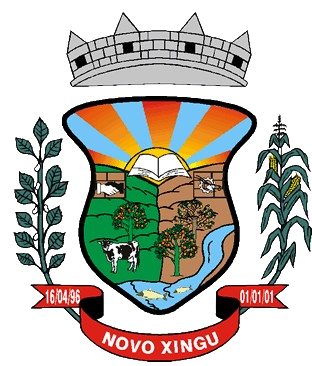
- Flag Coat of arms

- Location in Brazil
- Coordinates: 27°44′49″S 53°3′18″W
- Country: Brazil
- Region: Southern
- State: Rio Grande do Sul
- Mesoregion: Noroeste Rio-Grandense

Population (2020)
  - Total: 1,712
- Time zone: UTC−3 (BRT)
- Postal code: 99687-000
- Website: novoxingu.rs.gov.br

Novo Xingu is a municipality in the state of Rio Grande do Sul in the Southern Region of Brazil.

== See also ==
- List of municipalities in Rio Grande do Sul
