= Muliterno =

Municipality in Rio Grande do Sul, Brazil

Coordinates: 28°20′S 51°46′W

- Municipality
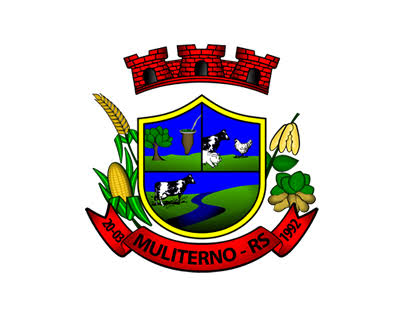
- Flag Coat of arms
- Interactive map of Muliterno
- Country: Brazil
- Time zone: UTC−3 (BRT)

Muliterno is a municipality in the state of Rio Grande do Sul, Brazil. As of 2020, the estimated population was 1,897.

== See also ==
- List of municipalities in Rio Grande do Sul
