= Riozinho =

Municipality of Rio Grande do Sul, Brazil

- Municipality
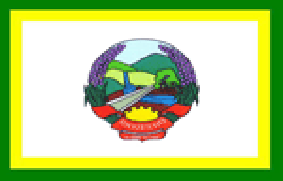
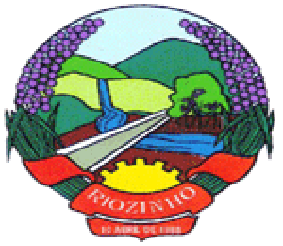
- Flag Coat of arms

- Location within Rio Grande do Sul

- Location in Brazil
- Coordinates: 29°38′27″S 50°27′10″W
- Country: Brazil
- State: Rio Grande do Sul

Population (2020)
  - Total: 4,676
- Time zone: UTC−3 (BRT)

Riozinho is a municipality in the state of Rio Grande do Sul, Brazil.

== See also ==
- List of municipalities in Rio Grande do Sul
