= Almirante Tamandaré do Sul =

Municipality of Rio Grande do Sul, Brazil

- Municipality
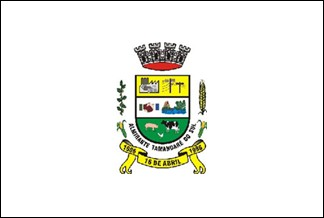
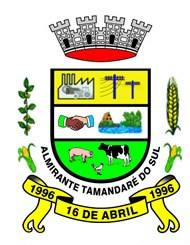
- Flag Coat of arms

- Location in Brazil
- Coordinates: 28°6′46″S 52°54′32″W
- Country: Brazil
- Region: Southern
- State: Rio Grande do Sul
- Mesoregion: Noroeste Rio-Grandense

Government
  - Mayor: Adir Giacomini (PP)

Population (2020)
  - Total: 1,949
- Time zone: UTC−3 (BRT)

Almirante Tamandaré do Sul is a municipality in the state of Rio Grande do Sul in the Southern Region of Brazil.

Its population is roughly 1,949 inhabitants (data from 2020). The main economic sector of Almirante Tamandaré do Sul is agriculture. Soybeans, corn and wheat are the town's main products.

== See also ==
- List of municipalities in Rio Grande do Sul
