= Itapuca =

Municipality in Rio Grande do Sul, Brazil

Coordinates: 28°54′S 52°03′W

- Municipality
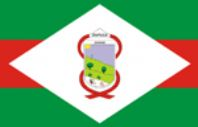
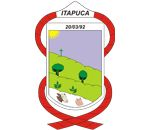
- Flag Coat of arms
- Interactive map of Itapuca
- Country: Brazil
- Time zone: UTC−3 (BRT)

Itapuca is a Brazilian municipality in the state of Rio Grande do Sul.

It is located at 28º53'43" S latitude and 52º02'12" W longitude, with an elevation of 660 meters above sea level. Its population in 2020 was estimated at 2,065 inhabitants. It has a surface area of 184.48 km^{2}.
