= Tunas, Rio Grande do Sul =

Municipality of Rio Grande do Sul, Brazil

Coordinates: 29°06′10″S 52°57′21″W

Tunas
- Municipality
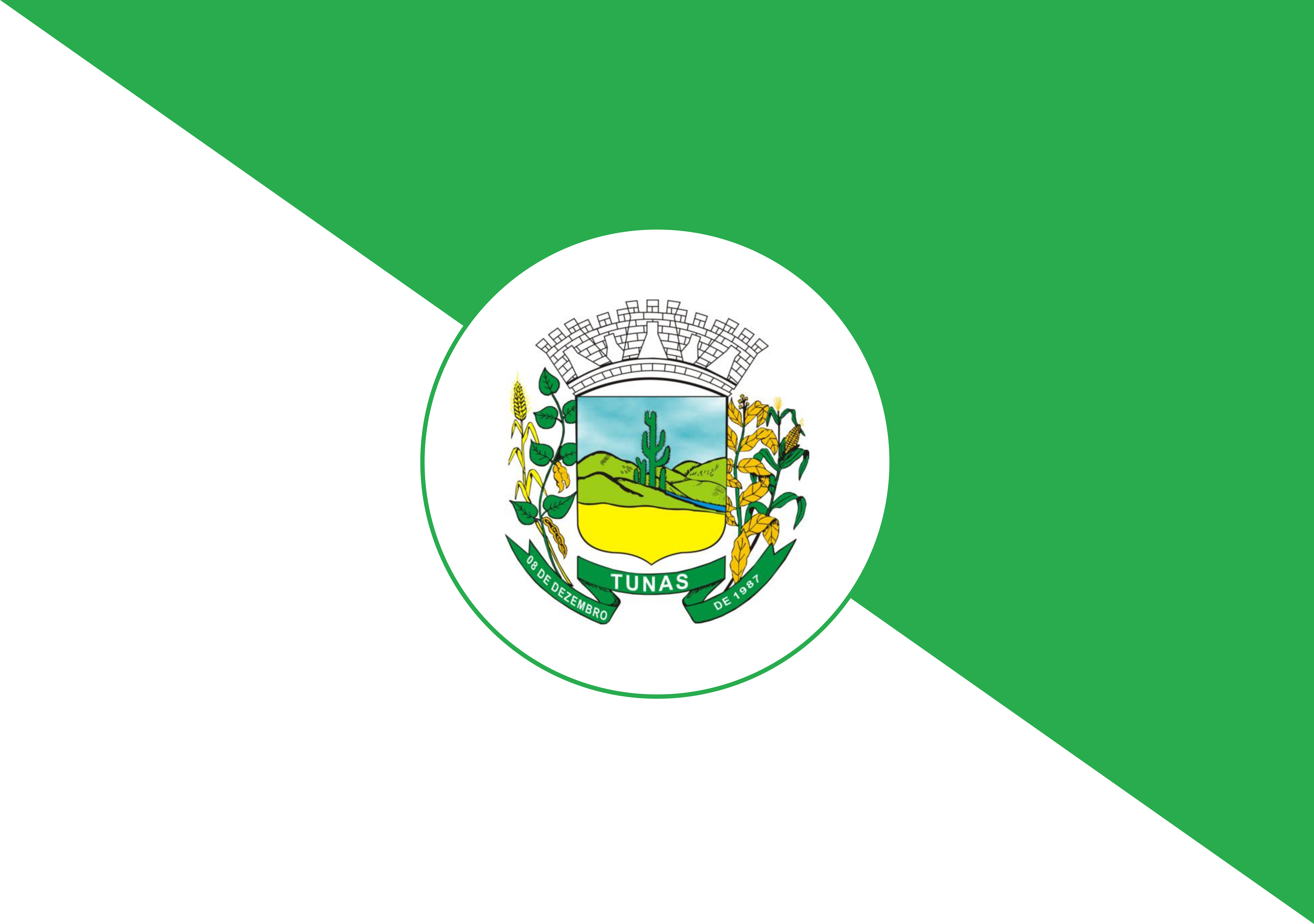
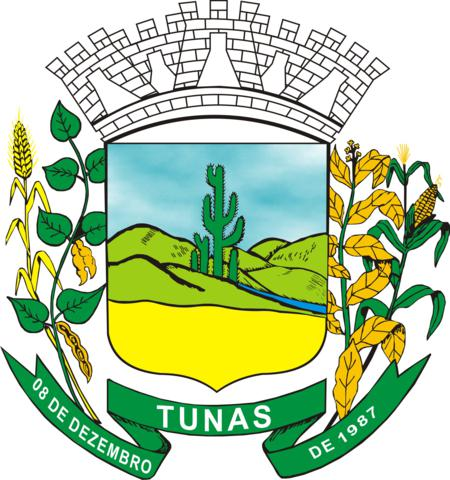
- Flag Coat of arms

- Location of Tunas in Rio Grande do Sul
- Country: Brazil
- Region: South
- State: Rio Grande do Sul
- Mesoregion: Noroeste Rio-Grandense
- Microregion: Soledad
- Founded: 12 August 1987

Government
  - Mayor: Paulo Henrique Reuter (PRD, 2021 - 2024)

Area
  - Total: 217.302 km^{2} (83.901 sq mi)

Population (2021)
  - Total: 4,585
  - Density: 21.10/km^{2} (54.65/sq mi)
- Demonym: Tunense
- Time zone: UTC−3 (BRT)
- Website: Official website

Tunas is a municipality in the state of Rio Grande do Sul, Brazil. As of 2020, the estimated population was 4,577.

== See also ==
- List of municipalities in Rio Grande do Sul
