= São João da Urtiga =

Municipality in Rio Grande do Sul, Brazil

Coordinates: 27°49′12″S 51°49′40″W

- Municipality
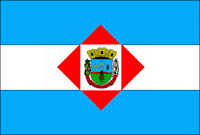
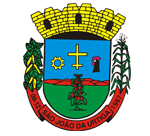
- Flag Coat of arms
- Interactive map of São João da Urtiga
- Country: Brazil
- Time zone: UTC−3 (BRT)

São João da Urtiga is a municipality in the state of Rio Grande do Sul, Brazil. As of 2020, the estimated population was 4,641.

== See also ==
- List of municipalities in Rio Grande do Sul
