= Pinheirinho do Vale =

Municipality in Rio Grande do Sul, Brazil

Coordinates: 27°12′36″S 53°36′43″W

- Municipality
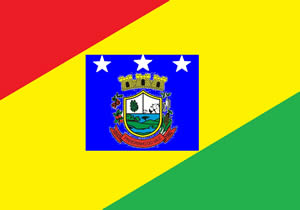
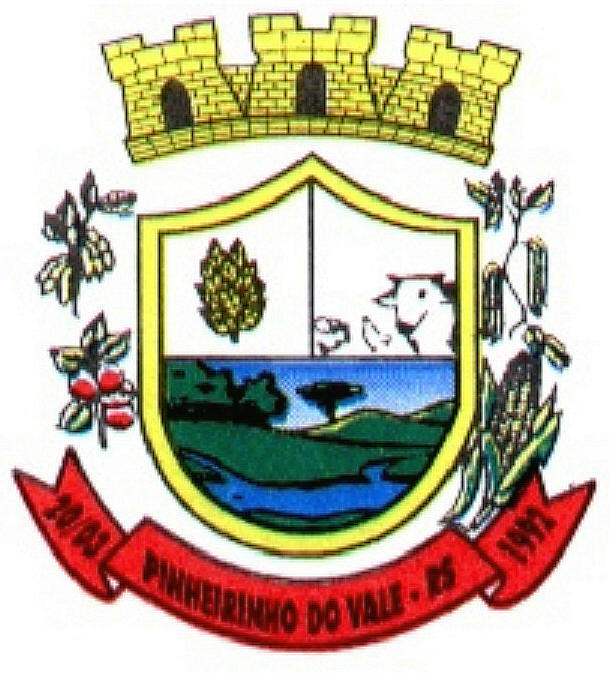
- Flag Coat of arms
- Interactive map of Pinheirinho do Vale
- Country: Brazil
- Time zone: UTC−3 (BRT)

Pinheirinho do Vale is a municipality in the state of Rio Grande do Sul, Brazil. As of 2020, the estimated population was 4,899.

== See also ==
- List of municipalities in Rio Grande do Sul
