= Sentinela do Sul =

Municipality of Rio Grande do Sul, Brazil

- Municipality
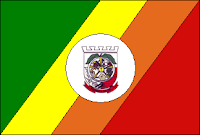
- Flag

- Location within Rio Grande do Sul

- Location in Brazil
- Coordinates: 30°36′39″S 51°34′44″W
- Country: Brazil
- State: Rio Grande do Sul

Population (2020)
  - Total: 5,609
- Time zone: UTC−3 (BRT)

Sentinela do Sul (Portuguese of South Sentinel) is a municipality in the state of Rio Grande do Sul, Brazil.

== See also ==
- List of municipalities in Rio Grande do Sul
