= Faxinalzinho =

Brazilian municipality

Coordinates: 24°00′S 51°27′W

- Municipality
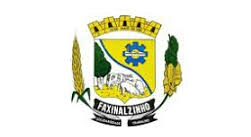
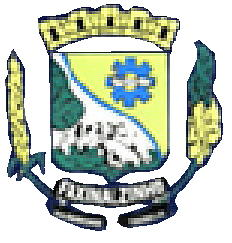
- Flag Coat of arms
- Interactive map of Faxinalzinho
- Country: Brazil
- Time zone: UTC−3 (BRT)

Faxinalzinho is a municipality in the state of Rio Grande do Sul, Brazil. As of 2020, the estimated population was 2,284.

== See also ==
- List of municipalities in Rio Grande do Sul
