= Novo Tiradentes =

Human settlement in Brazil

Coordinates: 27°33′46″S 53°10′55″W

- Municipality
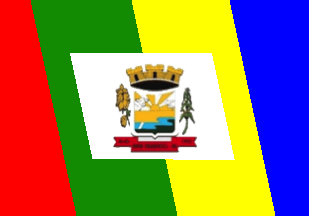
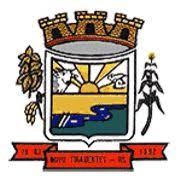
- Flag Coat of arms
- Interactive map of Novo Tiradentes
- Country: Brazil
- Time zone: UTC−3 (BRT)

Novo Tiradentes is a municipality in the state of Rio Grande do Sul, Brazil. As of 2020, the estimated population was 2,200.

== See also ==
- List of municipalities in Rio Grande do Sul
