= Paverama =

Municipality of Rio Grande do Sul, Brazil

- Municipality
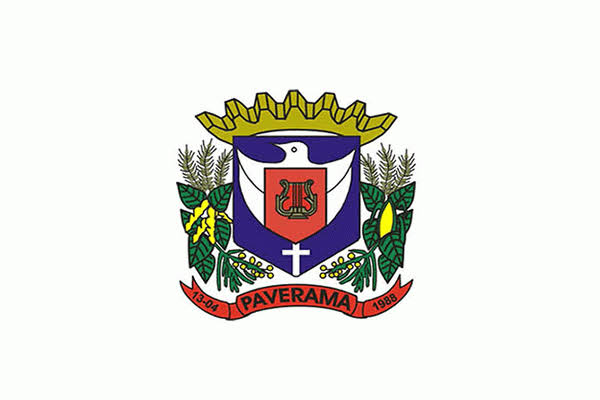
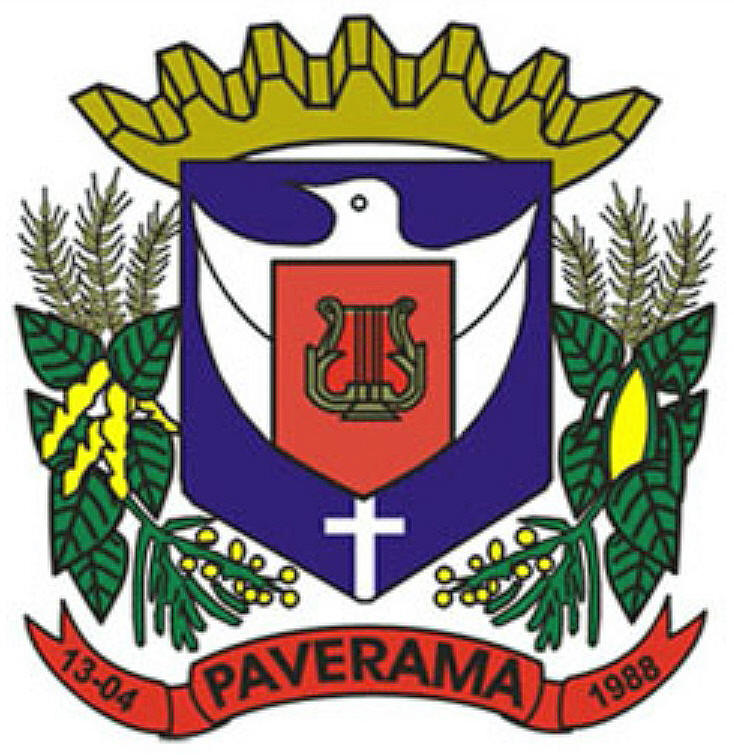
- Flag Coat of arms

- Location within Rio Grande do Sul

- Location in Brazil
- Coordinates: 29°33′S 51°46′W
- Country: Brazil
- State: Rio Grande do Sul

Government
  - Mayor: Fabiano Merence Brandão (2021-2023)

Population (2022)
  - Total: 7,978
- Time zone: UTC−3 (BRT)
- Area/distance code: 51
- Website: paverama.rs.gov.br

Paverama is a municipality in the state of Rio Grande do Sul, Brazil.

== See also ==
- List of municipalities in Rio Grande do Sul
