= São José do Herval =

Municipality in Rio Grande do Sul, Brazil

Coordinates: 29°02′38″S 52°17′45″W

- Municipality
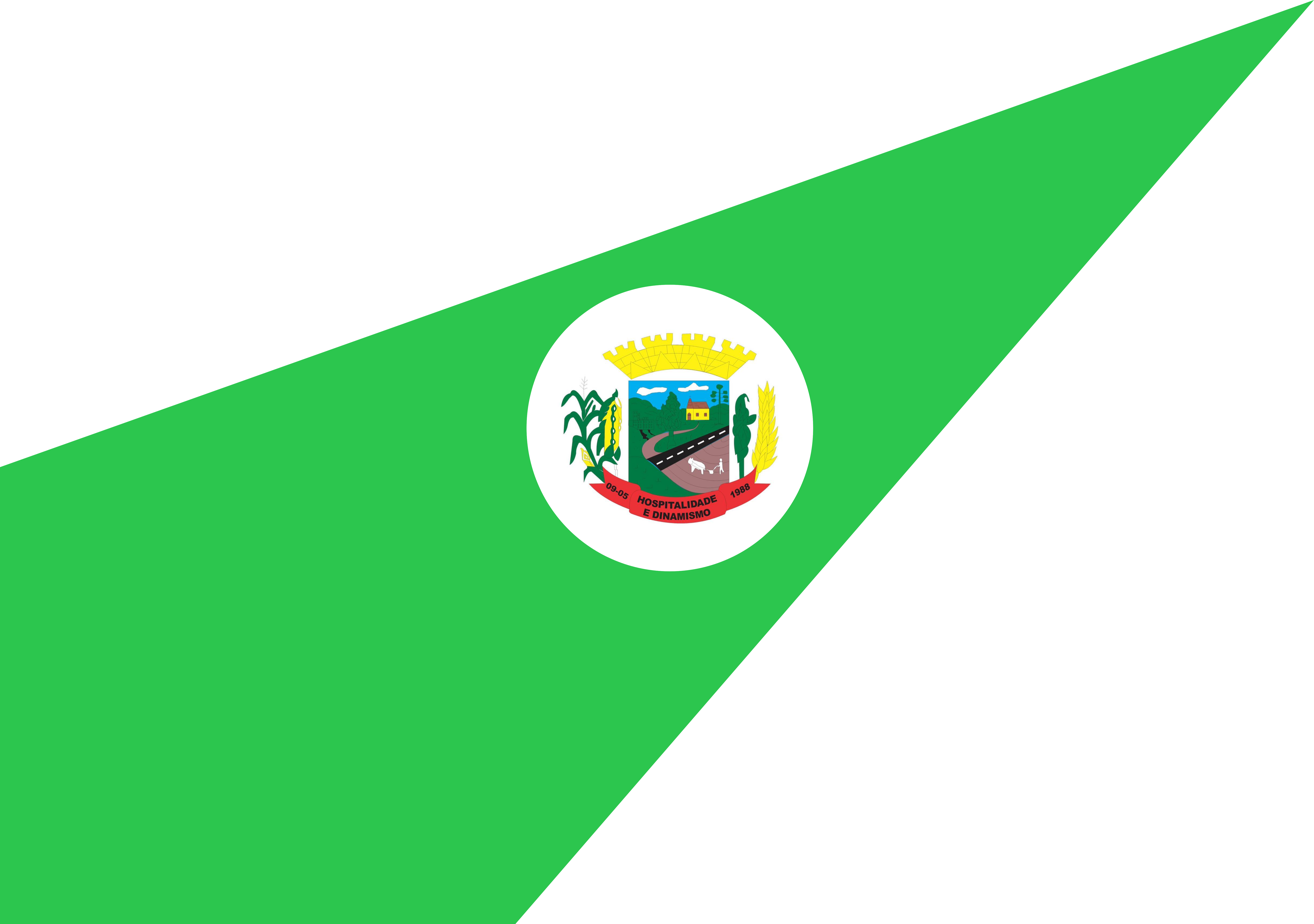
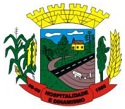
- Flag Coat of arms

- Location of São José do Herval in Rio Grande do Sul
- Country: Brazil
- Region: South
- State: Rio Grande do Sul
- Mesoregion: Noroeste Rio-Grandense
- Microregion: Soledad
- Founded: 9 May 1988

Government
  - Mayor: Jovani Bozetti (PDT, 2021–2024)

Area
  - Total: 103.094 km^{2} (39.805 sq mi)

Population (2021)
  - Total: 1,917
  - Density: 18.59/km^{2} (48.16/sq mi)
- Demonym: Hervalense
- Time zone: UTC−3 (BRT)
- Website: Official website

São José do Herval is a municipality in the state of Rio Grande do Sul, Brazil, commonly known as Dead Donkey (Burro Morto) by the inhabitants of the region. As of 2020, the estimated population was 1,943.

== See also ==
- List of municipalities in Rio Grande do Sul
