= Pinhal, Rio Grande do Sul =

Municipality in Rio Grande do Sul, Brazil

- Municipality
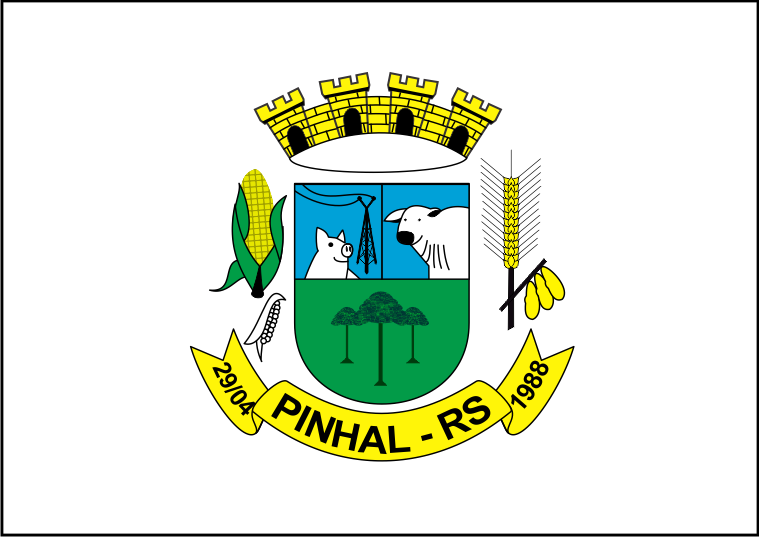
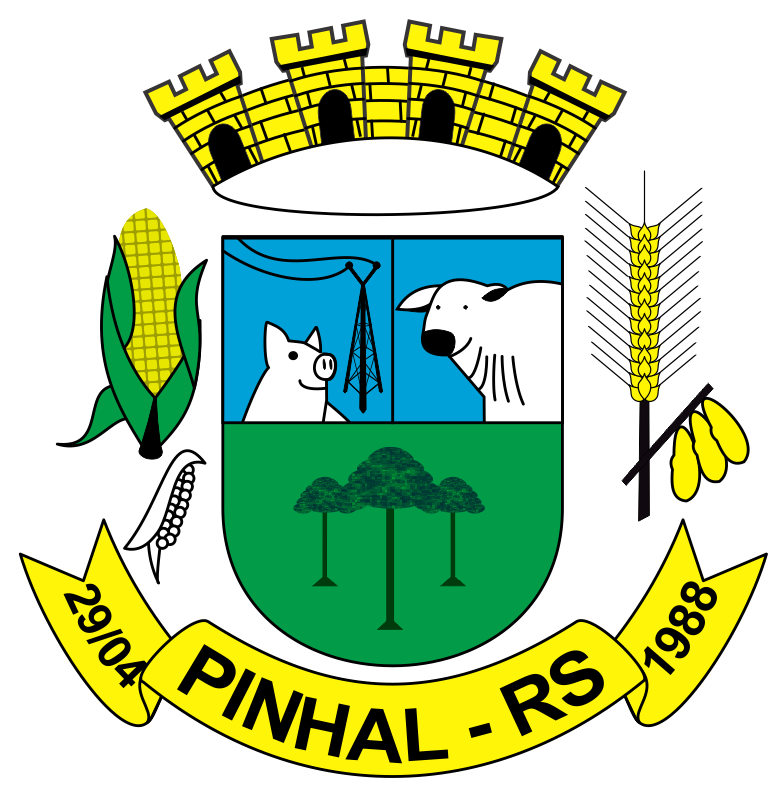
- Flag Coat of arms
- Interactive map of Pinhal, Rio Grande do Sul
- Country: Brazil
- Time zone: UTC−3 (BRT)

Pinhal (27°30′39″S 53°12′54″W) is a municipality in the state of Rio Grande do Sul, Brazil. It is situated at 368 m above sea level and its estimated population in 2020 was 2,580. It has an area of 72,6 km^{2}

== See also ==
- List of municipalities in Rio Grande do Sul
