= Mato Castelhano =

Municipality in Rio Grande do Sul, Brazil

Coordinates: 28°16′40″S 52°11′31″W

- Municipality
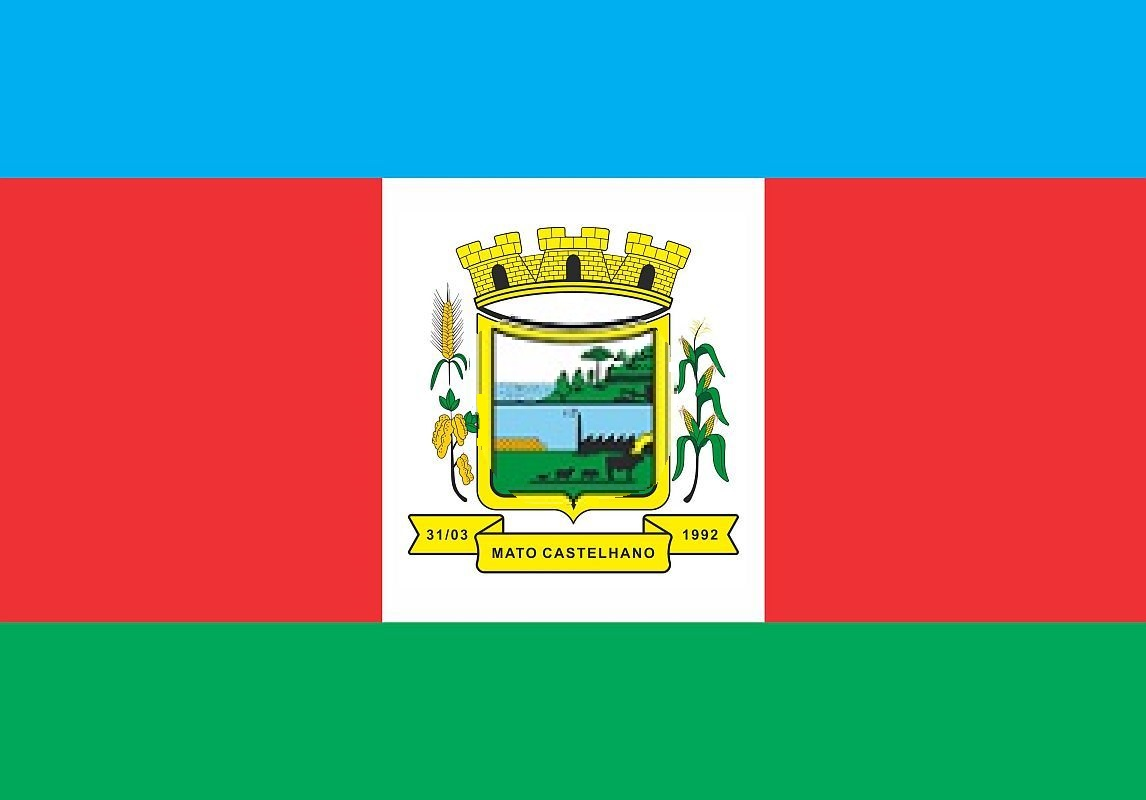
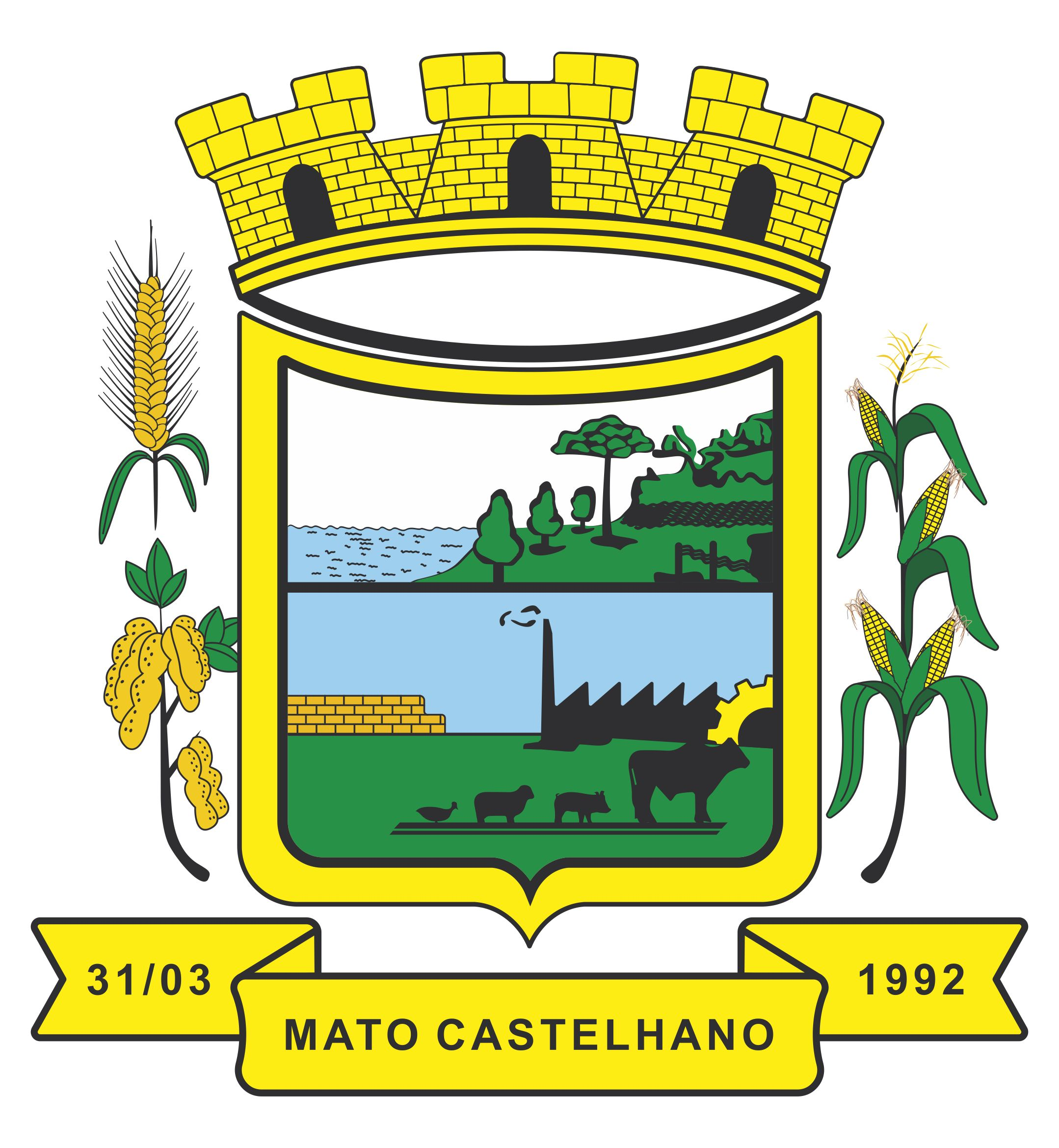
- Flag Coat of arms
- Interactive map of Mato Castelhano
- Country: Brazil
- Time zone: UTC−3 (BRT)

Mato Castelhano is a municipality in the state of Rio Grande do Sul, Brazil. As of 2022, the estimated population was 2,553.

== See also ==
- List of municipalities in Rio Grande do Sul
