= Barra do Rio Azul =

Municipality in Rio Grande do Sul, Brazil

Coordinates: 27°23′S 52°26′W

- Municipality
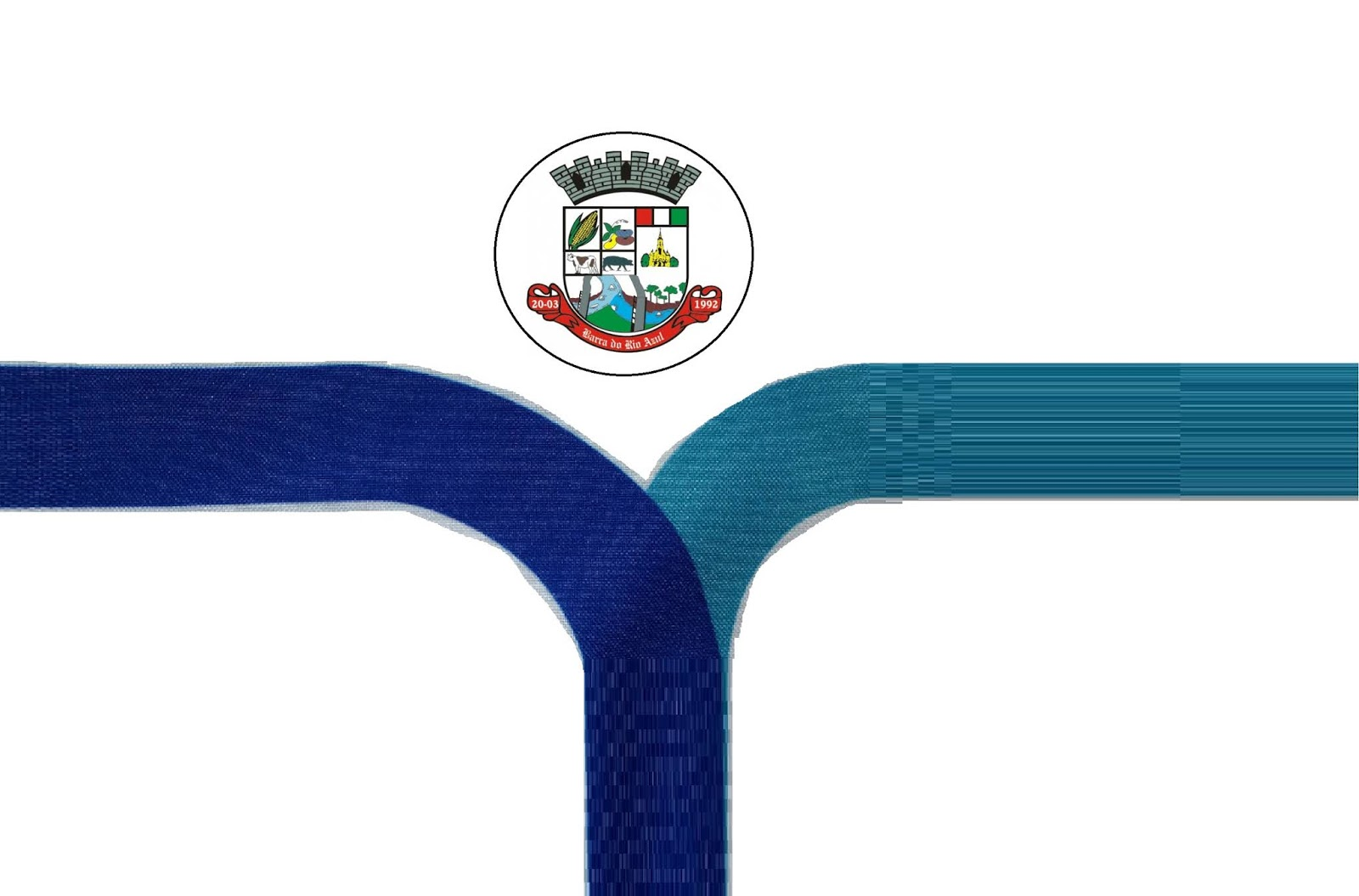
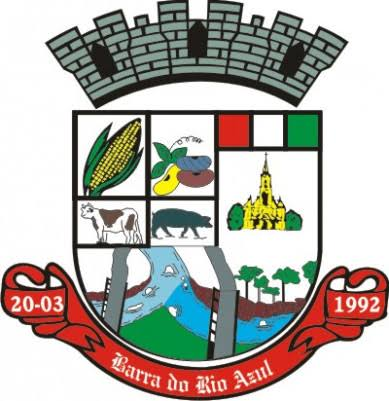
- Flag Coat of arms
- Interactive map of Barra do Rio Azul
- Country: Brazil
- Time zone: UTC−3 (BRT)

Barra do Rio Azul is a municipality in the state of Rio Grande do Sul, Brazil. As of 2020, the estimated population was 1,655.

== See also ==
- List of municipalities in Rio Grande do Sul
