= Tupanci do Sul =

Municipality in Rio Grande do Sul, Brazil

Coordinates: 27°55′30″S 51°32′09″W

- Municipality
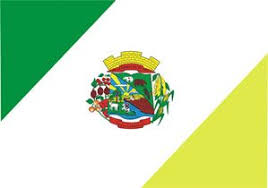
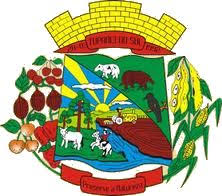
- Flag Coat of arms
- Interactive map of Tupanci do Sul
- Country: Brazil
- Time zone: UTC−3 (BRT)

Tupanci do Sul is a municipality in the state of Rio Grande do Sul, Brazil. As of 2020, the estimated population was 1,459.

== See also ==
- List of municipalities in Rio Grande do Sul
