= Vista Gaúcha =

Municipality in Rio Grande do Sul, Brazil

- Municipality
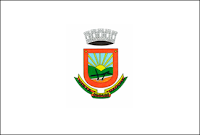
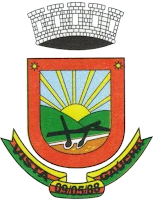
- Flag Coat of arms

- Location of Vista Gaúcha in Rio Grande do Sul
- Country: Brazil
- Region: South
- State: Rio Grande do Sul
- Mesoregion: Noroeste Rio-Grandense
- Microregion: Três Passos
- Founded: 9 May 1988

Government
  - Mayor: Claudemir José Locatelli (MDB, 2021 - 2024)

Area
  - Total: 90.022 km^{2} (34.758 sq mi)

Population (2021)
  - Total: 2,858
  - Density: 31.75/km^{2} (82.23/sq mi)
- Demonym: Vista Gauchense
- Time zone: UTC−3 (BRT)
- Website: Official website

Vista Gaúcha is a municipality in the state of Rio Grande do Sul, Brazil.

Vista Gaúcha is located in the northeast of the province, 480 km from the capital, Porto Alegre.

The population of the municipality was 2,855 people, according to the IBGE Demographic estimate of 2020.

Its area is 90.02 km², comprising .033% of the province, 0.0157% of the region, and 0.001% of the country.

Its IDH is .0784 per the Atlas de Desenvolvimento Humano/PNUD (2000).

== See also ==
- List of municipalities in Rio Grande do Sul
