= Victor Graeff =

Municipality in Rio Grande do Sul, Brazil

Coordinates: 28°33′36″S 52°44′52″W

- Municipality
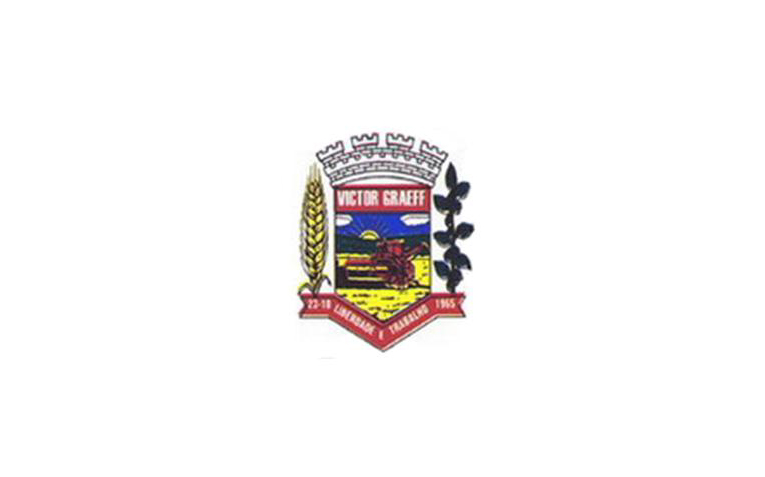
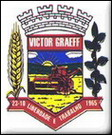
- Flag Coat of arms
- Interactive map of Victor Graeff
- Country: Brazil
- Time zone: UTC−3 (BRT)

Victor Graeff is a municipality in the state of Rio Grande do Sul, Brazil. As of 2020, the estimated population was 2,860.

== See also ==
- List of municipalities in Rio Grande do Sul
