= Travesseiro =

Municipality of Rio Grande do Sul, Brazil

- Municipality
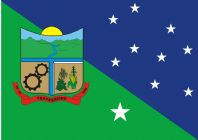
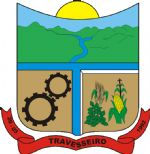
- Flag Coat of arms

- Location within Rio Grande do Sul

- Location in Brazil
- Coordinates: 29°17′38″S 52°03′18″W
- Country: Brazil
- State: Rio Grande do Sul

Population (2022)
  - Total: 2,152
- Time zone: UTC−3 (BRT)
- Website: travesseiro.rs.gov.br

Travesseiro is a municipality in the state of Rio Grande do Sul, Brazil.

== History ==
Colonised by German and Italian immigrants, the municipality freed itself from Arroio do Meio in 1992, the result of an free movement born in the 1980s. The name is due to being it being a place of crossing the Jacaré stream, current Forqueta River, being a point of passage through the water.

== See also ==
- List of municipalities in Rio Grande do Sul
