= Canudos do Vale =

Municipality of Rio Grande do Sul, Brazil

- Municipality
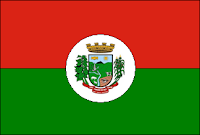
- Flag Coat of arms

- Location within Rio Grande do Sul

- Location in Brazil
- Coordinates: 29°19′22″S 52°14′02″W
- Country: Brazil
- State: Rio Grande do Sul

Area
  - Total: 82,555 km^{2} (31,875 sq mi)

Population (2022)
  - Total: 1,656
- Time zone: UTC−3 (BRT)
  - Summer (DST): UTC-2 (BRST)
- Postal code: 95933-000
- Area/distance code: 51

Canudos do Vale is a municipality in the state of Rio Grande do Sul, Brazil. By 2022, the population has reached 1,656.

== See also ==
- List of municipalities in Rio Grande do Sul
