= Ibirapuitã =

Municipality in Rio Grande do Sul, Brazil

Coordinates: 28°34′S 52°33′W

- Municipality
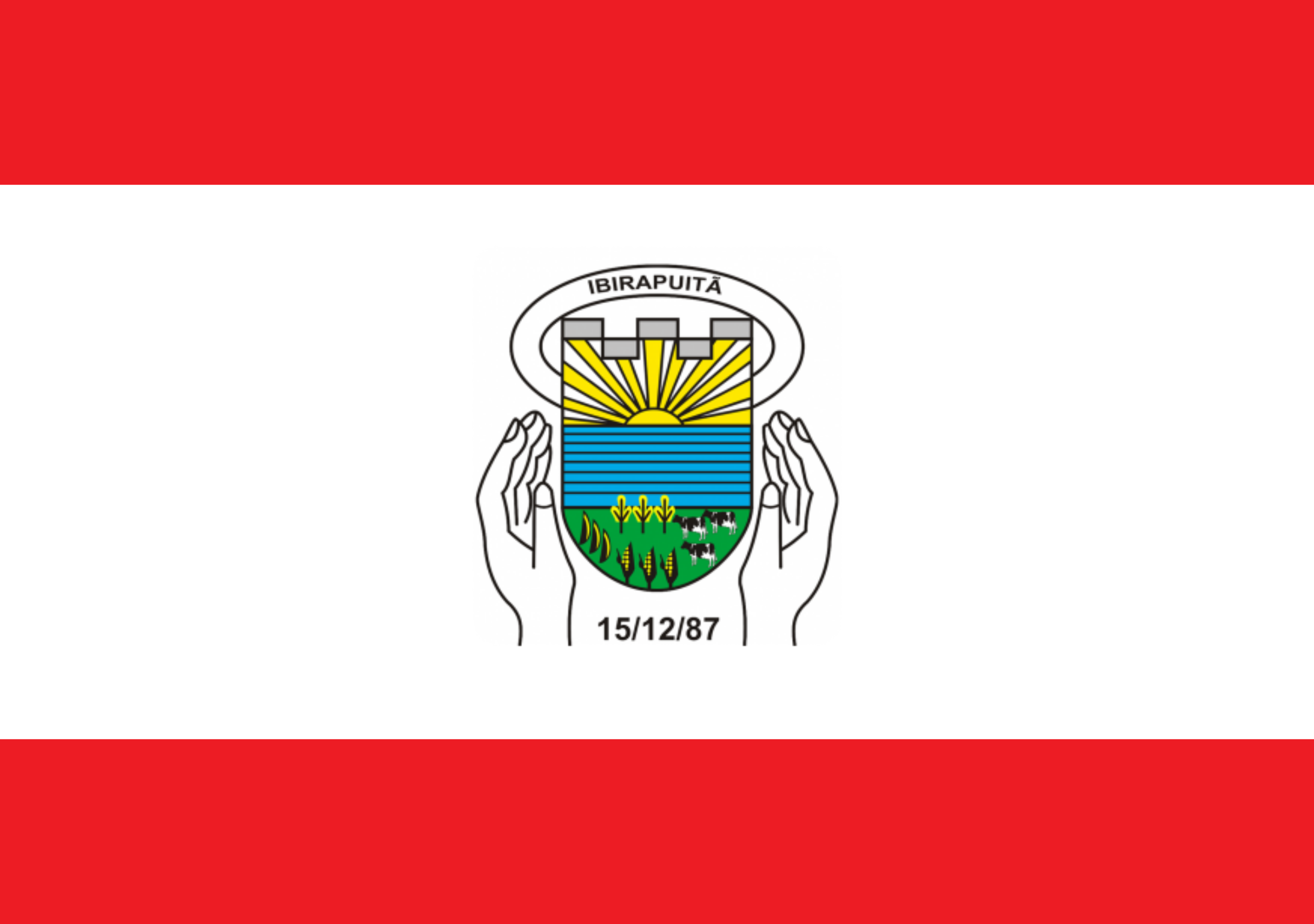
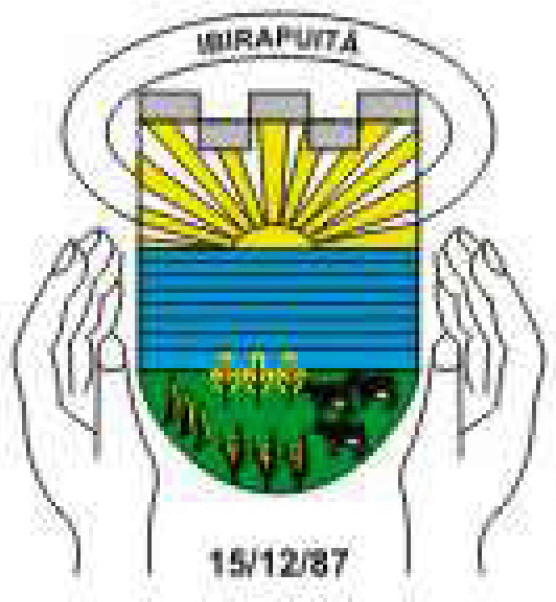
- Flag Coat of arms
- Motto: "Governo Para Todos"
- Location of Ibirapuitã in Rio Grande do Sul
- Country: Brazil
- Region: South
- State: Rio Grande do Sul
- Mesoregion: Noroeste Rio-Grandense
- Microregion: Soledad
- Founded: 15 December 1987

Government
  - Mayor: Jose Nicolodi Provenci (MDB, 2021–2024)

Area
  - Total: 307.164 km^{2} (118.597 sq mi)

Population (2021)
  - Total: 3,988
  - Density: 12.98/km^{2} (33.63/sq mi)
- Demonym: Ibirapuitense
- Time zone: UTC−3 (BRT)
- Website: Official website

Ibirapuitã is a municipality in the state of Rio Grande do Sul, Brazil. As of 2020, the estimated population was 4,000.

== See also ==
- List of municipalities in Rio Grande do Sul
