= Pejuçara =

Municipality in Rio Grande do Sul, Brazil

Coordinates: 28°26′S 53°38′W

- Municipality
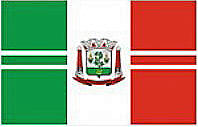
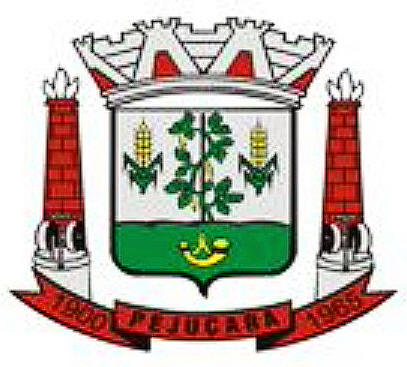
- Flag Coat of arms
- Interactive map of Pejuçara
- Country: Brazil
- Time zone: UTC−3 (BRT)

Pejuçara is a municipality in the state of Rio Grande do Sul, Brazil. As of 2020, the estimated population was 3,857.

== See also ==
- List of municipalities in Rio Grande do Sul
