= Progresso, Rio Grande do Sul =

Municipality of Rio Grande do Sul, Brazil

Progresso
- Municipality
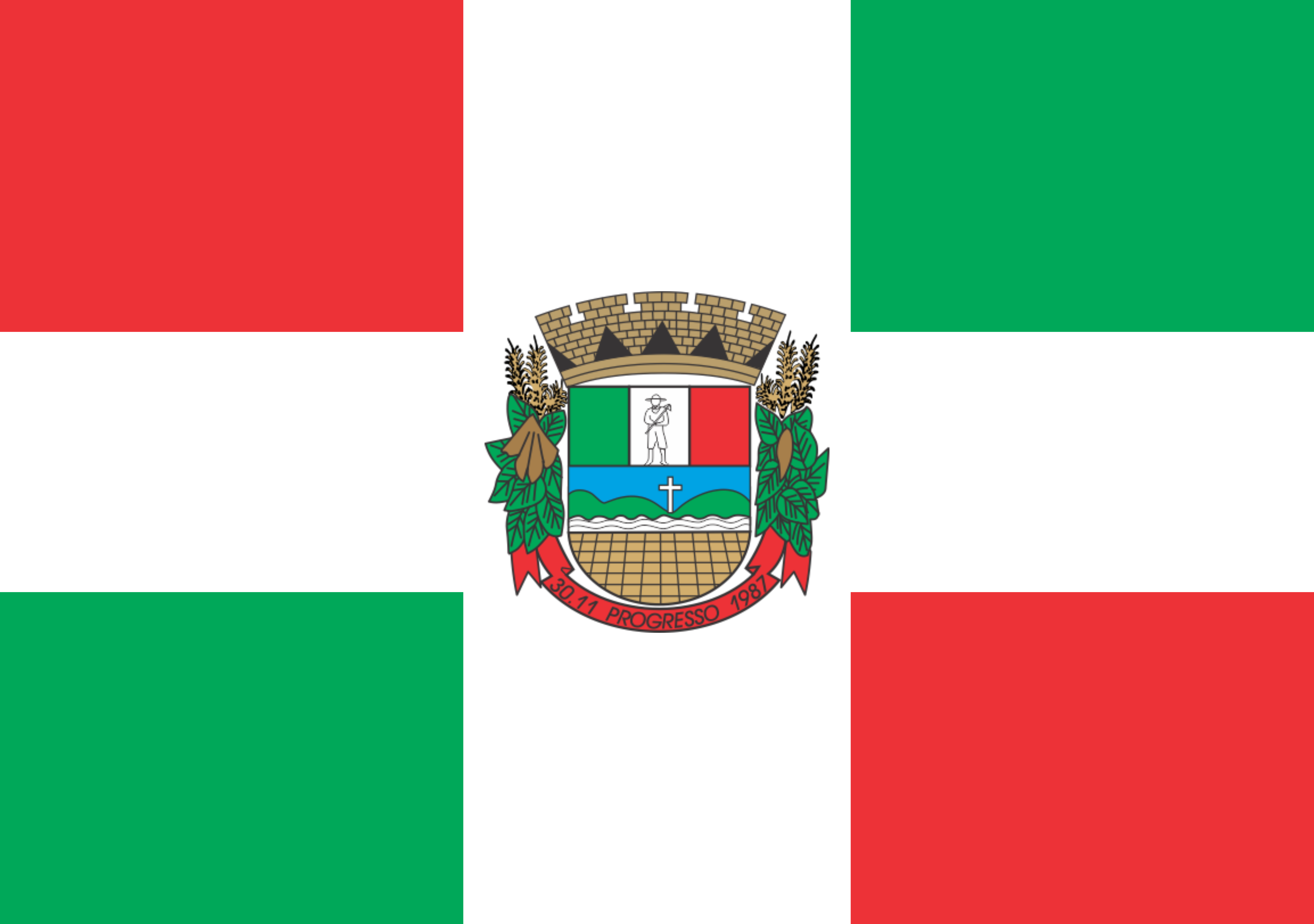
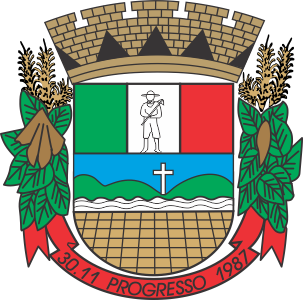
- Flag Coat of arms

- Location within Rio Grande do Sul

- Location in Brazil
- Coordinates: 29°14′38″S 52°18′43″W
- Country: Brazil
- State: Rio Grande do Sul

Population (2022)
  - Total: 5,340
- Time zone: UTC−3 (BRT)

Progresso is a municipality in the state of Rio Grande do Sul, Brazil.

== See also ==
- List of municipalities in Rio Grande do Sul
