= Sagrada Família, Rio Grande do Sul =

Municipality in Rio Grande do Sul, Brazil

Coordinates: 20°35′S 40°42′W

- Municipality
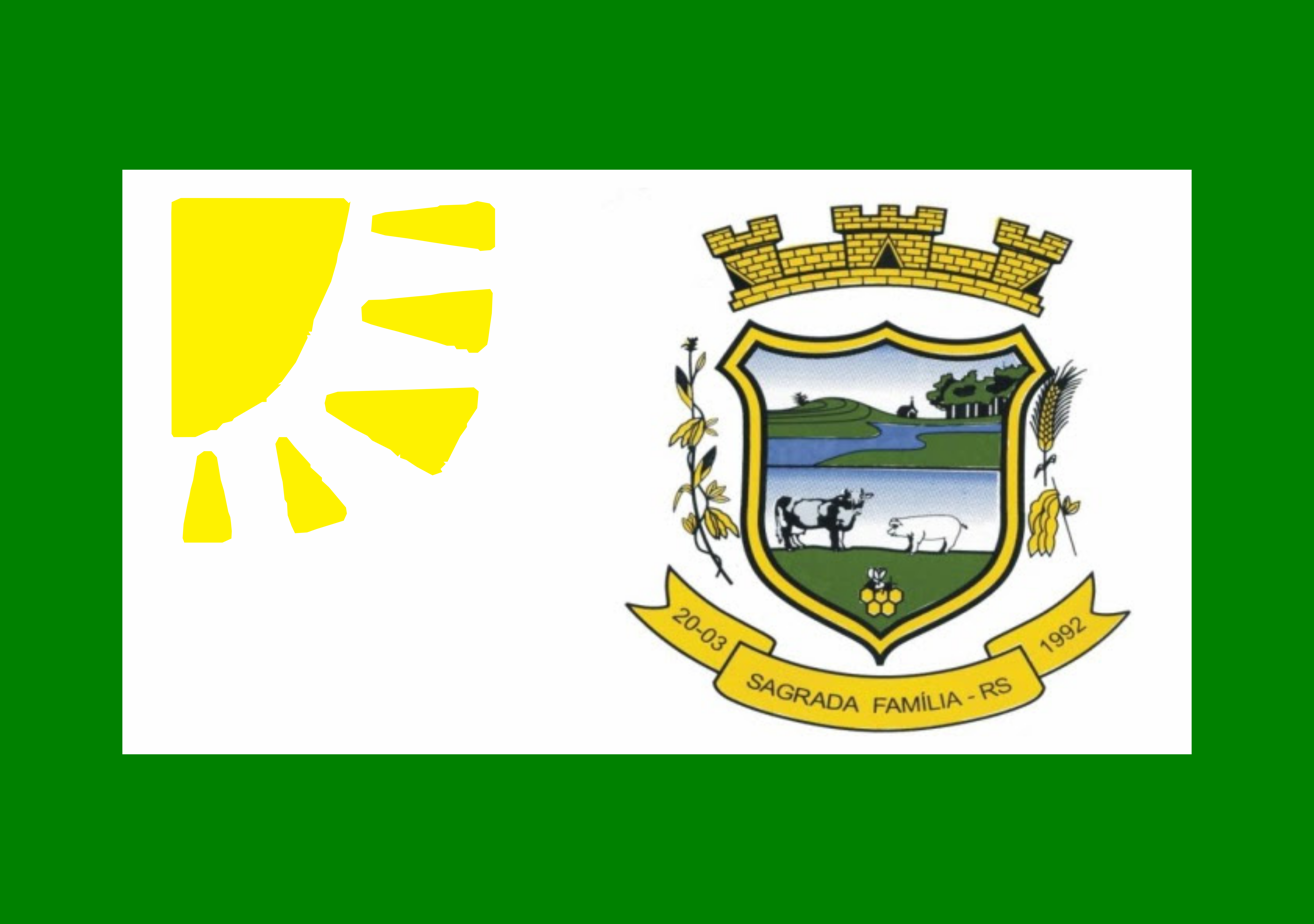
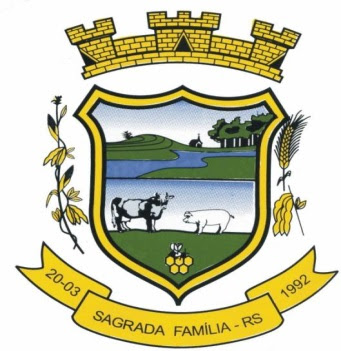
- Flag Coat of arms
- Interactive map of Sagrada Família, Rio Grande do Sul
- Country: Brazil
- Time zone: UTC−3 (BRT)

Sagrada Família is a municipality in the state of Rio Grande do Sul, Brazil. As of 2020, the estimated population was 2,605.

== See also ==
- List of municipalities in Rio Grande do Sul
