= Caseiros =

Municipality in Rio Grande do Sul, Brazil

Coordinates: 28°16′8″S 51°41′24″W

- Municipality
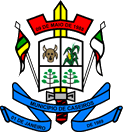
- Flag Coat of arms
- Interactive map of Caseiros
- Country: Brazil
- Time zone: UTC−3 (BRT)

Caseiros is a municipality in the state of Rio Grande do Sul, Brazil. As of 2020, the estimated population was 3,216.

== See also ==
- List of municipalities in Rio Grande do Sul
