= Novo Barreiro =

Municipality in Rio Grande do Sul, Brazil

Coordinates: 27°54′32″S 53°06′28″W

- Municipality
- Municipality of Novo Barreiro
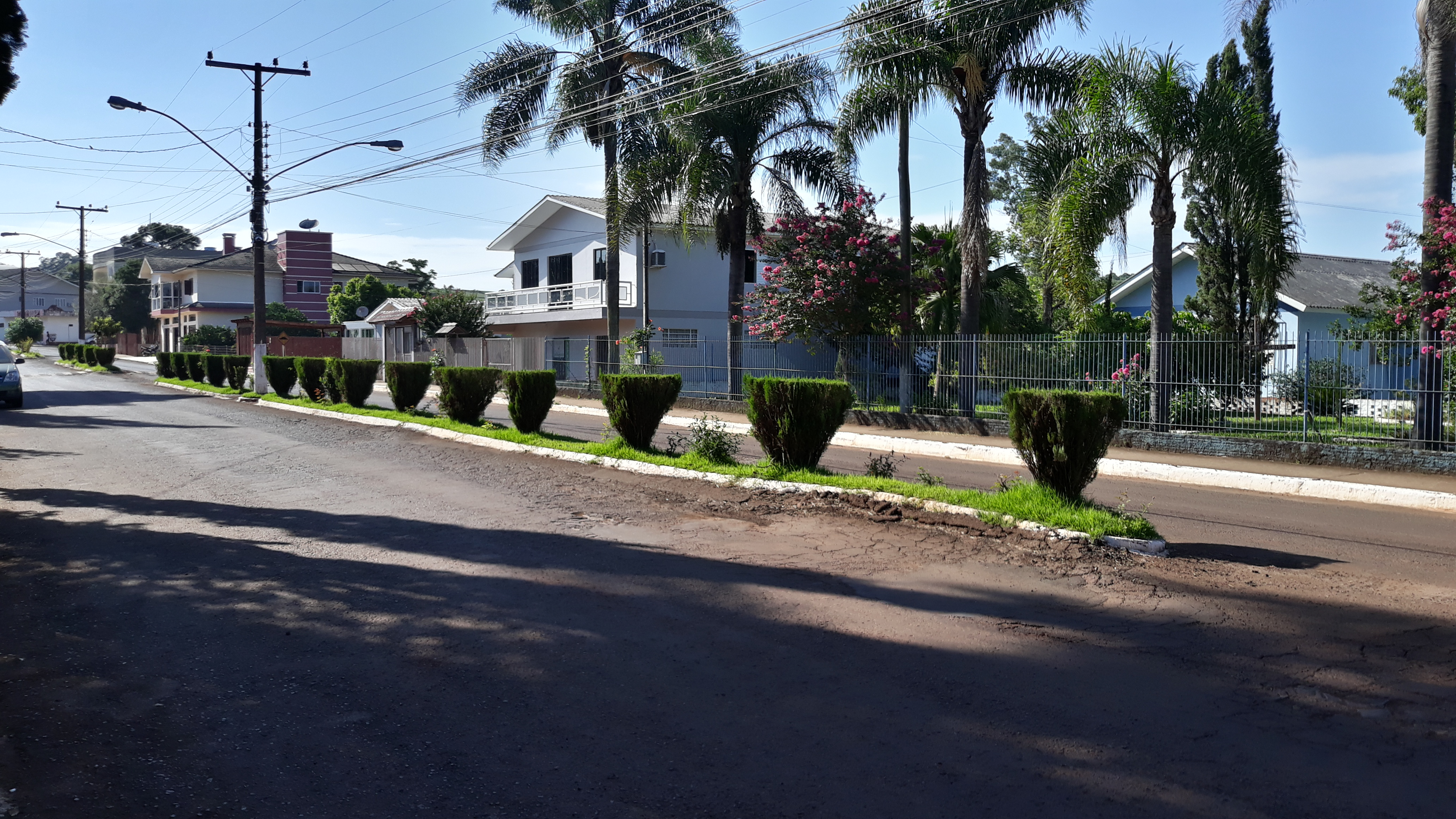
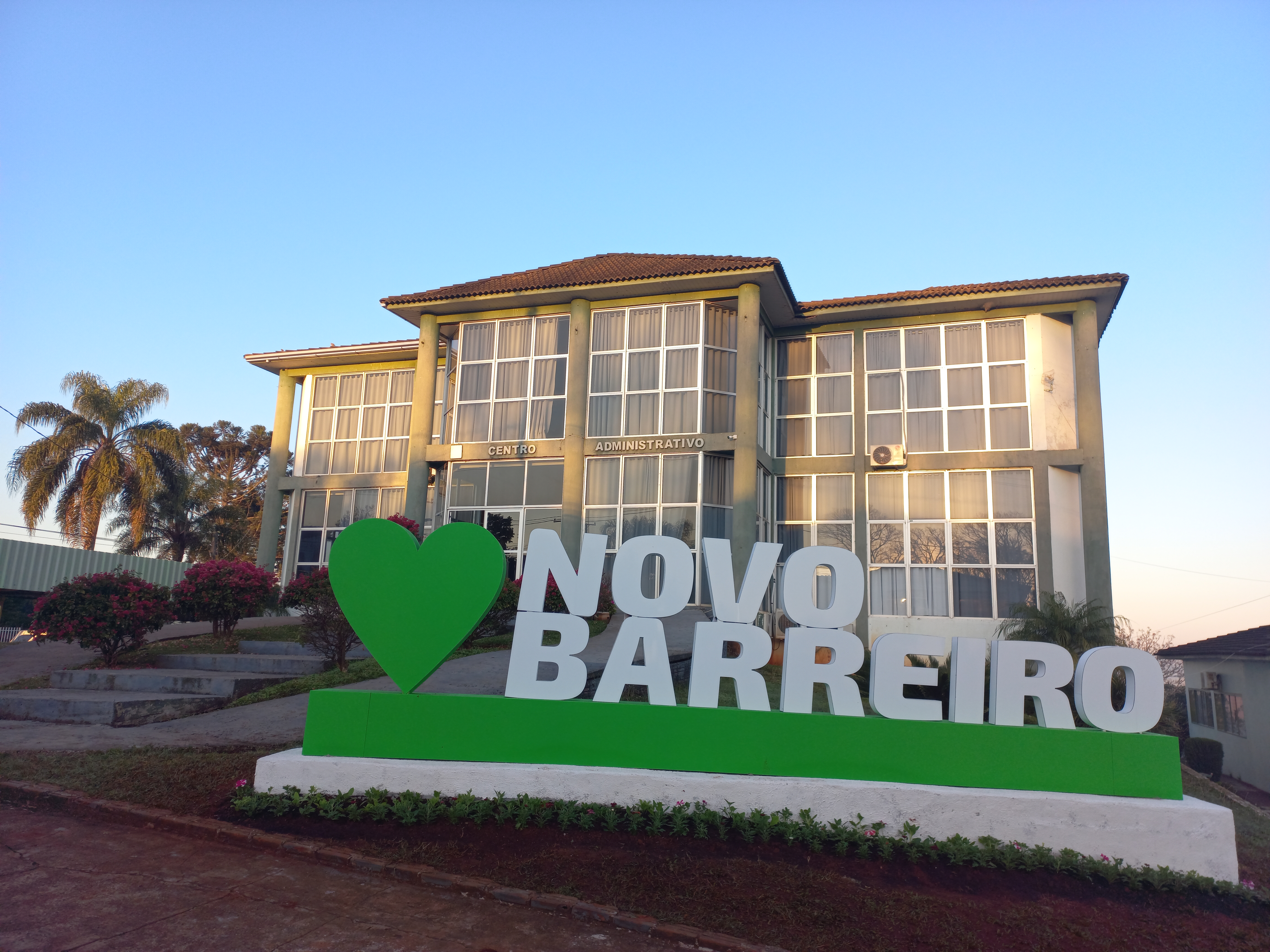

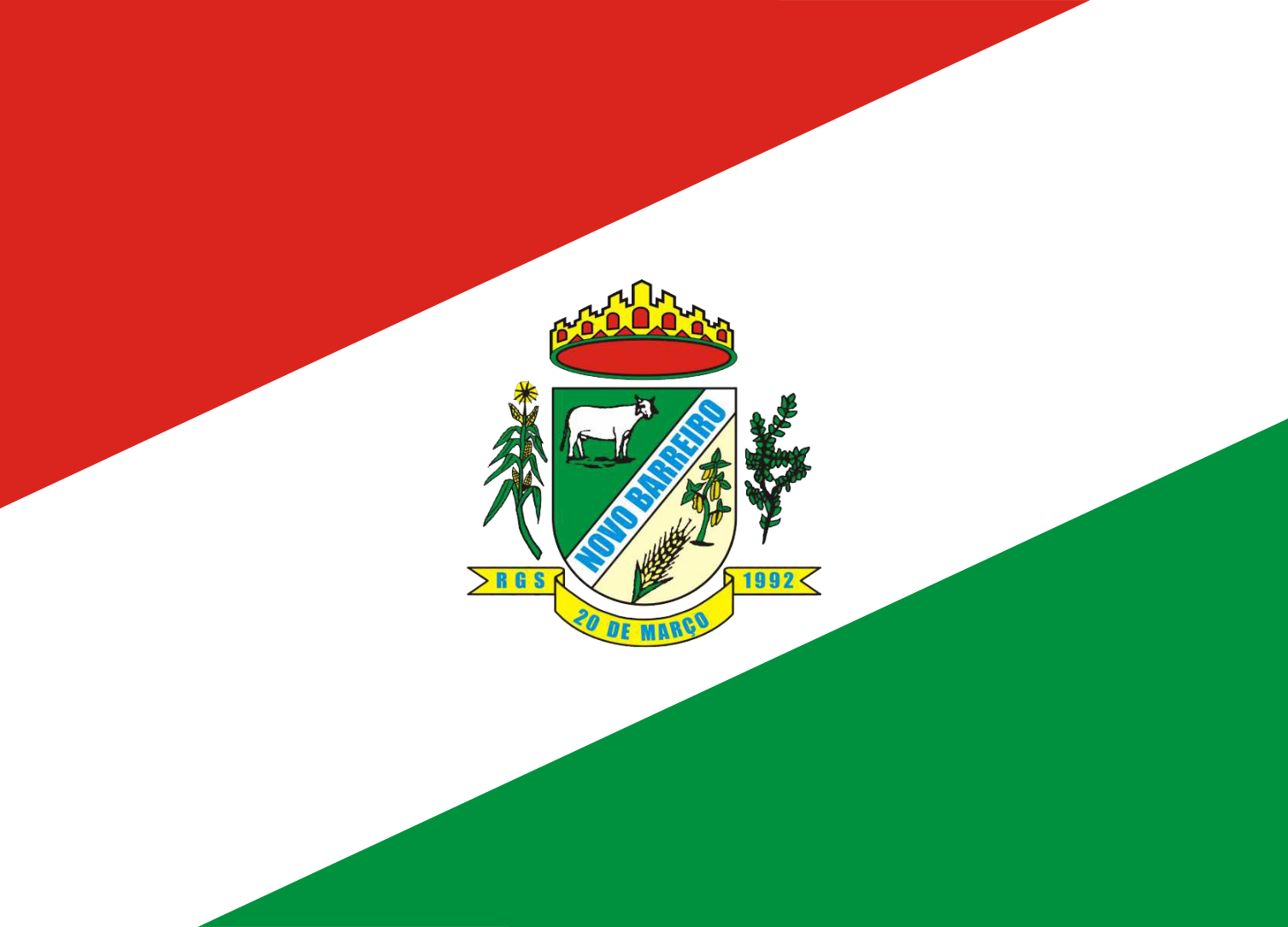
- Flag

- Location in Rio Grande do Sul

Government
  - Mayor: Marcia Rodrigues (Brazil Union)

Area
  - Total: 123,582 km^{2} (47,715 sq mi)

Population (2022)
  - Total: 4.272

Novo Barreiro is a municipality in the state of Rio Grande do Sul, Brazil. As of 2022, the population was 4,272.

== See also ==
- List of municipalities in Rio Grande do Sul
