= São José das Missões =

Municipality in Rio Grande do Sul, Brazil

Coordinates: 27°46′48″S 53°7′19″W

- Municipality
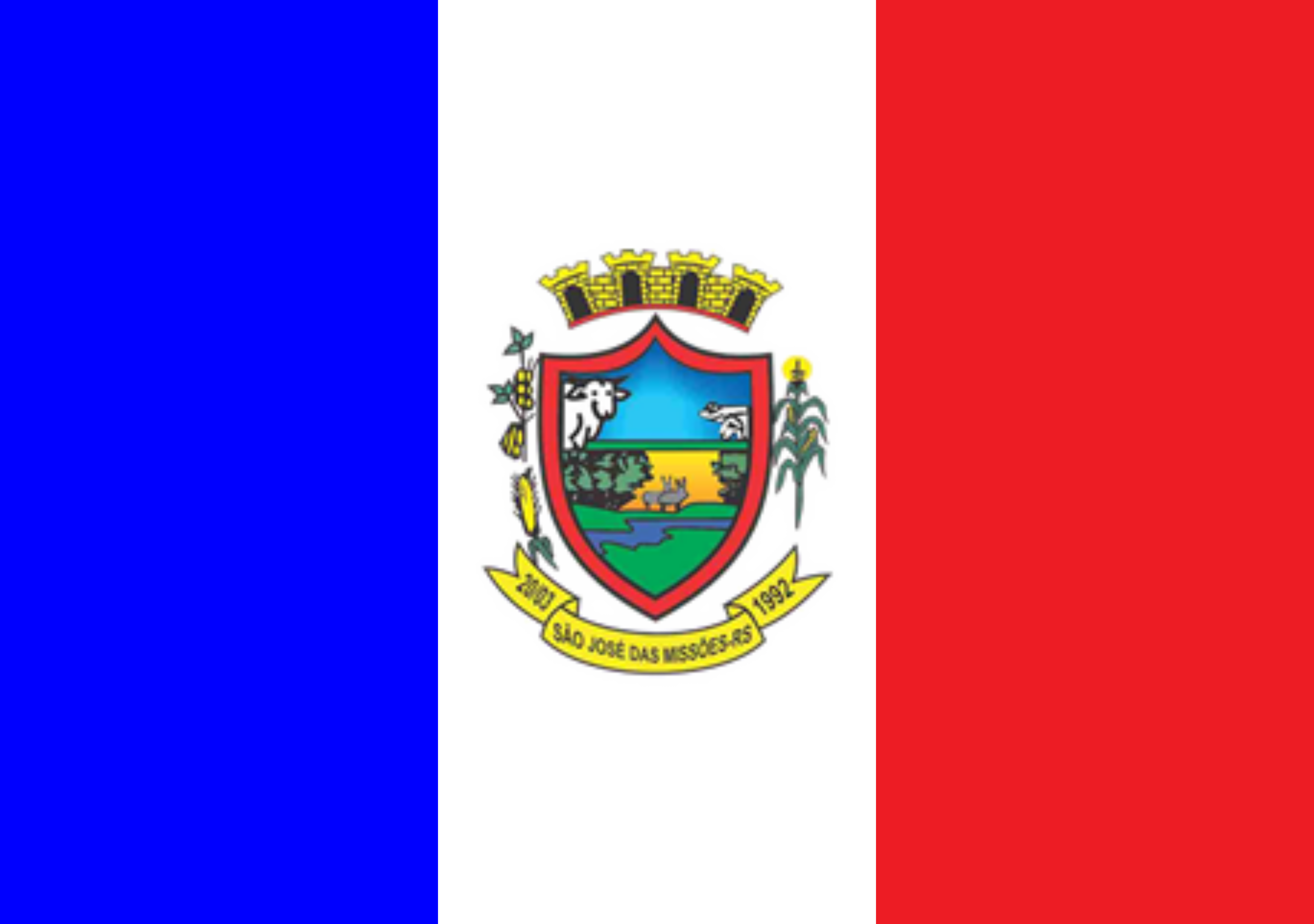
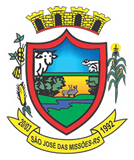
- Flag Coat of arms
- Interactive map of São José das Missões
- Country: Brazil
- Time zone: UTC−3 (BRT)

São José das Missões is a municipality in the state of Rio Grande do Sul, Brazil. As of 2020, the estimated population was 2,514.

== See also ==
- List of municipalities in Rio Grande do Sul
