= São José do Ouro =

Municipality in Rio Grande do Sul, Brazil

Coordinates: 27°46′08″S 51°35′38″W

- Municipality
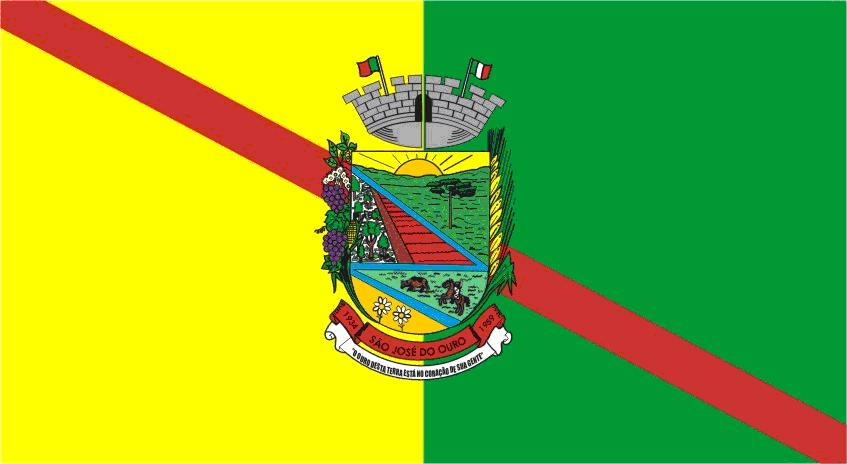
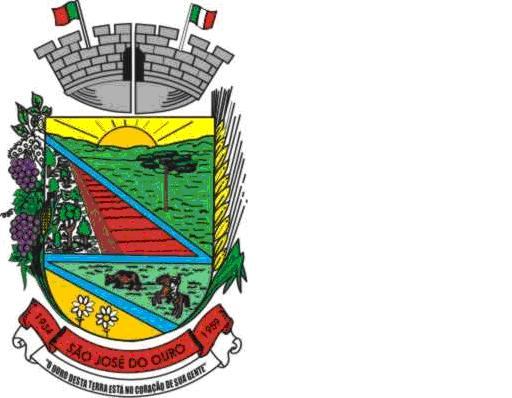
- Flag Coat of arms
- Interactive map of São José do Ouro
- Country: Brazil
- Time zone: UTC−3 (BRT)

São José do Ouro is a municipality in the state of Rio Grande do Sul, Brazil. As of 2020, the estimated population was 6,922.

== See also ==
- List of municipalities in Rio Grande do Sul
