= Gramado dos Loureiros =

Municipality in Rio Grande do Sul, Brazil

Coordinates: 27°26′38″S 52°55′04″W

- Municipality
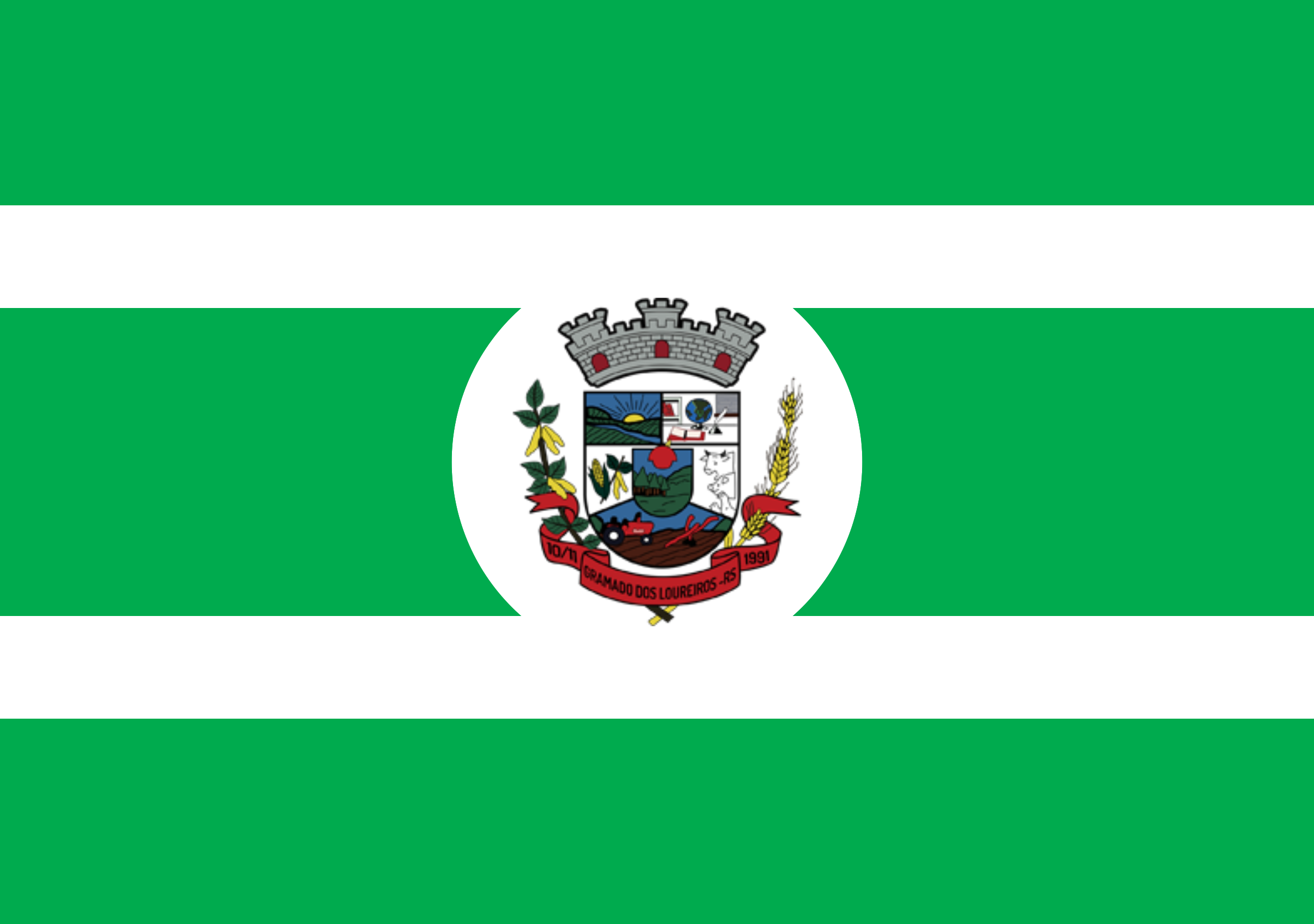
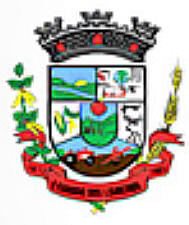
- Flag Coat of arms
- Interactive map of Gramado dos Loureiros
- Country: Brazil
- Time zone: UTC−3 (BRT)

Gramado dos Loureiros is a municipality in the state of Rio Grande do Sul, Brazil. As of 2020, the estimated population was 2,058.

== See also ==
- List of municipalities in Rio Grande do Sul
