= Vanini, Rio Grande do Sul =

Municipality in the state of Rio Grande do Sul, Brazil

Coordinates: 28°28′40″S 51°50′42″W

- Municipality
- Coat of arms
- Interactive map of Vanini, Rio Grande do Sul
- Country: Brazil
- Time zone: UTC−3 (BRT)

Vanini is a municipality in the state of Rio Grande do Sul, Brazil. As of 2020, the estimated population was 2,122.

== See also ==
- List of municipalities in Rio Grande do Sul
