= Alto Alegre, Rio Grande do Sul =

Municipality in Rio Grande do Sul, Brazil

Coordinates: 28°46′22″S 52°59′24″W

- Municipality
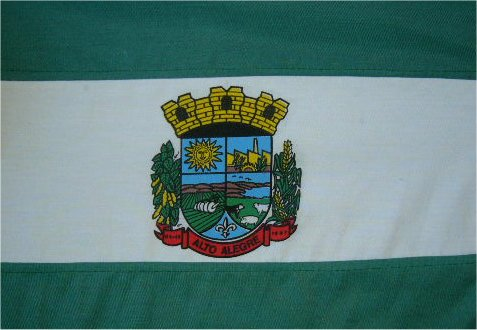
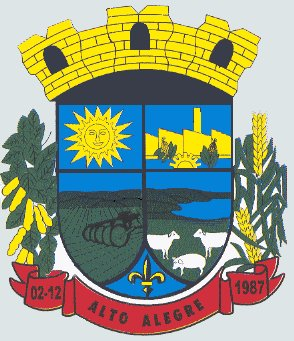
- Flag Coat of arms
- Interactive map of Alto Alegre, Rio Grande do Sul
- Country: Brazil
- Time zone: UTC−3 (BRT)

Alto Alegre (Portuguese: [ˈaw.tu aˈlɛ.ɡɾi]) is a municipality in the state of Rio Grande do Sul, Brazil. As of 2020, the estimated population was 1,613.

== See also ==
- List of municipalities in Rio Grande do Sul
