= Região da Uva e Vinho =

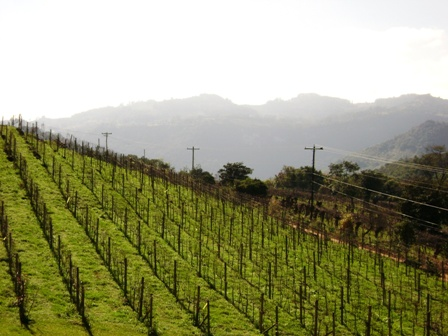
Vineyard landscape in winter 2007, in the Vale dos Vinhedos, near Bento Gonçalves

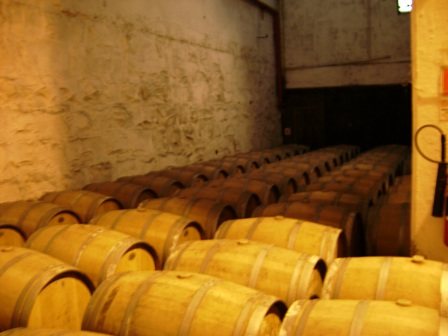
Barrels in a Bento Gonçalves winery

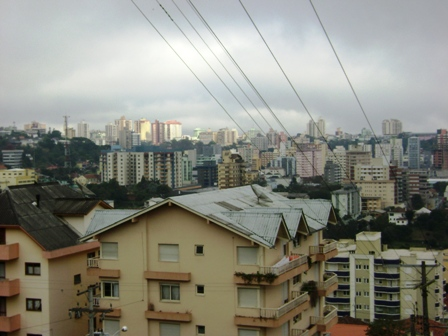
Partial view of Bento Gonçalves

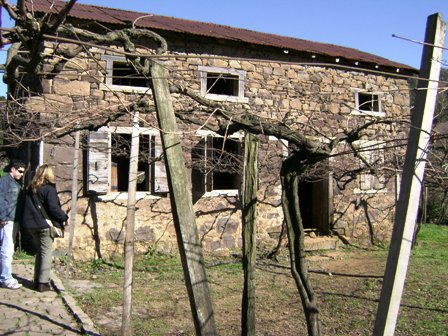
Stone House, part of the "Caminhos de Pedra" (Stone Paths) tourist route in the Pinto Bandeira district (Bento Gonçalves)

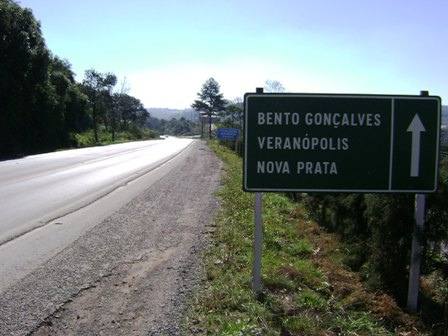
Sign on RST-470, near Bento Gonçalves

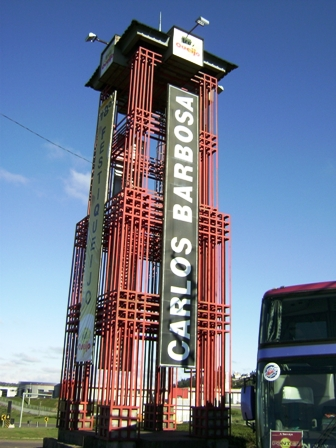
Gateway of Carlos Barbosa

The Região da Uva e Vinho (Wine and Grape Region) is a Brazilian tourist zone located in the northeast of the state of Rio Grande do Sul. It encompasses municipalities with the highest grape and wine production in the country. This condition has turned the region into one of the most important tourist hubs in Rio Grande do Sul, attracting hundreds of thousands of tourists from Rio Grande do Sul, other Brazilian states, and even other countries.

== Italian Colonization ==
The determinant factor for the current human occupation profile of the region was the colonization by Italian immigrants in the last decades of the 19th century. Through their colony system, producing grapes (introducing various fruit varieties previously unknown in Brazil) and wine (artisanally produced) on small properties, they grew throughout the 20th century. They adopted new winemaking methods and leveraged excellent tourism potential while preserving the traditions of their ancestors. These traditions include stone-built houses, homemade production of pasta, polenta, small roasted chickens (galeto), and bread; typical games like truco; moderate wine consumption (contributing to one of the highest life expectancies in Brazil for the inhabitants of Veranópolis); traditional music like the famous Mérica, Mérica!; and the Venetian dialect, among others.

== Relief ==
With land above 600 meters, the Wine and Grape Region is within the Basaltic Plateau and the Meridional Plateau. It features some valleys, such as the Rio das Antas, where the world's largest arched bridge, the Ponte Ernesto Dornelles, is located on the border between Bento Gonçalves and Veranópolis.

== Economy ==
With 83 wineries (both family-owned and large enterprises), where visitors can learn about the grape transformation process and wine and sparkling wine production, and taste the final results, the Wine and Grape Region has gained increasing national prominence in the economic and tourist sectors.

== Municipalities ==
- André da Rocha
- Antônio Prado
- Bento Gonçalves
- Carlos Barbosa
- Casca
- Caxias do Sul
- Coronel Pilar
- Cotiporã
- Fagundes Varela
- Farroupilha
- Flores da Cunha
- Garibaldi
- Guaporé
- Ipê
- Maraú
- Monte Belo do Sul
- Nova Araçá
- Nova Bassano
- Nova Pádua
- Nova Prata
- Nova Roma do Sul
- Pinto Bandeira
- Protásio Alves
- Santa Teresa
- Santo Antônio do Palma
- São Marcos
- São Valentim do Sul
- São Vendelino
- Serafina Corrêa
- União da Serra
- Veranópolis
- Vila Flores
- Vila Maria
- Vista Alegre do Prata
