= Sobradinho, Rio Grande do Sul =

Municipality of Rio Grande do Sul, Brazil

Sobradinho
- Municipality
- Flag Coat of arms

- Location within Rio Grande do Sul

- Location in Brazil
- Coordinates: 29°25′15″S 53°01′44″W
- Country: Brazil
- State: Rio Grande do Sul

Government
  - Mayor: Armando Mayerhofer

Population (2020)
  - Total: 15,005
- Time zone: UTC−3 (BRT)
- Postal code: 96900-000
- Area/distance code: +55 51
- Website: sobradinho.rs.gov.br

Sobradinho is a municipality in the state of Rio Grande do Sul, Brazil.

== History ==
The history of Sobradinho begins in 1825, with the arrival of Paulista João Lopes, who climbed the Serra Geral and settled on the banks of a stream, where he built a wooden two-story house (sobrado) on the road connecting Rio Pardo to Soledade. There, he established a trading post to serve travelers. The house also served as a reference point for the muleteers passing through.

On December 3, 1927, it became emancipated from the municipality of Soledade, of which it was part as the Fourth District. Initially named Jacuhy, it was later renamed Sobradinho.

== Geography ==
The municipality of Sobradinho is located in the Centro-Serra region. It borders the municipality of Arroio do Tigre to the north; Lagoa Bonita do Sul to the south; Passa Sete and Segredo to the east; and Ibarama to the west.

The altitude of the municipal seat is 427 meters; longitude −53.029 and latitude −29.421. It covers an area of 130 square kilometers, and its estimated population in 2008 was 14,675 inhabitants.

== Economy ==
The main industrial products manufactured in Sobradinho are upholstery, dairy products, leather clothing, fabric and knitwear, footwear, wood processing, wooden shoe lasts, wooden pegs for tobacco drying in kilns, metallurgy, meat, and wine.

The main agricultural products are tobacco (2,000 ha), beans (270 ha), corn (1,800 ha), soybeans (1,000 ha), and grapes (70 ha), while the primary livestock product is milk (1,440,000 liters per year).

== Tourism ==
The main tourist attractions in Sobradinho are the Bean Festival and House of Culture

== Education ==
The municipality has four state-run elementary schools, seven municipal elementary schools, one high school, and one college.

== Twin towns ==
Sobradinho is twinned with:

- Cornedo Vicentino, Veneto Region, since 2003

== See also ==
- List of municipalities in Rio Grande do Sul
