= Nova Prata =

Municipality of Rio Grande do Sul, Brazil

Nova Prata, Rio Grande do Sul
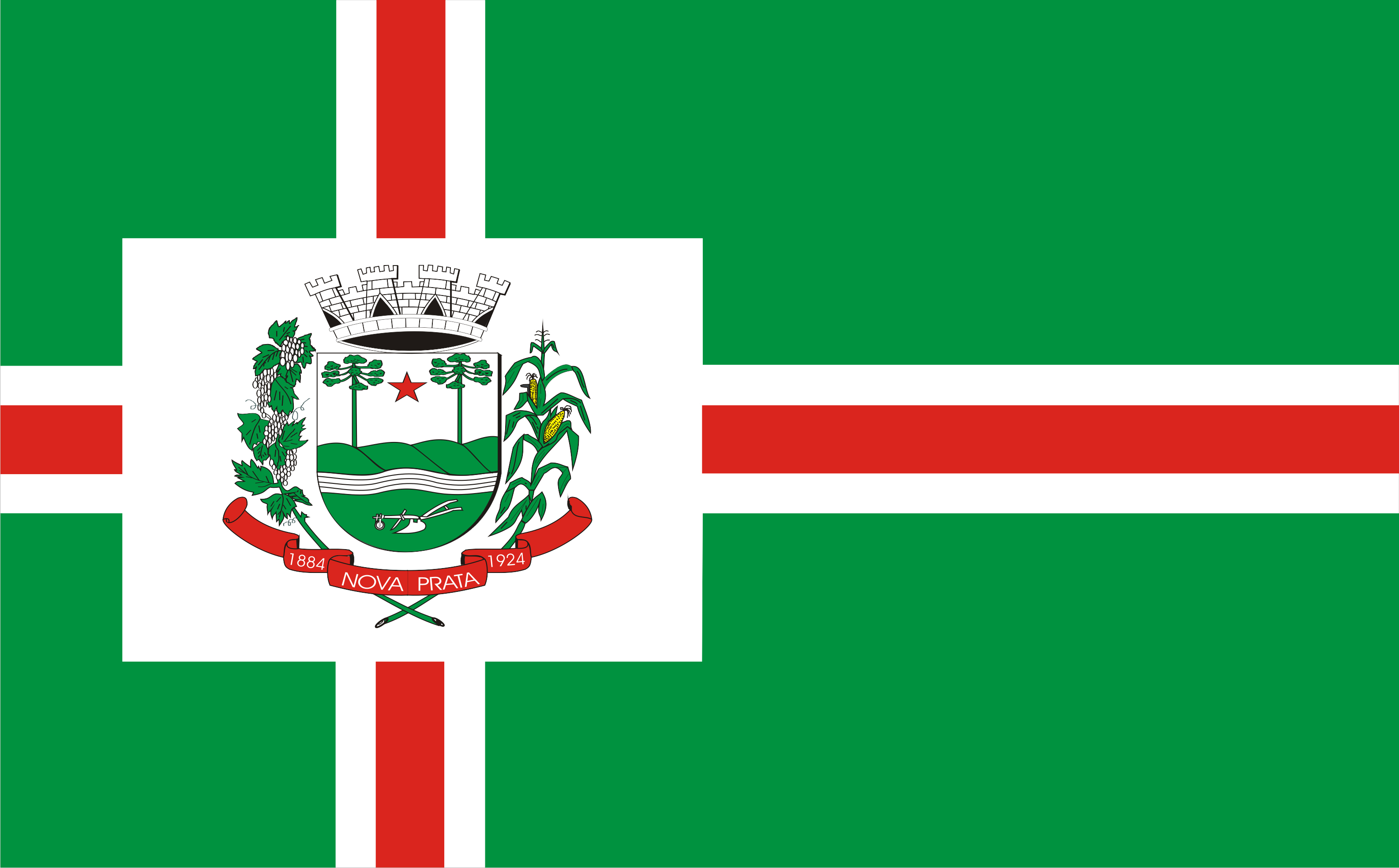
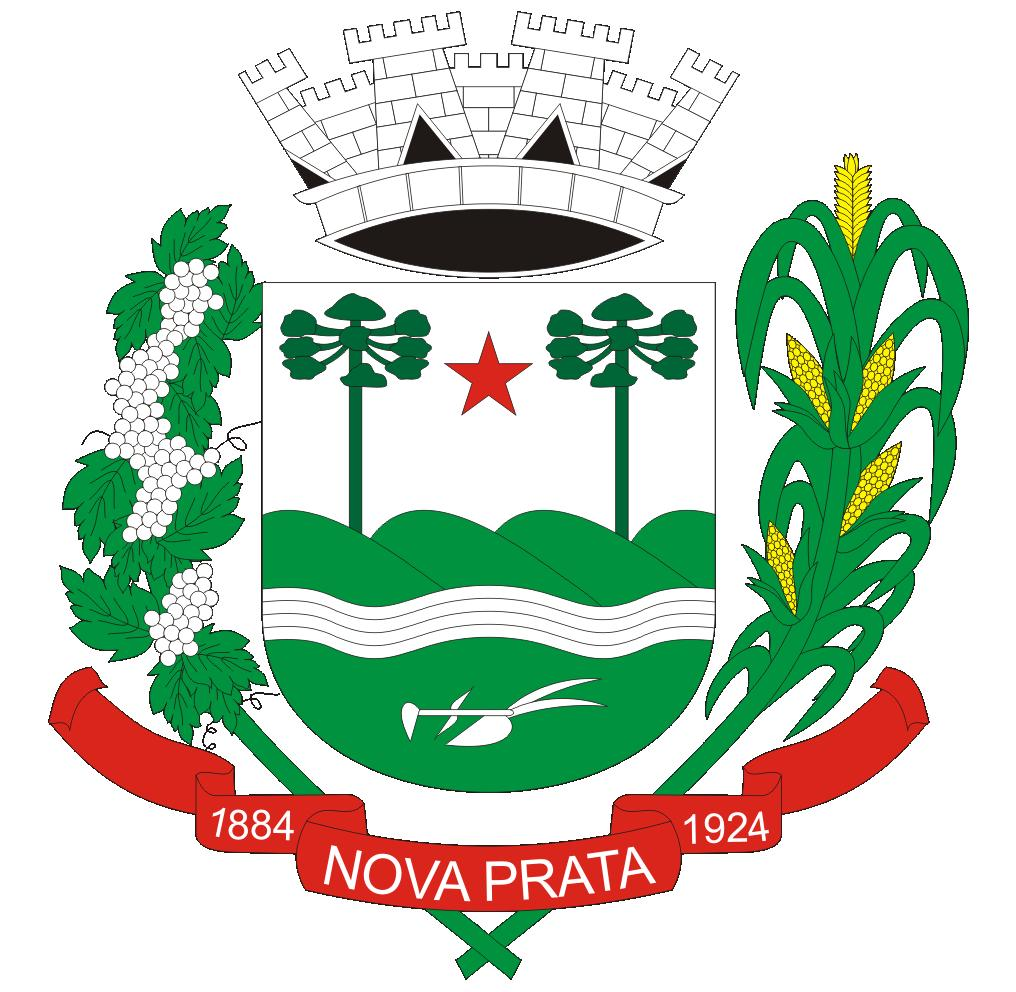
- Flag Coat of arms
- Nickname: Capital Nacional do Basalto
- Geographical subdivisions of Rio Grande do Sul. Nova Prata is marked red.
- Coordinates: 28°47′S 51°36′W
- Country: Brazil
- State: Rio Grande do Sul
- Meso-region: Nordeste Rio-Grandense
- Micro-region: Guapore

Government
  - Mayor: Volnei Minozzo

Area
  - Total: 258.864 km^{2} (99.948 sq mi)
- Elevation: 820 m (2,690 ft)

Population (2020)
  - Total: 27,648
  - Density: 987/km^{2} (2,560/sq mi)
- Demonym: Nova-Pratense
- Time zone: UTC−3 (BRT)
- Postal Code: 95320-000
- Area code: +55 54
- Website: www.novaprata.rs.gov.br

Nova Prata is a municipality in the mountainous Serra Gaúcha region of Rio Grande do Sul, in southern Brazil. It is in the Guapore micro-region of the Nordeste Rio-Grandense meso-region of the state.

== Geography ==
The city of Nova Prata is situated at about 28°47′0″S 51°36′40″W, at an altitude of 820 meters. The municipality occupies an area of 258.864 km^{2} or 259 km^{2}. In 2020 the population was estimated to be 27,648. Temperature ranges from a minimum of 14 °C to a maximum of 28 °C with an annual average of 20 °C.

Nova Prata is surrounded by the municipalities of: André da Rocha and Guabiju to the north; Fagundes Varela and Vila Flores to the south; Nova Bassano, Nova Araçá and Vista Alegre do Prata to the west; and Protásio Alves to the east.

== Twin towns ==
- Cittadella, Italy
- (United States) Noblesville, USA

== Illustrious Nova-Pratenses ==
- Elisa Volpatto – Actress
- Rosane Marchetti – Journalist

== See also ==
- List of municipalities in Rio Grande do Sul
