= Nova Bassano =

Municipality of Rio Grande do Sul, Brazil

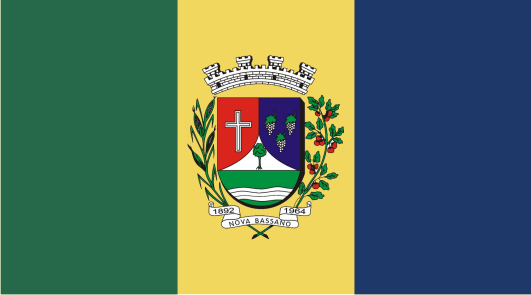
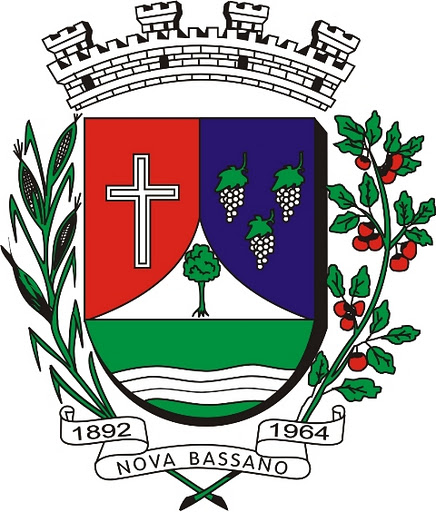
- Flag Coat of arms
- Interactive map of Nova Bassano
- Coordinates: 28°43′26″S 51°42′18″W
- Country: Brazil
- Region: South
- State: Rio Grande do Sul
- Mesorregião: Nordeste Rio-grandense
- Microregião: Guaporé
- Founded: 1895
- Emancipated: 23 Mai 1964

Government
  - Type: Prefecture
  - Mayor (Prefeito): Darcilo Luiz Pauletto (PMDB)

Area
  - Total: 211.612 km^{2} (81.704 sq mi)
- Elevation: 563 m (1,847 ft)

Population (2020)
  - Total: 10,005
  - Density: 43.7/km^{2} (113/sq mi)
- Time zone: UTC−3 (BRT)
- CEP (Post Code): 95 340-000
- Area code: ++55-32-...
- HDI (2000): 0.903 – high
- Website: http://www.novabassano.rs.gov.br/

Nova Bassano is a municipality and a city in the state of Rio Grande do Sul, south Brazil.

== History ==
Nova Bassano was established by Italian immigrants around 1890. Among them was Padre Pedro Antônio Colbachini, a Catholic priest member of the Scalabrini congregation, who is regarded together with his companions as the founder of the town. In those days, the town had been called Bassano in memory of the North Italian town of Bassano del Grappa (Province of Vicenza) from which the immigrant were coming. In 1939, during the Second World War, it was renamed Silva Pais, but in 1947, with the unanimous assent of the population, it was named Nova Bassano in tribute to the first immigrants.

Until 1898 the town was part of the municipality (Port.: município) of Lagoa Vermelha. Through successive administrative reforms it formed part of the municipalities of Veranópolis and Nova Prata. By virtue of State Law n° 4730 23 May 1964 Nova Bassano became a municipality of its own.

== Geography ==
Nova Bassano is situated in the state's mountainous Serra Gaúcha region. It is situated at 28°47′2″S 51°36′36″W, at an altitude of 563 meters above sea level. It occupies an area of 211.612 km^{2}.

The neighboring municipalities are on the north Nova Araçá, on the east Nova Prata, on the south Nova Prata and Vista Alegre do Prata, on the west Serafina Corrêa and Guaporé. The population was estimated by the Brazilian Institute of Geography and Statistics to amount to 10,005 in 2020.

=== Climate ===
Nova Bassano's climate is of the humid subtropical type (Cfa). The mean temperature is 18 °C and varies between 5 °C and 35 °C. Mean rainfalls amount to 1650 mm.

== Economy ==
The municipality enjoys one of the highest Human Development Index (IDH) of the state and of Brazil, i.e. 0.844, placing it on the 39th rank of the 3.527 municipalities of the country. Nova Bassano's economy is strong and is characterized by its diversification, extending to agriculture, wine production, industry, food industry and commerce. The metal industry is particularly present in the municipality because several companies have established there.

== Education and culture ==
Nova Bassano's school capacity exceeds 1.200 students, the Colbachini College (Port.: Colégio Padre Colbachini) being the major educative institution of the municipality. Furthermore, there are computer schools, a Municipal Library and a Cultural Society.

== Tourism and attractions ==
The locality's interest is enhanced by the vicinity of the Serra Gaúcha mountain. Nova Bassano hosts many plants native of the region, including 100 species of recognized native trees. The main tourist sights of the municipality are:

- the public municipal museum (MPMNB) exhibiting historic artifacts in particular relating to the Italian early settlement.
- the huge Church Chiesa Matriz Sagrado Coração de Jesus, where the first mass of the region was celebrated at Christmas 1895, with a side Bell tower of 30 meters supporting a clock watch built in 1938.
- the Rodeios park.
- the chapel and cross of the mount Paréu (monte Caravágio), the highest peak of the region.
- the Grotta Nossa Senhora de Lourdes
- the square Padre Cobachini
- the wine route (port.: Rota uva e vinho) in the Serra Gaúcha mountain
- the Zanetti quarter with the "balnéario" of the Rio Carreiro.

== Religion ==
Most of the Bassanense belong to the Roman Catholic Church. The Patron Saint of the city is the Sacred Heart of Jesus.

== Events and festivals ==
- 23 May: anniversary of the constitution (Port.: Emancipação) of the municipality
- 8 December: Immaculate Conception
- June: Corpus Christi

== Transports and communications ==
Nova Bassano is linked through highways RS 324 e BR/RS 470. Nearby airports include Caxias do Sul (Campo dos Bugres) at 73 km and the Passo Fundo airport at 81 km.

== Government ==
The first elections took place on 10 January 1965. Since then, the population of Nova Bassano has elected the following mayors:

Mandato	Prefeito	Partido
1965–1968	Felisberto Antônio Dalla Costa	PMDB
1969–1972	Innocente Ângelo Biotto	PDS
1973–1976	Enio Luiz Boscato	PMDB
1977–1982	Tranquillo Zanetti	PDS
1983–1988	Felisberto Antônio Dalla Costa	PMDB
1993–1996	Agenor José Luis Cestonaro	PDT
2000–2004	Nelso Antônio Dall'Agnol	PMDB
2005–2008	Nelson José Dall'Igna	PP
2009–2012	Darcilo Luiz Pauletto	PMDB
2013-

== Notable persons ==
- Don Laurindo Guizzardi: Catholic bishop, author of the book Nova Bassano: das origens ao raiar do século XX;
- Padre Pedro Antônio Colbachini: he was the first priest to migrate to Nova Bassano from Bassano del Grappa. Padre Colbachini (or Colbacchini) was a member of the Scalabrini congregation.

== See also ==
- List of municipalities in Rio Grande do Sul

== Further reading (in Portuguese) ==
- Dom Laurindo Guizzardi. Nova Bassano: das origens ao raiar do século XX. Caxias do Sul (RS): Universidade de Caxias do Sul (UCS), 1992, 125 pp. In the Biblioteca fatea
- Firléia Guadagnin Radin. Centenário da primeira missa em Nova Bassano: 25.12.1896 a 25.12.1996. Passo Fundo: Pe. Berthier dos Missionários da Sagrada Família, 1995, 78 pp. In the Brazilian National Library
- Samira Dall'Agnol. A leitura e seu valor social. Um estudo sobre práticas de leitura e condições socioeconómicas e culturais. Caxias do Sul (RS): University of Caxias do Sul (UCS), 2007, 139 pp. (Chapter 1.1, pp. 18–23 Nova Bassano: um município em pesquisa). pdf
- Vanderlan Alves de Souza. Histórico do Município de Nova Bassano. pdf
- Vitalina M. Frosi, Giselle O. dal Corno, Carmen M. Faggion. Topônimos na RCI: Resgate da identidade cultural. Caxias do Sul (RS): University of Caxias do Sul (UCS). pdf
