= São José do Inhacorá =

Municipality of Rio Grande do Sul, Brazil

- Municipality
- Municipality of São José do Inhacorá
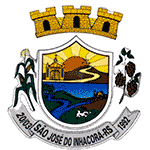
- Coat of arms

- Location in Rio Grande do Sul

- Location in Brazil
- Coordinates: 27°43′30″S 54°07′44″W
- Country: Brazil
- Region: South
- State: Rio Grande do Sul
- Emancipated: 20 March 1992

Government
  - Mayor: Gilberto Pedro Hammes

Area
  - Total: 77.806 km^{2} (30.041 sq mi)
- Elevation: 220 m (720 ft)

Population (2020)
  - Total: 2,056
- Time zone: UTC−3 (BRT)
- Postal Code: 98958-000
- Area code: +55 55
- Website: saojosedoinhacora.rs.gov.br

São José do Inhacorá is a municipality in the state of Rio Grande do Sul, Brazil. Originally, this little city was a district of Três de Maio and obtained its emancipation in 1992.

The city is considered the less dangerous in Brazil to live, and it shares this status with Borá. Violence is virtually eradicated (0 deaths per 100 thousand inhabitants).

== See also ==
- List of municipalities in Rio Grande do Sul
