= André Rocha =

André Rocha may refer to:

- André Rocha (athlete), Brazilian Paralympic athlete
- André Rocha (footballer), Brazilian soccer player who currently plays for Figueirense
- André da Rocha, a municipality in the state Rio Grande do Sul, Brazil
