= List of municipalities in Rio Grande do Sul =

This is a list of the municipalities in the state of Rio Grande do Sul (RS), located in the South Region of Brazil. Rio Grande do Sul is divided into 497 municipalities, which are grouped into 35 microregions, which are grouped into 7 mesoregions.

Municipalities of Rio Grande do Sul, Brazil

Mesoregion	Microregion	Municipality
Centro Ocidental Rio-Grandense	Restinga Seca	Agudo
Centro Ocidental Rio-Grandense	Restinga Seca	Dona Francisca
Centro Ocidental Rio-Grandense	Restinga Seca	Faxinal do Soturno
Centro Ocidental Rio-Grandense	Restinga Seca	Formigueiro
Centro Ocidental Rio-Grandense	Restinga Seca	Ivorá
Centro Ocidental Rio-Grandense	Restinga Seca	Nova Palma
Centro Ocidental Rio-Grandense	Restinga Seca	Restinga Seca
Centro Ocidental Rio-Grandense	Restinga Seca	São João do Polêsine
Centro Ocidental Rio-Grandense	Restinga Seca	Silveira Martins
Centro Ocidental Rio-Grandense	Santa Maria	Cacequi
Centro Ocidental Rio-Grandense	Santa Maria	Dilermando de Aguiar
Centro Ocidental Rio-Grandense	Santa Maria	Itaara
Centro Ocidental Rio-Grandense	Santa Maria	Jaguari
Centro Ocidental Rio-Grandense	Santa Maria	Mata
Centro Ocidental Rio-Grandense	Santa Maria	Nova Esperança do Sul
Centro Ocidental Rio-Grandense	Santa Maria	Santa Maria
Centro Ocidental Rio-Grandense	Santa Maria	São Martinho da Serra
Centro Ocidental Rio-Grandense	Santa Maria	São Pedro do Sul
Centro Ocidental Rio-Grandense	Santa Maria	São Sepé
Centro Ocidental Rio-Grandense	Santa Maria	São Vicente do Sul
Centro Ocidental Rio-Grandense	Santa Maria	Toropi
Centro Ocidental Rio-Grandense	Santa Maria	Vila Nova do Sul
Centro Ocidental Rio-Grandense	Santiago	Capão do Cipó
Centro Ocidental Rio-Grandense	Santiago	Itacurubi
Centro Ocidental Rio-Grandense	Santiago	Jari
Centro Ocidental Rio-Grandense	Santiago	Júlio de Castilhos
Centro Ocidental Rio-Grandense	Santiago	Pinhal Grande
Centro Ocidental Rio-Grandense	Santiago	Quevedos
Centro Ocidental Rio-Grandense	Santiago	Santiago
Centro Ocidental Rio-Grandense	Santiago	Tupanciretã
Centro Ocidental Rio-Grandense	Santiago	Unistalda
Centro Oriental Rio-Grandense	Cachoeira do Sul	Cachoeira do Sul
Centro Oriental Rio-Grandense	Cachoeira do Sul	Cerro Branco
Centro Oriental Rio-Grandense	Cachoeira do Sul	Novo Cabrais
Centro Oriental Rio-Grandense	Cachoeira do Sul	Pantano Grande
Centro Oriental Rio-Grandense	Cachoeira do Sul	Paraíso do Sul
Centro Oriental Rio-Grandense	Cachoeira do Sul	Passo do Sobrado
Centro Oriental Rio-Grandense	Cachoeira do Sul	Rio Pardo
Centro Oriental Rio-Grandense	Lajeado-Estrela	Arroio do Meio
Centro Oriental Rio-Grandense	Lajeado-Estrela	Bom Retiro do Sul
Centro Oriental Rio-Grandense	Lajeado-Estrela	Boqueirão do Leão
Centro Oriental Rio-Grandense	Lajeado-Estrela	Canudos do Vale
Centro Oriental Rio-Grandense	Lajeado-Estrela	Capitão
Centro Oriental Rio-Grandense	Lajeado-Estrela	Colinas
Centro Oriental Rio-Grandense	Lajeado-Estrela	Coqueiro Baixo
Centro Oriental Rio-Grandense	Lajeado-Estrela	Cruzeiro do Sul
Centro Oriental Rio-Grandense	Lajeado-Estrela	Doutor Ricardo
Centro Oriental Rio-Grandense	Lajeado-Estrela	Encantado
Centro Oriental Rio-Grandense	Lajeado-Estrela	Estrela
Centro Oriental Rio-Grandense	Lajeado-Estrela	Fazenda Vilanova
Centro Oriental Rio-Grandense	Lajeado-Estrela	Forquetinha
Centro Oriental Rio-Grandense	Lajeado-Estrela	Imigrante
Centro Oriental Rio-Grandense	Lajeado-Estrela	Lajeado
Centro Oriental Rio-Grandense	Lajeado-Estrela	Marques de Souza
Centro Oriental Rio-Grandense	Lajeado-Estrela	Muçum
Centro Oriental Rio-Grandense	Lajeado-Estrela	Nova Bréscia
Centro Oriental Rio-Grandense	Lajeado-Estrela	Paverama
Centro Oriental Rio-Grandense	Lajeado-Estrela	Pouso Novo
Centro Oriental Rio-Grandense	Lajeado-Estrela	Progresso
Centro Oriental Rio-Grandense	Lajeado-Estrela	Relvado
Centro Oriental Rio-Grandense	Lajeado-Estrela	Roca Sales
Centro Oriental Rio-Grandense	Lajeado-Estrela	Santa Clara do Sul
Centro Oriental Rio-Grandense	Lajeado-Estrela	Sério
Centro Oriental Rio-Grandense	Lajeado-Estrela	Tabaí
Centro Oriental Rio-Grandense	Lajeado-Estrela	Taquari
Centro Oriental Rio-Grandense	Lajeado-Estrela	Teutônia
Centro Oriental Rio-Grandense	Lajeado-Estrela	Travesseiro
Centro Oriental Rio-Grandense	Lajeado-Estrela	Vespasiano Correa
Centro Oriental Rio-Grandense	Lajeado-Estrela	Westfália
Centro Oriental Rio-Grandense	Santa Cruz do Sul	Arroio do Tigre
Centro Oriental Rio-Grandense	Santa Cruz do Sul	Candelária
Centro Oriental Rio-Grandense	Santa Cruz do Sul	Estrela Velha
Centro Oriental Rio-Grandense	Santa Cruz do Sul	Gramado Xavier
Centro Oriental Rio-Grandense	Santa Cruz do Sul	Herveiras
Centro Oriental Rio-Grandense	Santa Cruz do Sul	Ibarama
Centro Oriental Rio-Grandense	Santa Cruz do Sul	Lagoa Bonita do Sul
Centro Oriental Rio-Grandense	Santa Cruz do Sul	Mato Leitão
Centro Oriental Rio-Grandense	Santa Cruz do Sul	Passa Sete
Centro Oriental Rio-Grandense	Santa Cruz do Sul	Santa Cruz do Sul
Centro Oriental Rio-Grandense	Santa Cruz do Sul	Segredo
Centro Oriental Rio-Grandense	Santa Cruz do Sul	Sinimbu
Centro Oriental Rio-Grandense	Santa Cruz do Sul	Sobradinho
Centro Oriental Rio-Grandense	Santa Cruz do Sul	Vale do Sol
Centro Oriental Rio-Grandense	Santa Cruz do Sul	Venâncio Aires
Centro Oriental Rio-Grandense	Santa Cruz do Sul	Vera Cruz
Greater Porto Alegre	Camaquã	Arambaré
Greater Porto Alegre	Camaquã	Barra do Ribeiro
Greater Porto Alegre	Camaquã	Camaquã
Greater Porto Alegre	Camaquã	Cerro Grande do Sul
Greater Porto Alegre	Camaquã	Chuvisca
Greater Porto Alegre	Camaquã	Dom Feliciano
Greater Porto Alegre	Camaquã	Sentinela do Sul
Greater Porto Alegre	Camaquã	Tapes
Greater Porto Alegre	Gramado-Canela	Canela
Greater Porto Alegre	Gramado-Canela	Dois Irmãos
Greater Porto Alegre	Gramado-Canela	Gramado
Greater Porto Alegre	Gramado-Canela	Igrejinha
Greater Porto Alegre	Gramado-Canela	Ivoti
Greater Porto Alegre	Gramado-Canela	Lindolfo Collor
Greater Porto Alegre	Gramado-Canela	Morro Reuter
Greater Porto Alegre	Gramado-Canela	Nova Petrópolis
Greater Porto Alegre	Gramado-Canela	Picada Café
Greater Porto Alegre	Gramado-Canela	Presidente Lucena
Greater Porto Alegre	Gramado-Canela	Riozinho
Greater Porto Alegre	Gramado-Canela	Rolante
Greater Porto Alegre	Gramado-Canela	Santa Maria do Herval
Greater Porto Alegre	Gramado-Canela	Taquara
Greater Porto Alegre	Gramado-Canela	Três Coroas
Greater Porto Alegre	Montenegro	Alto Feliz
Greater Porto Alegre	Montenegro	Barão
Greater Porto Alegre	Montenegro	Bom Princípio
Greater Porto Alegre	Montenegro	Brochier
Greater Porto Alegre	Montenegro	Capela de Santana
Greater Porto Alegre	Montenegro	Feliz
Greater Porto Alegre	Montenegro	Harmonia
Greater Porto Alegre	Montenegro	Linha Nova
Greater Porto Alegre	Montenegro	Maratá
Greater Porto Alegre	Montenegro	Montenegro
Greater Porto Alegre	Montenegro	Pareci Novo
Greater Porto Alegre	Montenegro	Poço das Antas
Greater Porto Alegre	Montenegro	Portão
Greater Porto Alegre	Montenegro	Salvador do Sul
Greater Porto Alegre	Montenegro	São José do Hortêncio
Greater Porto Alegre	Montenegro	São José do Sul
Greater Porto Alegre	Montenegro	São Pedro da Serra
Greater Porto Alegre	Montenegro	São Sebastião do Caí
Greater Porto Alegre	Montenegro	São Vendelino
Greater Porto Alegre	Montenegro	Tupandi
Greater Porto Alegre	Montenegro	Vale Real
Greater Porto Alegre	Osório	Arroio do Sal
Greater Porto Alegre	Osório	Balneário Pinhal
Greater Porto Alegre	Osório	Capão da Canoa
Greater Porto Alegre	Osório	Capivari do Sul
Greater Porto Alegre	Osório	Caraá
Greater Porto Alegre	Osório	Cidreira
Greater Porto Alegre	Osório	Dom Pedro de Alcântara
Greater Porto Alegre	Osório	Imbé
Greater Porto Alegre	Osório	Itati
Greater Porto Alegre	Osório	Mampituba
Greater Porto Alegre	Osório	Maquiné
Greater Porto Alegre	Osório	Morrinhos do Sul
Greater Porto Alegre	Osório	Mostardas
Greater Porto Alegre	Osório	Osório
Greater Porto Alegre	Osório	Palmares do Sul
Greater Porto Alegre	Osório	Santo Antônio da Patrulha
Greater Porto Alegre	Osório	Tavares
Greater Porto Alegre	Osório	Terra de Areia
Greater Porto Alegre	Osório	Torres
Greater Porto Alegre	Osório	Tramandaí
Greater Porto Alegre	Osório	Três Cachoeiras
Greater Porto Alegre	Osório	Três Forquilhas
Greater Porto Alegre	Osório	Xangri-lá
Greater Porto Alegre	Porto Alegre	Alvorada
Greater Porto Alegre	Porto Alegre	Araricá
Greater Porto Alegre	Porto Alegre	Cachoeirinha
Greater Porto Alegre	Porto Alegre	Campo Bom
Greater Porto Alegre	Porto Alegre	Canoas
Greater Porto Alegre	Porto Alegre	Eldorado do Sul
Greater Porto Alegre	Porto Alegre	Estância Velha
Greater Porto Alegre	Porto Alegre	Esteio
Greater Porto Alegre	Porto Alegre	Glorinha
Greater Porto Alegre	Porto Alegre	Gravataí
Greater Porto Alegre	Porto Alegre	Guaíba
Greater Porto Alegre	Porto Alegre	Mariana Pimentel
Greater Porto Alegre	Porto Alegre	Nova Hartz
Greater Porto Alegre	Porto Alegre	Nova Santa Rita
Greater Porto Alegre	Porto Alegre	Novo Hamburgo
Greater Porto Alegre	Porto Alegre	Parobé
Greater Porto Alegre	Porto Alegre	Porto Alegre (State Capital)
Greater Porto Alegre	Porto Alegre	São Leopoldo
Greater Porto Alegre	Porto Alegre	Sapiranga
Greater Porto Alegre	Porto Alegre	Sapucaia do Sul
Greater Porto Alegre	Porto Alegre	Sertão Santana
Greater Porto Alegre	Porto Alegre	Viamão
Greater Porto Alegre	São Jerônimo	Arroio dos Ratos
Greater Porto Alegre	São Jerônimo	Barão do Triunfo
Greater Porto Alegre	São Jerônimo	Butiá
Greater Porto Alegre	São Jerônimo	Charqueadas
Greater Porto Alegre	São Jerônimo	General Câmara
Greater Porto Alegre	São Jerônimo	Minas do Leão
Greater Porto Alegre	São Jerônimo	São Jerônimo
Greater Porto Alegre	São Jerônimo	Triunfo
Greater Porto Alegre	São Jerônimo	Vale Verde
Nordeste Rio-Grandense	Caxias do Sul	Antônio Prado
Nordeste Rio-Grandense	Caxias do Sul	Bento Gonçalves
Nordeste Rio-Grandense	Caxias do Sul	Boa Vista do Sul
Nordeste Rio-Grandense	Caxias do Sul	Carlos Barbosa
Nordeste Rio-Grandense	Caxias do Sul	Caxias do Sul
Nordeste Rio-Grandense	Caxias do Sul	Coronel Pilar
Nordeste Rio-Grandense	Caxias do Sul	Cotiporã
Nordeste Rio-Grandense	Caxias do Sul	Fagundes Varela
Nordeste Rio-Grandense	Caxias do Sul	Farroupilha
Nordeste Rio-Grandense	Caxias do Sul	Flores da Cunha
Nordeste Rio-Grandense	Caxias do Sul	Garibaldi
Nordeste Rio-Grandense	Caxias do Sul	Monte Belo do Sul
Nordeste Rio-Grandense	Caxias do Sul	Nova Pádua
Nordeste Rio-Grandense	Caxias do Sul	Nova Roma do Sul
Nordeste Rio-Grandense	Caxias do Sul	Pinto Bandeira
Nordeste Rio-Grandense	Caxias do Sul	Santa Tereza
Nordeste Rio-Grandense	Caxias do Sul	São Marcos
Nordeste Rio-Grandense	Caxias do Sul	Veranópolis
Nordeste Rio-Grandense	Caxias do Sul	Vila Flores
Nordeste Rio-Grandense	Guaporé	André da Rocha
Nordeste Rio-Grandense	Guaporé	Anta Gorda
Nordeste Rio-Grandense	Guaporé	Arvorezinha
Nordeste Rio-Grandense	Guaporé	Dois Lajeados
Nordeste Rio-Grandense	Guaporé	Guabiju
Nordeste Rio-Grandense	Guaporé	Guaporé
Nordeste Rio-Grandense	Guaporé	Ilópolis
Nordeste Rio-Grandense	Guaporé	Itapuca
Nordeste Rio-Grandense	Guaporé	Montauri
Nordeste Rio-Grandense	Guaporé	Nova Alvorada
Nordeste Rio-Grandense	Guaporé	Nova Araçá
Nordeste Rio-Grandense	Guaporé	Nova Bassano
Nordeste Rio-Grandense	Guaporé	Nova Prata
Nordeste Rio-Grandense	Guaporé	Paraí
Nordeste Rio-Grandense	Guaporé	Protásio Alves
Nordeste Rio-Grandense	Guaporé	Putinga
Nordeste Rio-Grandense	Guaporé	São Jorge
Nordeste Rio-Grandense	Guaporé	São Valentim do Sul
Nordeste Rio-Grandense	Guaporé	Serafina Corrêa
Nordeste Rio-Grandense	Guaporé	União da Serra
Nordeste Rio-Grandense	Guaporé	Vista Alegre do Prata
Nordeste Rio-Grandense	Vacaria	Bom Jesus
Nordeste Rio-Grandense	Vacaria	Cambará do Sul
Nordeste Rio-Grandense	Vacaria	Campestre da Serra
Nordeste Rio-Grandense	Vacaria	Capão Bonito do Sul
Nordeste Rio-Grandense	Vacaria	Esmeralda
Nordeste Rio-Grandense	Vacaria	Ipê
Nordeste Rio-Grandense	Vacaria	Jaquirana
Nordeste Rio-Grandense	Vacaria	Lagoa Vermelha
Nordeste Rio-Grandense	Vacaria	Monte Alegre dos Campos
Nordeste Rio-Grandense	Vacaria	Muitos Capões
Nordeste Rio-Grandense	Vacaria	Pinhal da Serra
Nordeste Rio-Grandense	Vacaria	São Francisco de Paula
Nordeste Rio-Grandense	Vacaria	São José dos Ausentes
Nordeste Rio-Grandense	Vacaria	Vacaria
Noroeste Rio-Grandense	Carazinho	Almirante Tamandaré do Sul
Noroeste Rio-Grandense	Carazinho	Barra Funda
Noroeste Rio-Grandense	Carazinho	Boa Vista das Missões
Noroeste Rio-Grandense	Carazinho	Carazinho
Noroeste Rio-Grandense	Carazinho	Cerro Grande
Noroeste Rio-Grandense	Carazinho	Chapada
Noroeste Rio-Grandense	Carazinho	Coqueiros do Sul
Noroeste Rio-Grandense	Carazinho	Jaboticaba
Noroeste Rio-Grandense	Carazinho	Lajeado do Bugre
Noroeste Rio-Grandense	Carazinho	Nova Boa Vista
Noroeste Rio-Grandense	Carazinho	Novo Barreiro
Noroeste Rio-Grandense	Carazinho	Palmeira das Missões
Noroeste Rio-Grandense	Carazinho	Pinhal
Noroeste Rio-Grandense	Carazinho	Sagrada Família
Noroeste Rio-Grandense	Carazinho	Santo Antônio do Planalto
Noroeste Rio-Grandense	Carazinho	São José das Missões
Noroeste Rio-Grandense	Carazinho	São Pedro das Missões
Noroeste Rio-Grandense	Carazinho	Sarandi
Noroeste Rio-Grandense	Cerro Largo	Caibaté
Noroeste Rio-Grandense	Cerro Largo	Campina das Missões
Noroeste Rio-Grandense	Cerro Largo	Cerro Largo
Noroeste Rio-Grandense	Cerro Largo	Guarani das Missões
Noroeste Rio-Grandense	Cerro Largo	Mato Queimado
Noroeste Rio-Grandense	Cerro Largo	Porto Xavier
Noroeste Rio-Grandense	Cerro Largo	Roque Gonzales
Noroeste Rio-Grandense	Cerro Largo	Salvador das Missões
Noroeste Rio-Grandense	Cerro Largo	São Paulo das Missões
Noroeste Rio-Grandense	Cerro Largo	São Pedro do Butiá
Noroeste Rio-Grandense	Cerro Largo	Sete de Setembro
Noroeste Rio-Grandense	Cruz Alta	Alto Alegre
Noroeste Rio-Grandense	Cruz Alta	Boa Vista do Cadeado
Noroeste Rio-Grandense	Cruz Alta	Boa Vista do Incra
Noroeste Rio-Grandense	Cruz Alta	Campos Borges
Noroeste Rio-Grandense	Cruz Alta	Cruz Alta
Noroeste Rio-Grandense	Cruz Alta	Espumoso
Noroeste Rio-Grandense	Cruz Alta	Fortaleza dos Valos
Noroeste Rio-Grandense	Cruz Alta	Ibirubá
Noroeste Rio-Grandense	Cruz Alta	Jacuizinho
Noroeste Rio-Grandense	Cruz Alta	Jóia
Noroeste Rio-Grandense	Cruz Alta	Quinze de Novembro
Noroeste Rio-Grandense	Cruz Alta	Saldanha Marinho
Noroeste Rio-Grandense	Cruz Alta	Salto do Jacuí
Noroeste Rio-Grandense	Cruz Alta	Santa Bárbara do Sul
Noroeste Rio-Grandense	Erechim	Aratiba
Noroeste Rio-Grandense	Erechim	Áurea
Noroeste Rio-Grandense	Erechim	Barão de Cotegipe
Noroeste Rio-Grandense	Erechim	Barra do Rio Azul
Noroeste Rio-Grandense	Erechim	Benjamin Constant do Sul
Noroeste Rio-Grandense	Erechim	Campinas do Sul
Noroeste Rio-Grandense	Erechim	Carlos Gomes
Noroeste Rio-Grandense	Erechim	Centenário
Noroeste Rio-Grandense	Erechim	Cruzaltense
Noroeste Rio-Grandense	Erechim	Entre Rios do Sul
Noroeste Rio-Grandense	Erechim	Erebango
Noroeste Rio-Grandense	Erechim	Erechim
Noroeste Rio-Grandense	Erechim	Erval Grande
Noroeste Rio-Grandense	Erechim	Estação
Noroeste Rio-Grandense	Erechim	Faxinalzinho
Noroeste Rio-Grandense	Erechim	Floriano Peixoto
Noroeste Rio-Grandense	Erechim	Gaurama
Noroeste Rio-Grandense	Erechim	Getúlio Vargas
Noroeste Rio-Grandense	Erechim	Ipiranga do Sul
Noroeste Rio-Grandense	Erechim	Itatiba do Sul
Noroeste Rio-Grandense	Erechim	Jacutinga
Noroeste Rio-Grandense	Erechim	Marcelino Ramos
Noroeste Rio-Grandense	Erechim	Mariano Moro
Noroeste Rio-Grandense	Erechim	Paulo Bento
Noroeste Rio-Grandense	Erechim	Ponte Preta
Noroeste Rio-Grandense	Erechim	Quatro Irmãos
Noroeste Rio-Grandense	Erechim	São Valentim
Noroeste Rio-Grandense	Erechim	Severiano de Almeida
Noroeste Rio-Grandense	Erechim	Três Arroios
Noroeste Rio-Grandense	Erechim	Viadutos
Noroeste Rio-Grandense	Frederico Westphalen	Alpestre
Noroeste Rio-Grandense	Frederico Westphalen	Ametista do Sul
Noroeste Rio-Grandense	Frederico Westphalen	Caiçara
Noroeste Rio-Grandense	Frederico Westphalen	Constantina
Noroeste Rio-Grandense	Frederico Westphalen	Cristal do Sul
Noroeste Rio-Grandense	Frederico Westphalen	Dois Irmãos das Missões
Noroeste Rio-Grandense	Frederico Westphalen	Engenho Velho
Noroeste Rio-Grandense	Frederico Westphalen	Erval Seco
Noroeste Rio-Grandense	Frederico Westphalen	Frederico Westphalen
Noroeste Rio-Grandense	Frederico Westphalen	Gramado dos Loureiros
Noroeste Rio-Grandense	Frederico Westphalen	Iraí
Noroeste Rio-Grandense	Frederico Westphalen	Liberato Salzano
Noroeste Rio-Grandense	Frederico Westphalen	Nonoai
Noroeste Rio-Grandense	Frederico Westphalen	Novo Tiradentes
Noroeste Rio-Grandense	Frederico Westphalen	Novo Xingu
Noroeste Rio-Grandense	Frederico Westphalen	Palmitinho
Noroeste Rio-Grandense	Frederico Westphalen	Pinheirinho do Vale
Noroeste Rio-Grandense	Frederico Westphalen	Planalto
Noroeste Rio-Grandense	Frederico Westphalen	Rio dos Índios
Noroeste Rio-Grandense	Frederico Westphalen	Rodeio Bonito
Noroeste Rio-Grandense	Frederico Westphalen	Rondinha
Noroeste Rio-Grandense	Frederico Westphalen	Seberi
Noroeste Rio-Grandense	Frederico Westphalen	Taquaruçu do Sul
Noroeste Rio-Grandense	Frederico Westphalen	Três Palmeiras
Noroeste Rio-Grandense	Frederico Westphalen	Trindade do Sul
Noroeste Rio-Grandense	Frederico Westphalen	Vicente Dutra
Noroeste Rio-Grandense	Frederico Westphalen	Vista Alegre
Noroeste Rio-Grandense	Ijuí	Ajuricaba
Noroeste Rio-Grandense	Ijuí	Alegria
Noroeste Rio-Grandense	Ijuí	Augusto Pestana
Noroeste Rio-Grandense	Ijuí	Bozano
Noroeste Rio-Grandense	Ijuí	Chiapeta
Noroeste Rio-Grandense	Ijuí	Condor
Noroeste Rio-Grandense	Ijuí	Coronel Barros
Noroeste Rio-Grandense	Ijuí	Coronel Bicaco
Noroeste Rio-Grandense	Ijuí	Ijuí
Noroeste Rio-Grandense	Ijuí	Inhacorá
Noroeste Rio-Grandense	Ijuí	Nova Ramada
Noroeste Rio-Grandense	Ijuí	Panambi
Noroeste Rio-Grandense	Ijuí	Pejuçara
Noroeste Rio-Grandense	Ijuí	Santo Augusto
Noroeste Rio-Grandense	Ijuí	São Valério do Sul
Noroeste Rio-Grandense	Não-Me-Toque	Colorado
Noroeste Rio-Grandense	Não-Me-Toque	Lagoa dos Três Cantos
Noroeste Rio-Grandense	Não-Me-Toque	Não-Me-Toque
Noroeste Rio-Grandense	Não-Me-Toque	Selbach
Noroeste Rio-Grandense	Não-Me-Toque	Tapera
Noroeste Rio-Grandense	Não-Me-Toque	Tio Hugo
Noroeste Rio-Grandense	Não-Me-Toque	Victor Graeff
Noroeste Rio-Grandense	Passo Fundo	Água Santa
Noroeste Rio-Grandense	Passo Fundo	Camargo
Noroeste Rio-Grandense	Passo Fundo	Casca
Noroeste Rio-Grandense	Passo Fundo	Caseiros
Noroeste Rio-Grandense	Passo Fundo	Charrua
Noroeste Rio-Grandense	Passo Fundo	Ciríaco
Noroeste Rio-Grandense	Passo Fundo	Coxilha
Noroeste Rio-Grandense	Passo Fundo	David Canabarro
Noroeste Rio-Grandense	Passo Fundo	Ernestina
Noroeste Rio-Grandense	Passo Fundo	Gentil
Noroeste Rio-Grandense	Passo Fundo	Ibiraiaras
Noroeste Rio-Grandense	Passo Fundo	Marau
Noroeste Rio-Grandense	Passo Fundo	Mato Castelhano
Noroeste Rio-Grandense	Passo Fundo	Muliterno
Noroeste Rio-Grandense	Passo Fundo	Nicolau Vergueiro
Noroeste Rio-Grandense	Passo Fundo	Passo Fundo
Noroeste Rio-Grandense	Passo Fundo	Pontão
Noroeste Rio-Grandense	Passo Fundo	Ronda Alta
Noroeste Rio-Grandense	Passo Fundo	Santa Cecília do Sul
Noroeste Rio-Grandense	Passo Fundo	Santo Antônio do Palma
Noroeste Rio-Grandense	Passo Fundo	São Domingos do Sul
Noroeste Rio-Grandense	Passo Fundo	Sertão
Noroeste Rio-Grandense	Passo Fundo	Tapejara
Noroeste Rio-Grandense	Passo Fundo	Vanini
Noroeste Rio-Grandense	Passo Fundo	Vila Lângaro
Noroeste Rio-Grandense	Passo Fundo	Vila Maria
Noroeste Rio-Grandense	Sananduva	Barracão
Noroeste Rio-Grandense	Sananduva	Cacique Doble
Noroeste Rio-Grandense	Sananduva	Ibiaçá
Noroeste Rio-Grandense	Sananduva	Machadinho
Noroeste Rio-Grandense	Sananduva	Maximiliano de Almeida
Noroeste Rio-Grandense	Sananduva	Paim Filho
Noroeste Rio-Grandense	Sananduva	Sananduva
Noroeste Rio-Grandense	Sananduva	Santo Expedito do Sul
Noroeste Rio-Grandense	Sananduva	São João da Urtiga
Noroeste Rio-Grandense	Sananduva	São José do Ouro
Noroeste Rio-Grandense	Sananduva	Tupanci do Sul
Noroeste Rio-Grandense	Santa Rosa	Alecrim
Noroeste Rio-Grandense	Santa Rosa	Cândido Godói
Noroeste Rio-Grandense	Santa Rosa	Independência
Noroeste Rio-Grandense	Santa Rosa	Novo Machado
Noroeste Rio-Grandense	Santa Rosa	Porto Lucena
Noroeste Rio-Grandense	Santa Rosa	Porto Mauá
Noroeste Rio-Grandense	Santa Rosa	Porto Vera Cruz
Noroeste Rio-Grandense	Santa Rosa	Santa Rosa
Noroeste Rio-Grandense	Santa Rosa	Santo Cristo
Noroeste Rio-Grandense	Santa Rosa	São José do Inhacorá
Noroeste Rio-Grandense	Santa Rosa	Três de Maio
Noroeste Rio-Grandense	Santa Rosa	Tucunduva
Noroeste Rio-Grandense	Santa Rosa	Tuparendi
Noroeste Rio-Grandense	Santo Ângelo	Bossoroca
Noroeste Rio-Grandense	Santo Ângelo	Catuípe
Noroeste Rio-Grandense	Santo Ângelo	Dezesseis de Novembro
Noroeste Rio-Grandense	Santo Ângelo	Entre-Ijuís
Noroeste Rio-Grandense	Santo Ângelo	Eugênio de Castro
Noroeste Rio-Grandense	Santo Ângelo	Giruá
Noroeste Rio-Grandense	Santo Ângelo	Pirapó
Noroeste Rio-Grandense	Santo Ângelo	Rolador
Noroeste Rio-Grandense	Santo Ângelo	Santo Ângelo
Noroeste Rio-Grandense	Santo Ângelo	Santo Antônio das Missões
Noroeste Rio-Grandense	Santo Ângelo	São Luiz Gonzaga
Noroeste Rio-Grandense	Santo Ângelo	São Miguel das Missões
Noroeste Rio-Grandense	Santo Ângelo	São Nicolau
Noroeste Rio-Grandense	Santo Ângelo	Senador Salgado Filho
Noroeste Rio-Grandense	Santo Ângelo	Ubiretama
Noroeste Rio-Grandense	Santo Ângelo	Vitória das Missões
Noroeste Rio-Grandense	Soledade	Barros Cassal
Noroeste Rio-Grandense	Soledade	Fontoura Xavier
Noroeste Rio-Grandense	Soledade	Ibirapuitã
Noroeste Rio-Grandense	Soledade	Lagoão
Noroeste Rio-Grandense	Soledade	Mormaço
Noroeste Rio-Grandense	Soledade	São José do Herval
Noroeste Rio-Grandense	Soledade	Soledade
Noroeste Rio-Grandense	Soledade	Tunas
Noroeste Rio-Grandense	Três Passos	Barra do Guarita
Noroeste Rio-Grandense	Três Passos	Boa Vista do Buricá
Noroeste Rio-Grandense	Três Passos	Bom Progresso
Noroeste Rio-Grandense	Três Passos	Braga
Noroeste Rio-Grandense	Três Passos	Campo Novo
Noroeste Rio-Grandense	Três Passos	Crissiumal
Noroeste Rio-Grandense	Três Passos	Derrubadas
Noroeste Rio-Grandense	Três Passos	Doutor Maurício Cardoso
Noroeste Rio-Grandense	Três Passos	Esperança do Sul
Noroeste Rio-Grandense	Três Passos	Horizontina
Noroeste Rio-Grandense	Três Passos	Humaitá
Noroeste Rio-Grandense	Três Passos	Miraguaí
Noroeste Rio-Grandense	Três Passos	Nova Candelária
Noroeste Rio-Grandense	Três Passos	Redentora
Noroeste Rio-Grandense	Três Passos	São Martinho
Noroeste Rio-Grandense	Três Passos	Sede Nova
Noroeste Rio-Grandense	Três Passos	Tenente Portela
Noroeste Rio-Grandense	Três Passos	Tiradentes do Sul
Noroeste Rio-Grandense	Três Passos	Três Passos
Noroeste Rio-Grandense	Três Passos	Vista Gaúcha
Sudeste Rio-Grandense	Jaguarão	Arroio Grande
Sudeste Rio-Grandense	Jaguarão	Herval
Sudeste Rio-Grandense	Jaguarão	Jaguarão
Sudeste Rio-Grandense	Litoral Lagunar	Chuí
Sudeste Rio-Grandense	Litoral Lagunar	Rio Grande
Sudeste Rio-Grandense	Litoral Lagunar	Santa Vitória do Palmar
Sudeste Rio-Grandense	Litoral Lagunar	São José do Norte
Sudeste Rio-Grandense	Pelotas	Arroio do Padre
Sudeste Rio-Grandense	Pelotas	Canguçu
Sudeste Rio-Grandense	Pelotas	Capão do Leão
Sudeste Rio-Grandense	Pelotas	Cerrito
Sudeste Rio-Grandense	Pelotas	Cristal
Sudeste Rio-Grandense	Pelotas	Morro Redondo
Sudeste Rio-Grandense	Pelotas	Pedro Osório
Sudeste Rio-Grandense	Pelotas	Pelotas
Sudeste Rio-Grandense	Pelotas	São Lourenço do Sul
Sudeste Rio-Grandense	Pelotas	Turuçu
Sudeste Rio-Grandense	Serras do Sudeste	Amaral Ferrador
Sudeste Rio-Grandense	Serras do Sudeste	Caçapava do Sul
Sudeste Rio-Grandense	Serras do Sudeste	Candiota
Sudeste Rio-Grandense	Serras do Sudeste	Encruzilhada do Sul
Sudeste Rio-Grandense	Serras do Sudeste	Pedras Altas
Sudeste Rio-Grandense	Serras do Sudeste	Pinheiro Machado
Sudeste Rio-Grandense	Serras do Sudeste	Piratini
Sudeste Rio-Grandense	Serras do Sudeste	Santana da Boa Vista
Sudoeste Rio-Grandense	Campanha Central	Rosário do Sul
Sudoeste Rio-Grandense	Campanha Central	Santa Margarida do Sul
Sudoeste Rio-Grandense	Campanha Central	Santana do Livramento
Sudoeste Rio-Grandense	Campanha Central	São Gabriel
Sudoeste Rio-Grandense	Campanha Meridional	Aceguá
Sudoeste Rio-Grandense	Campanha Meridional	Bagé
Sudoeste Rio-Grandense	Campanha Meridional	Dom Pedrito
Sudoeste Rio-Grandense	Campanha Meridional	Hulha Negra
Sudoeste Rio-Grandense	Campanha Meridional	Lavras do Sul
Sudoeste Rio-Grandense	Campanha Ocidental	Alegrete
Sudoeste Rio-Grandense	Campanha Ocidental	Barra do Quaraí
Sudoeste Rio-Grandense	Campanha Ocidental	Garruchos
Sudoeste Rio-Grandense	Campanha Ocidental	Itaqui
Sudoeste Rio-Grandense	Campanha Ocidental	Maçambara
Sudoeste Rio-Grandense	Campanha Ocidental	Manoel Viana
Sudoeste Rio-Grandense	Campanha Ocidental	São Borja
Sudoeste Rio-Grandense	Campanha Ocidental	São Francisco de Assis
Sudoeste Rio-Grandense	Campanha Ocidental	Uruguaiana
Sudoeste Rio-Grandense	Campanha Ocidental	Quaraí

== See also ==
- Geography of Brazil
