= Sede Nova =

Municipality in Rio Grande do Sul, Brazil

Coordinates: 27°38′S 53°58′W

- Municipality
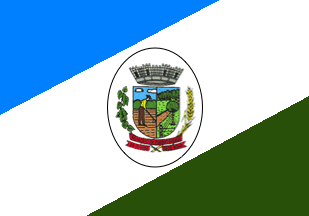
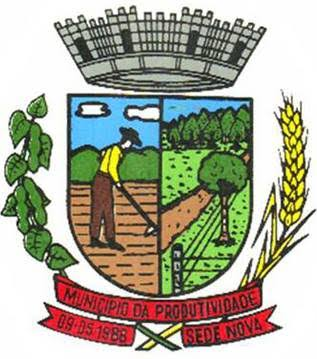
- Flag Coat of arms

- Location of Sede Nova in Rio Grande do Sul
- Country: Brazil
- Region: South
- State: Rio Grande do Sul
- Mesoregion: Noroeste Rio-Grandense
- Microregion: Três Passos
- Founded: 5 September 1988

Government
  - Mayor: Leandro Cortelli Baungrat (PP, 2021 - 2024)

Area
  - Total: 119.312 km^{2} (46.067 sq mi)

Population (2021)
  - Total: 2,875
  - Density: 24.10/km^{2} (62.41/sq mi)
- Demonym: Sedenovense
- Time zone: UTC−3 (BRT)
- Website: Official website

Sede Nova is a municipality in the state of Rio Grande do Sul, Brazil. As of 2020, the estimated population was 2,891. On July 12 2023 A tornado struck The town with F2 damage.

== See also ==
- List of municipalities in Rio Grande do Sul
