= Coqueiros do Sul =

Municipality of Rio Grande do Sul, Brazil

Southern Coconut Trees Coqueiros do Sul
- Municipality
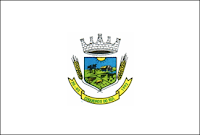
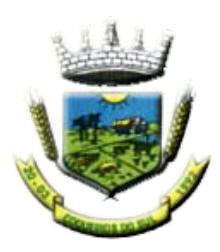
- Flag Coat of arms

- Location in Brazil
- Coordinates: 28.118889°S 52.782778°W
- Country: Brazil
- State: Rio Grande do Sul
- Mesoregion: Noroeste Rio-Grandense
- Microregion: Carazinho
- Founded: March 20, 1992; 34 years ago

Government
  - Mayor: Valoir Chapuis (PP) (2021–2024)

Area
  - Total: 277.6 km^{2} (107.2 sq mi)
- Elevation: 601 m (1,972 ft)

Population (2020)
  - Total: 2,286
  - Density: 8.235/km^{2} (21.33/sq mi)
- Demonym: Coqueirense
- Time zone: UTC−3 (BRT)
- Postal code: 99528-000
- Area code: +54
- Website: www.coqueirosul.com.br

Coqueiros do Sul is a municipality in the North-west of the state of Rio Grande do Sul, Brazil. It's part of the subregion of Carazinho and is situated 306 km to the north-west of Porto Alegre, capital of the state. It is situated on a latitude of -28.118889 and a longitude of -52.782778, and an elevation of 601 meters above the sea level.

It has an area of 277.637 square kilometres (107.196 sq mi) and had a population of roughly 2,286 inhabitants in 2020.

The municipality has a 98.8% schooling percentage. The child mortality rate is 47.62 deaths per 1,000 live births.

Its population are mostly from German descent (60% in its origin, roughly), but also of Italian and Portuguese descent.

== Economy ==
The main economy production of Coqueiros do Sul is agriculture. Soybeans, corn and wheat are the major products.

== Gallery ==
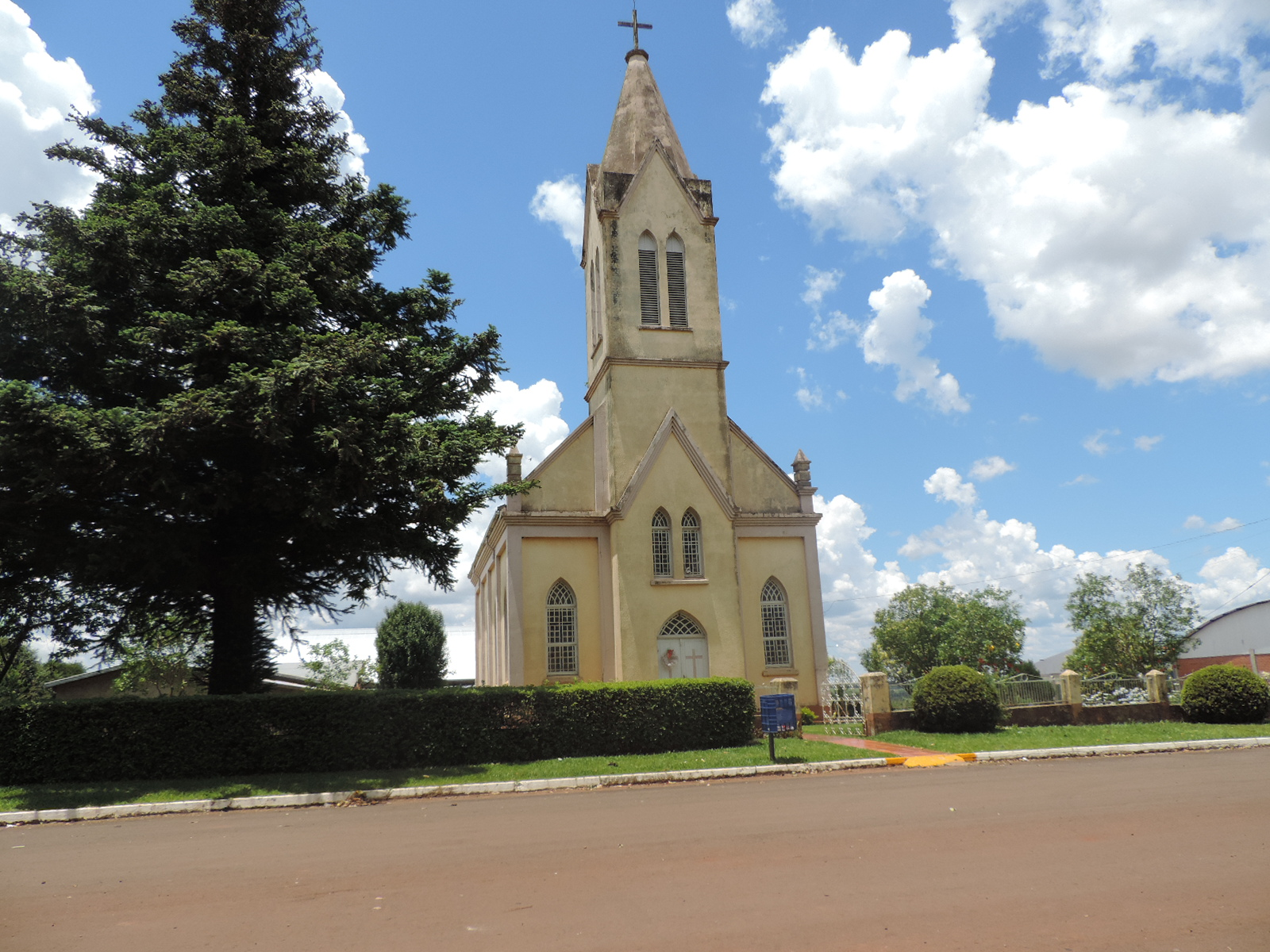
A church in Coqueiros do Sul

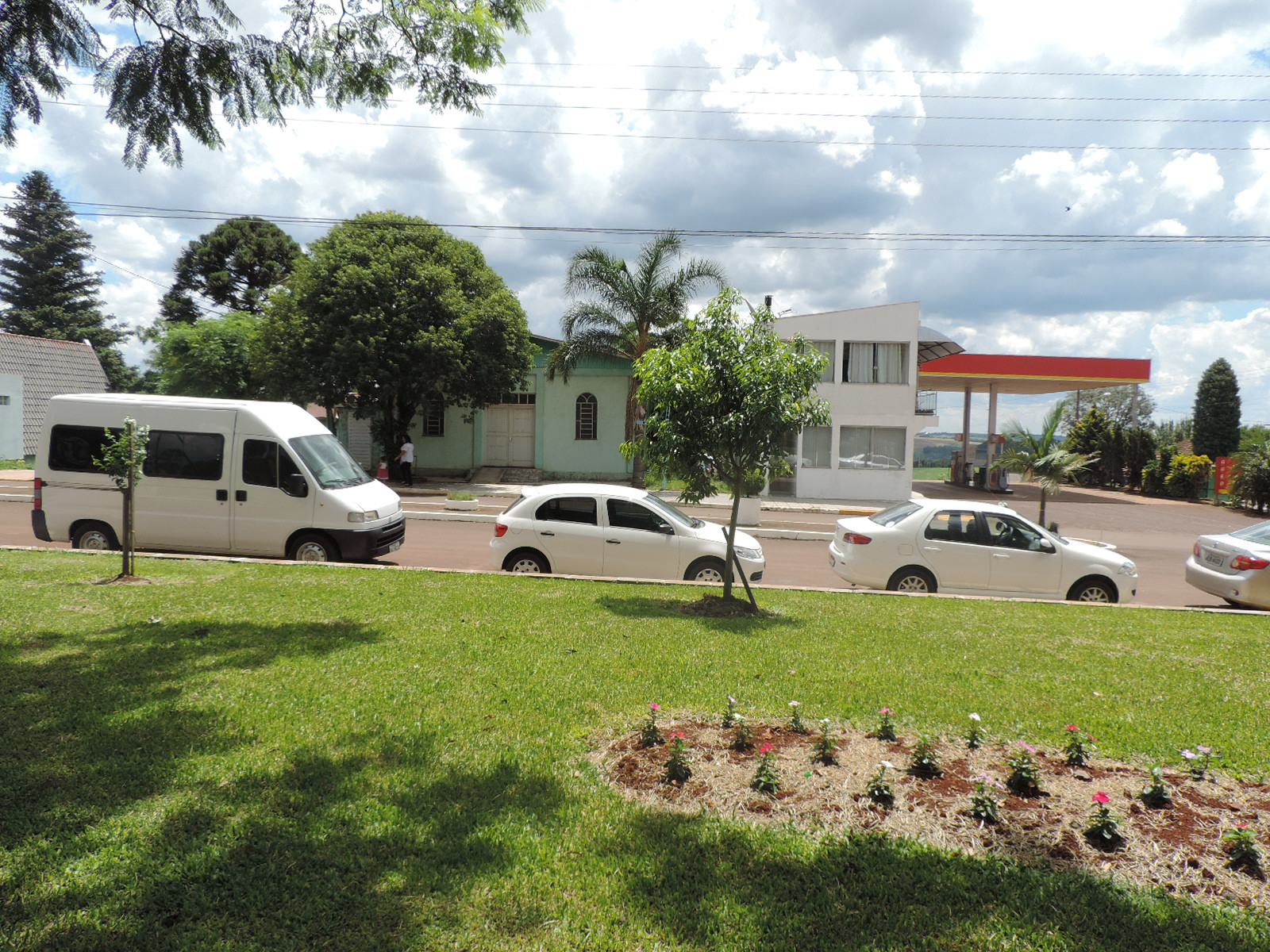

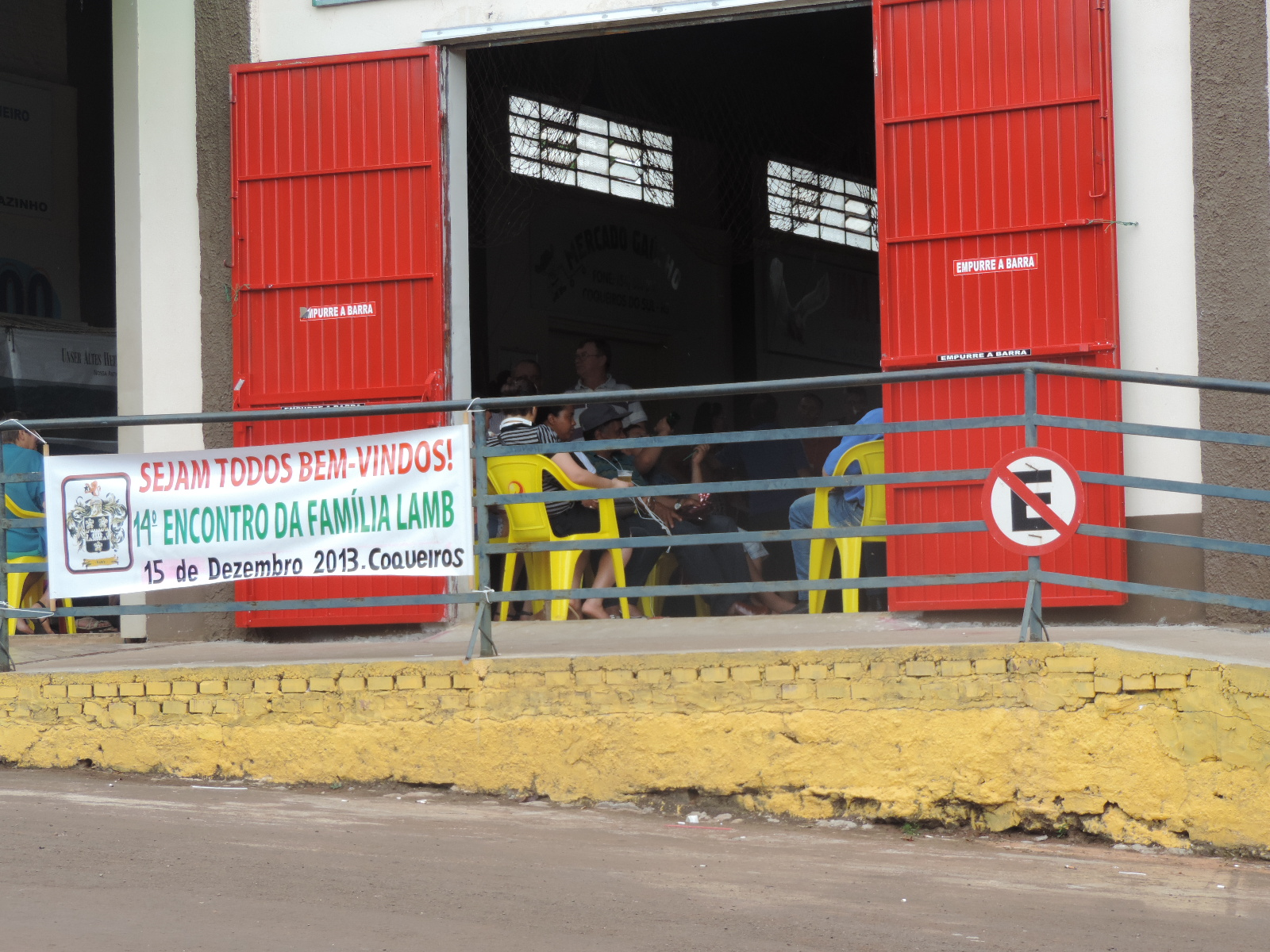
14th Meeting of the Lamb family

== See also ==
- List of municipalities in Rio Grande do Sul
