= Lagoão =

Municipality in Rio Grande do Sul, Brazil

Coordinates: 29°14′06″S 52°47′45″W

- Municipality
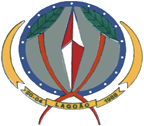
- Flag Coat of arms

- Location of Lagoão in Rio Grande do Sul
- Country: Brazil
- Region: South
- State: Rio Grande do Sul
- Mesoregion: Noroeste Rio-Grandense
- Microregion: Soledad
- Founded: 20 April 1988

Government
  - Mayor: Cirano de Camargo (PDT, 2021 - 2024)

Area
  - Total: 387.455 km^{2} (149.597 sq mi)

Population (2021)
  - Total: 6,469
  - Density: 16.70/km^{2} (43.24/sq mi)
- Demonym: Lagonense
- Time zone: UTC−3 (BRT)
- Website: Official website

Lagoão is a municipality in the state of Rio Grande do Sul, Brazil. As of 2020, the estimated population was 6,461.

== See also ==
- List of municipalities in Rio Grande do Sul
