= Campo Novo =

Municipality in Rio Grande do Sul, Brazil

Coordinates: 27°40′30″S 53°48′10″W

- Municipality
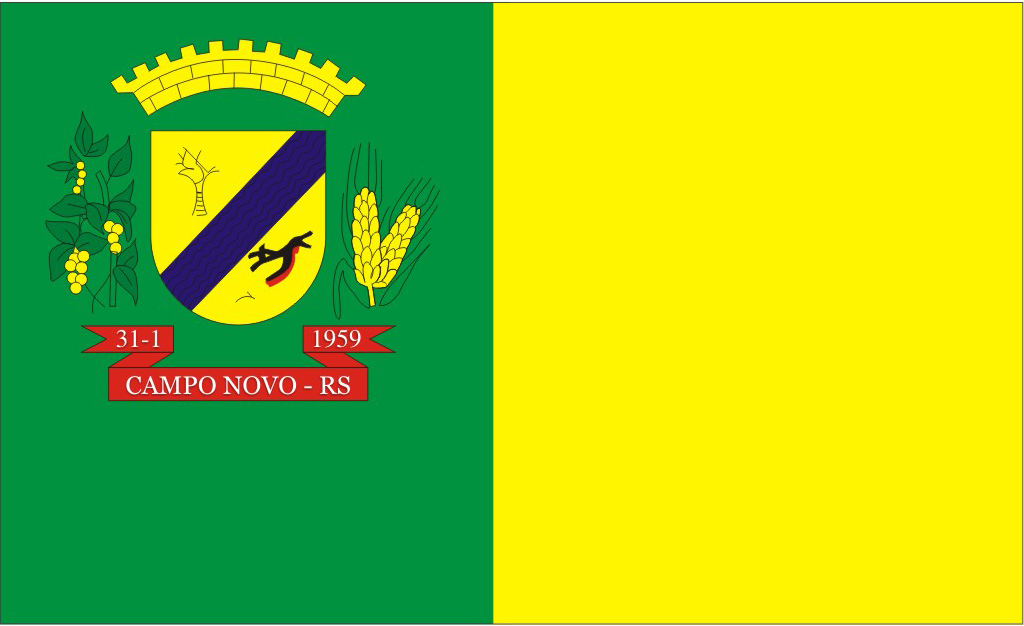
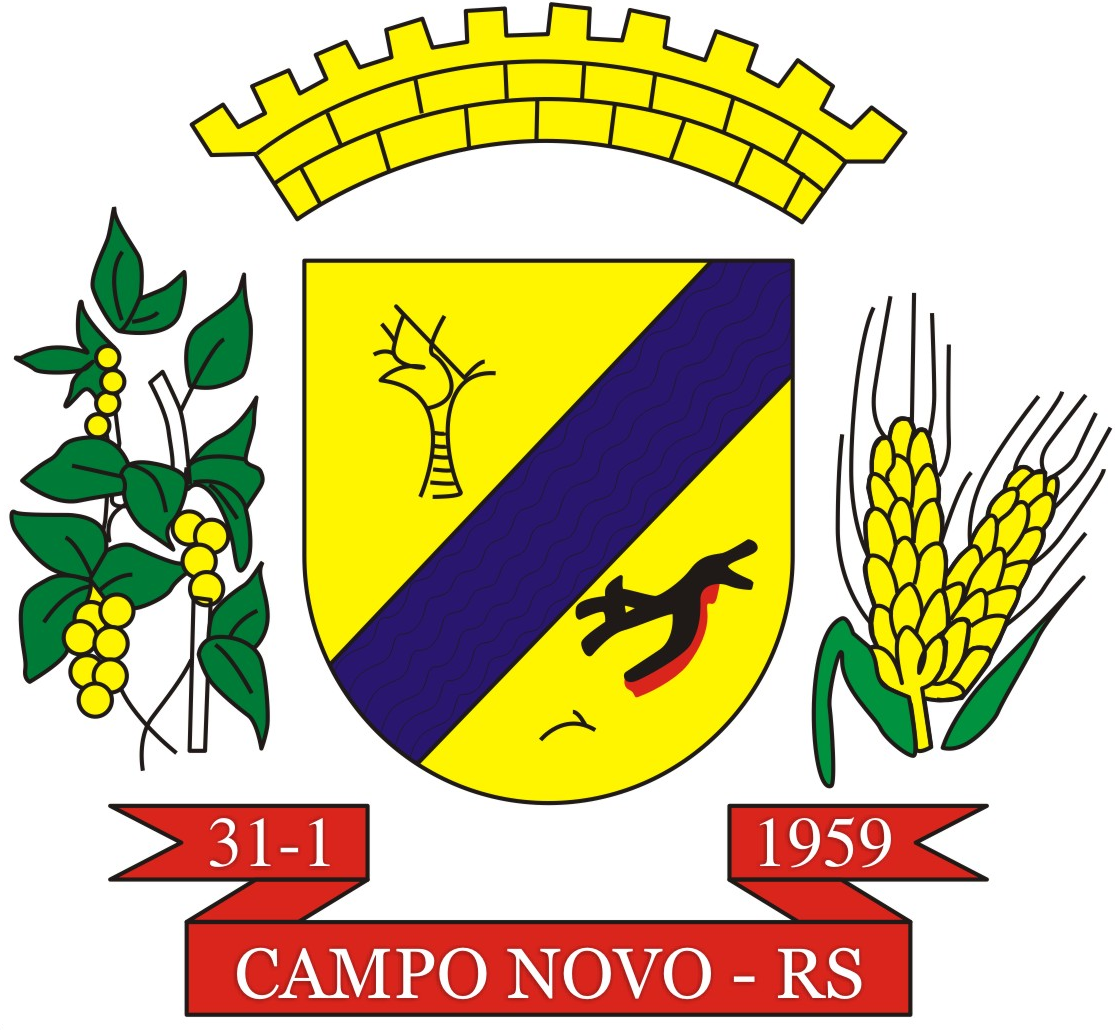
- Flag Coat of arms

- Location of Campo Novo in Rio Grande do Sul
- Country: Brazil
- Region: South
- State: Rio Grande do Sul
- Mesoregion: Noroeste Rio-Grandense
- Microregion: Três Passos
- Founded: 3 June 1959

Government
  - Mayor: Pedro dos Santos (PSB, 2021 - 2024)

Area
  - Total: 220.719 km^{2} (85.220 sq mi)

Population (2021)
  - Total: 4,273
  - Density: 19.36/km^{2} (50.14/sq mi)
- Demonym: Campo-Novense
- Time zone: UTC−3 (BRT)
- Website: Official website

Campo Novo is a municipality in the state of Rio Grande do Sul, Brazil. As of 2020, the estimated population was 4,376.

== See also ==
- List of municipalities in Rio Grande do Sul
