= Nova Candelária =

Municipality in Rio Grande do Sul, Brazil

Coordinates: 27°36′25″S 54°06′25″W

- Municipality
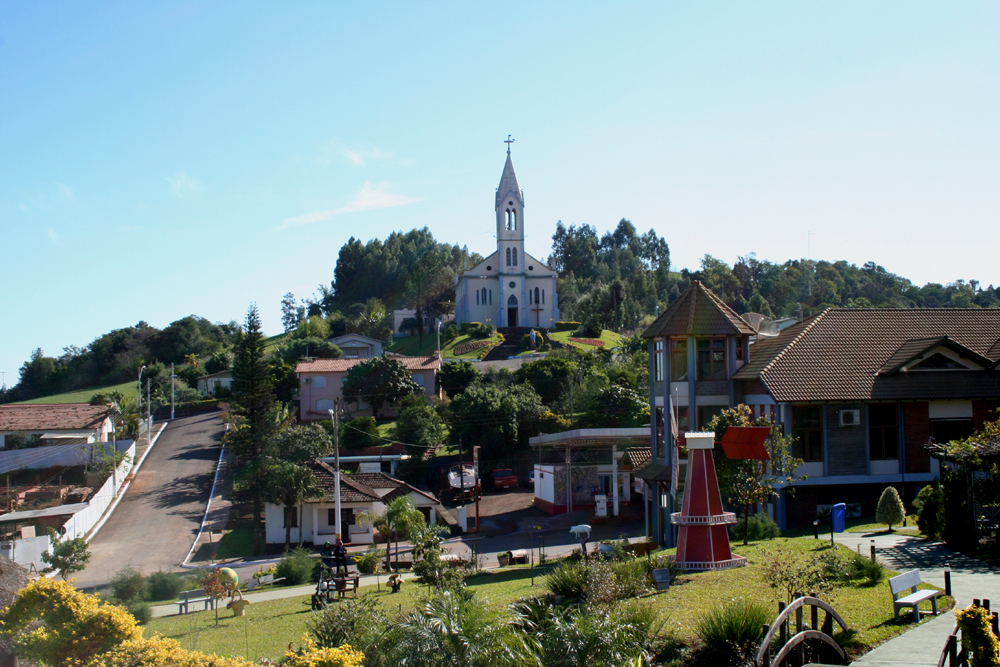

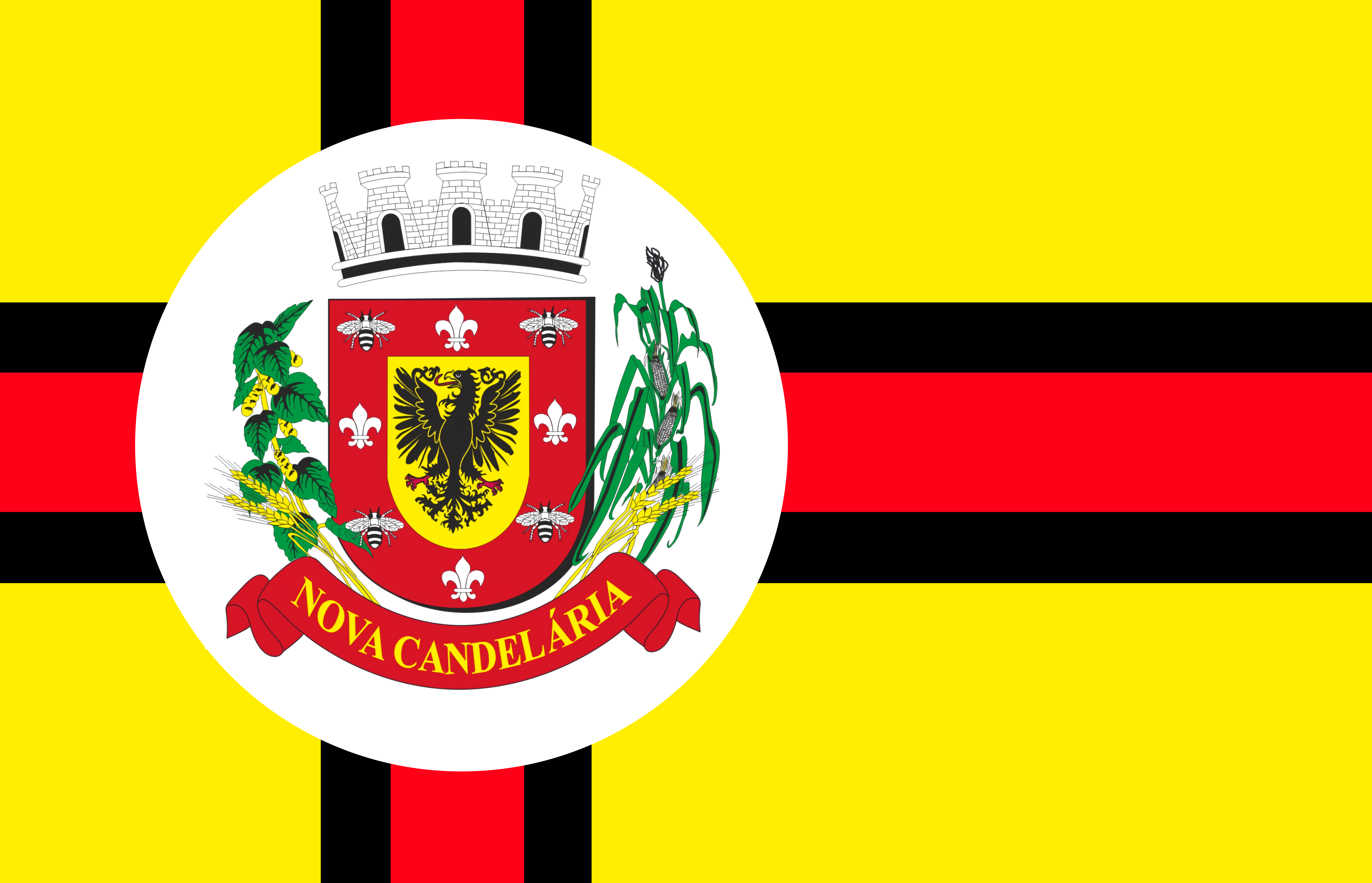
- Flag

- Location of Nova Candelária in Rio Grande do Sul
- Country: Brazil
- Region: South
- State: Rio Grande do Sul
- Mesoregion: Noroeste Rio-Grandense
- Microregion: Três Passos
- Founded: 28 December 1996

Government
  - Mayor: Jorge Ladir Steffler (PDT, 2021 - 2024)

Area
  - Total: 97.579 km^{2} (37.675 sq mi)

Population (2021)
  - Total: 2,677
  - Density: 27.43/km^{2} (71.05/sq mi)
- Demonym: Nova-Candelariense
- Time zone: UTC−3 (BRT)
- Website: Official website

Nova Candelária is a municipality in the state of Rio Grande do Sul, Brazil. As of 2020, the estimated population was 2,688.

== See also ==
- List of municipalities in Rio Grande do Sul
