= São Valentim do Sul =

Municipality in Rio Grande do Sul, Brazil

Coordinates: 29°2′49″S 51°45′54″W

- Municipality
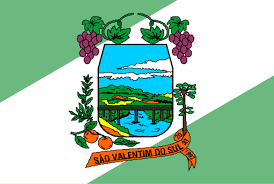
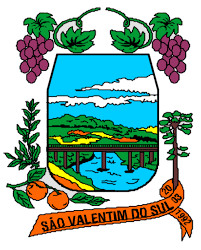
- Flag Coat of arms
- Interactive map of São Valentim do Sul
- Country: Brazil
- Time zone: UTC−3 (BRT)

São Valentim do Sul is a municipality in the state of Rio Grande do Sul, Brazil. It was raised to municipality status in 1992, the area being taken out of the municipality of Dois Lajeados. As of 2020, the estimated population was 2,245.

== See also ==
- List of municipalities in Rio Grande do Sul
