= São Martinho, Rio Grande do Sul =

Municipality in Brazil

Coordinates: 27°42′25″S 53°58′08″W

São Martinho
- Municipality
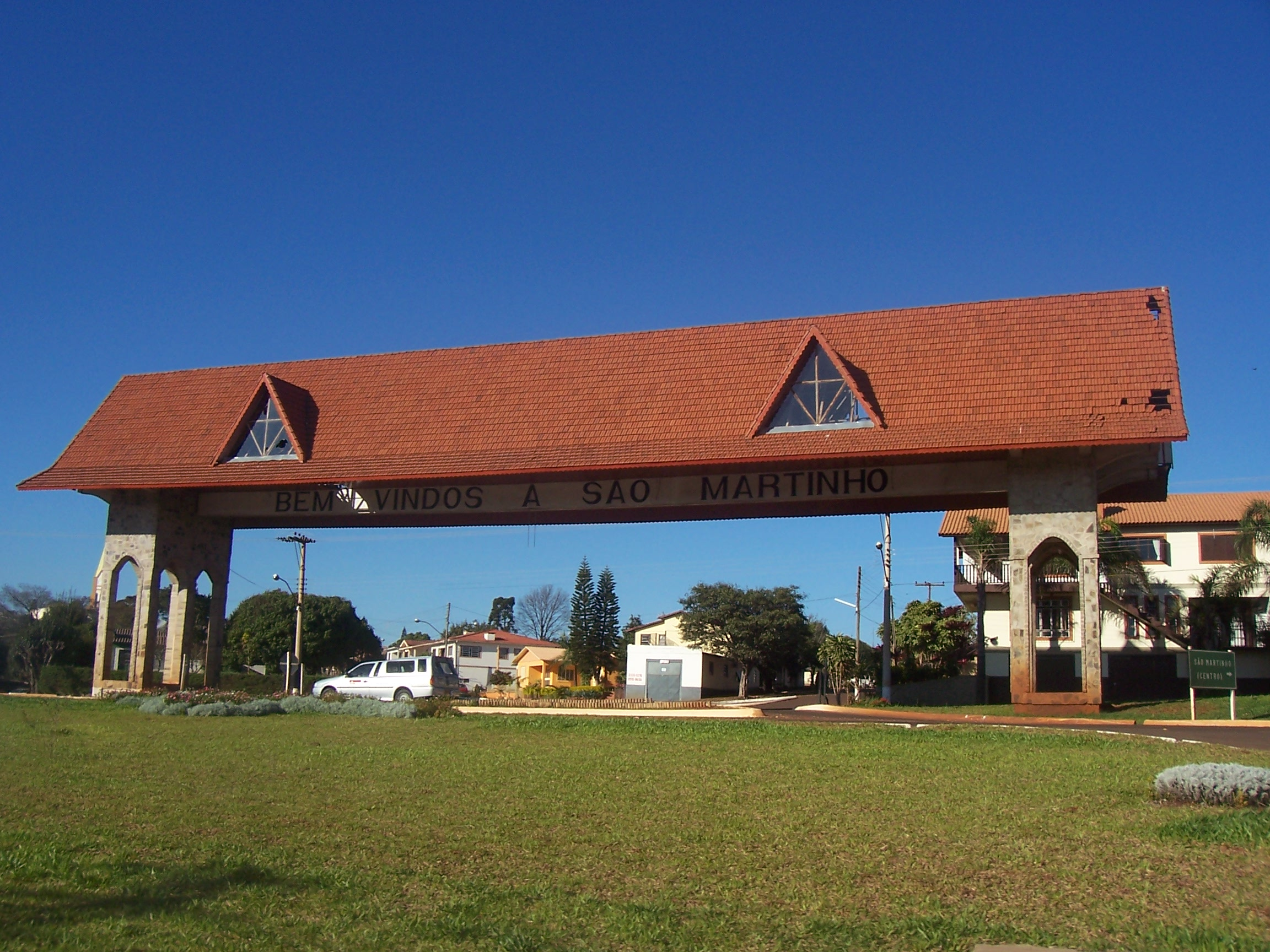

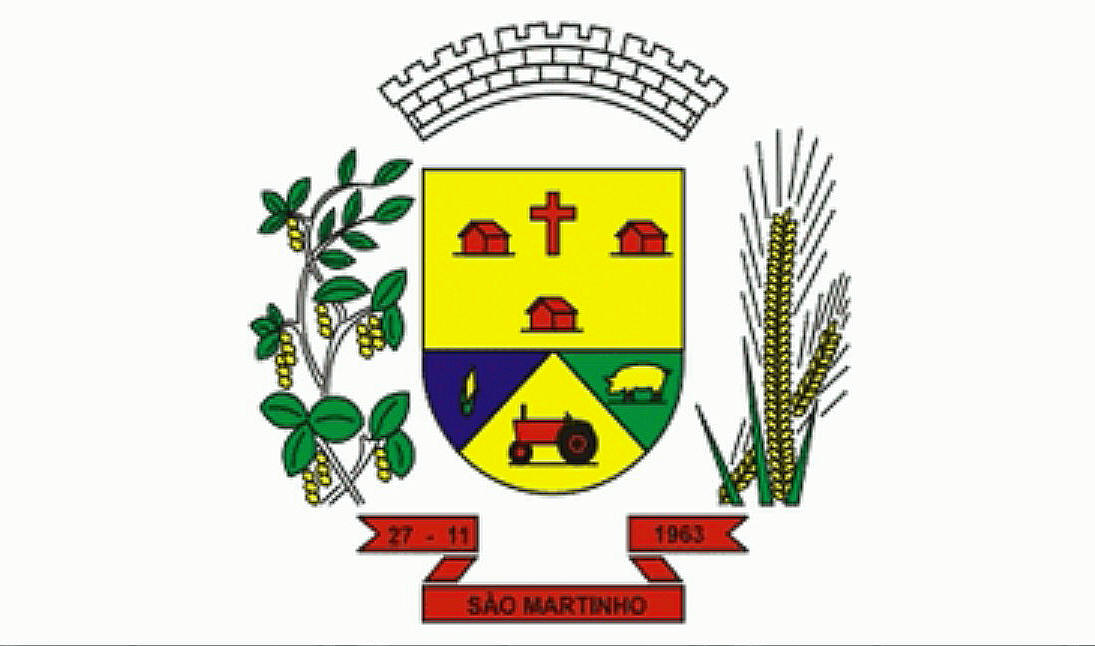
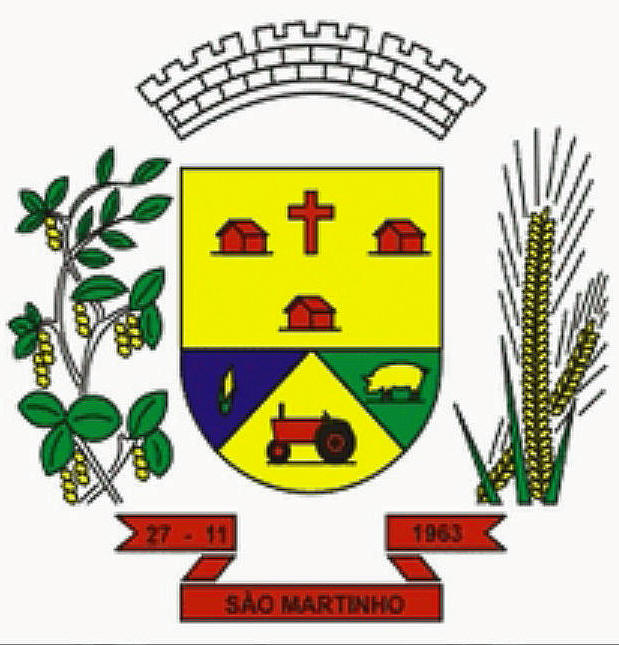
- Flag Coat of arms

- Location of São Martinho in Rio Grande do Sul
- Country: Brazil
- Region: South
- State: Rio Grande do Sul
- Mesoregion: Noroeste Rio-Grandense
- Microregion: Três Passos
- Founded: 27 November 1963

Government
  - Mayor: Jean Hunhoff (PP, 2021 - 2024)

Area
  - Total: 171.245 km^{2} (66.118 sq mi)

Population (2021)
  - Total: 5,336
  - Density: 31.16/km^{2} (80.70/sq mi)
- Demonym: São-Martinhense
- Time zone: UTC−3 (BRT)
- Website: Official website

São Martinho is a municipality in the state of Rio Grande do Sul, Brazil. As of 2020, the estimated population was 5,380.

== See also ==
- List of municipalities in Rio Grande do Sul
