= David Canabarro, Rio Grande do Sul =

Municipality in Brazil

Coordinates: 28°23′16″S 51°50′52″W

- Municipality
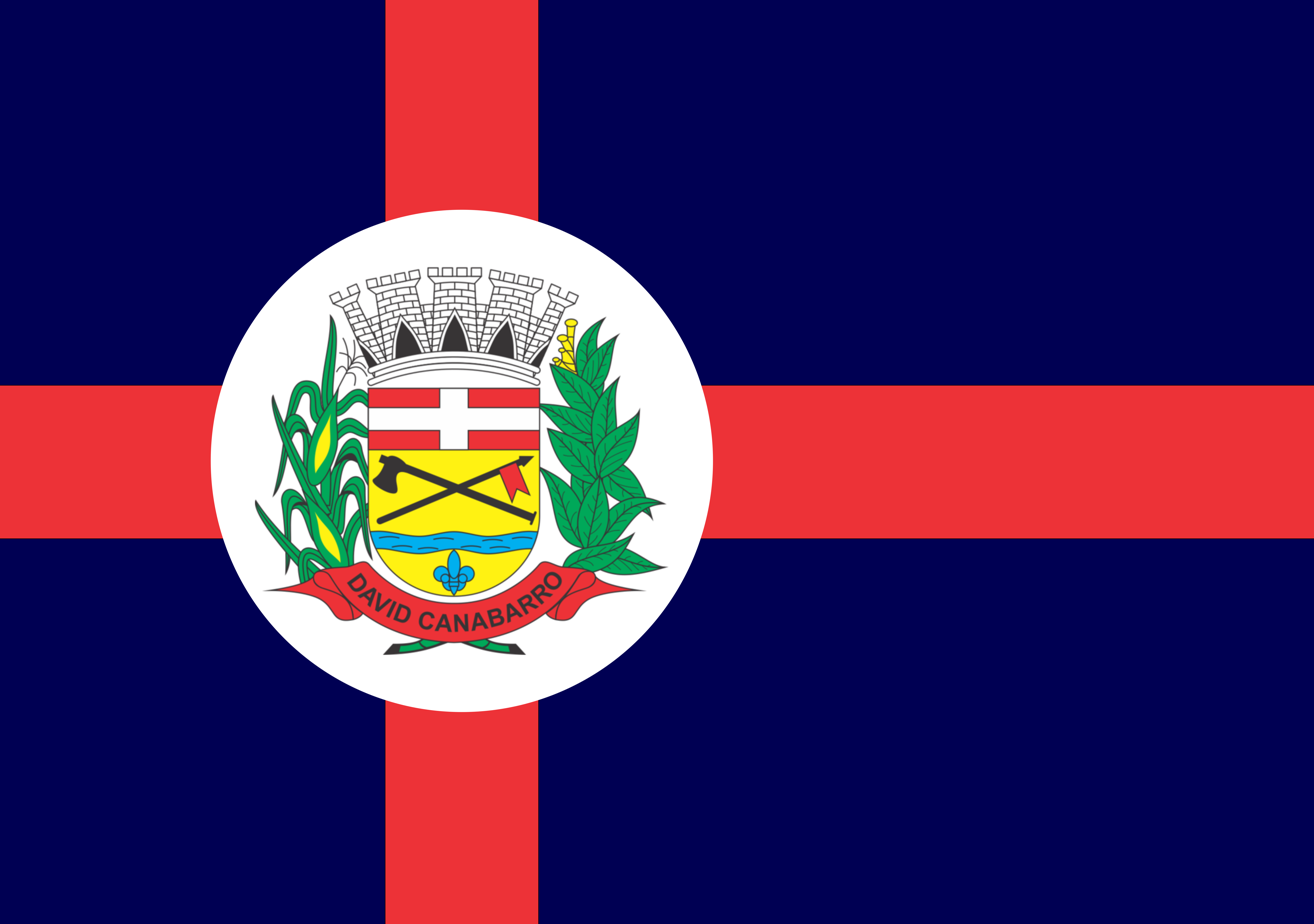
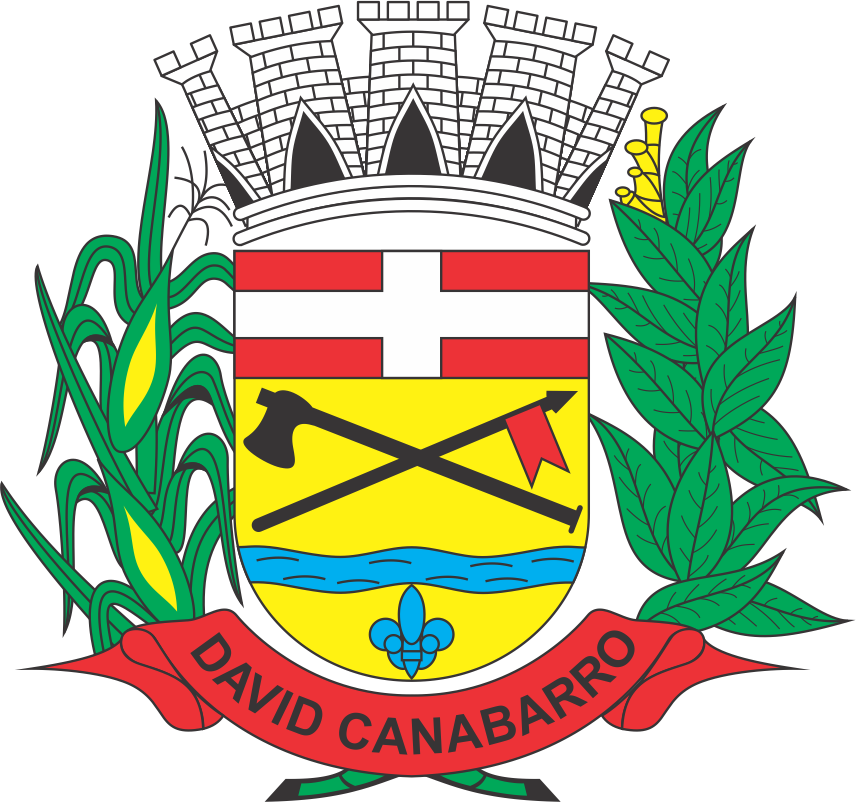
- Flag Coat of arms
- Interactive map of David Canabarro, Rio Grande do Sul
- Country: Brazil
- Time zone: UTC−3 (BRT)

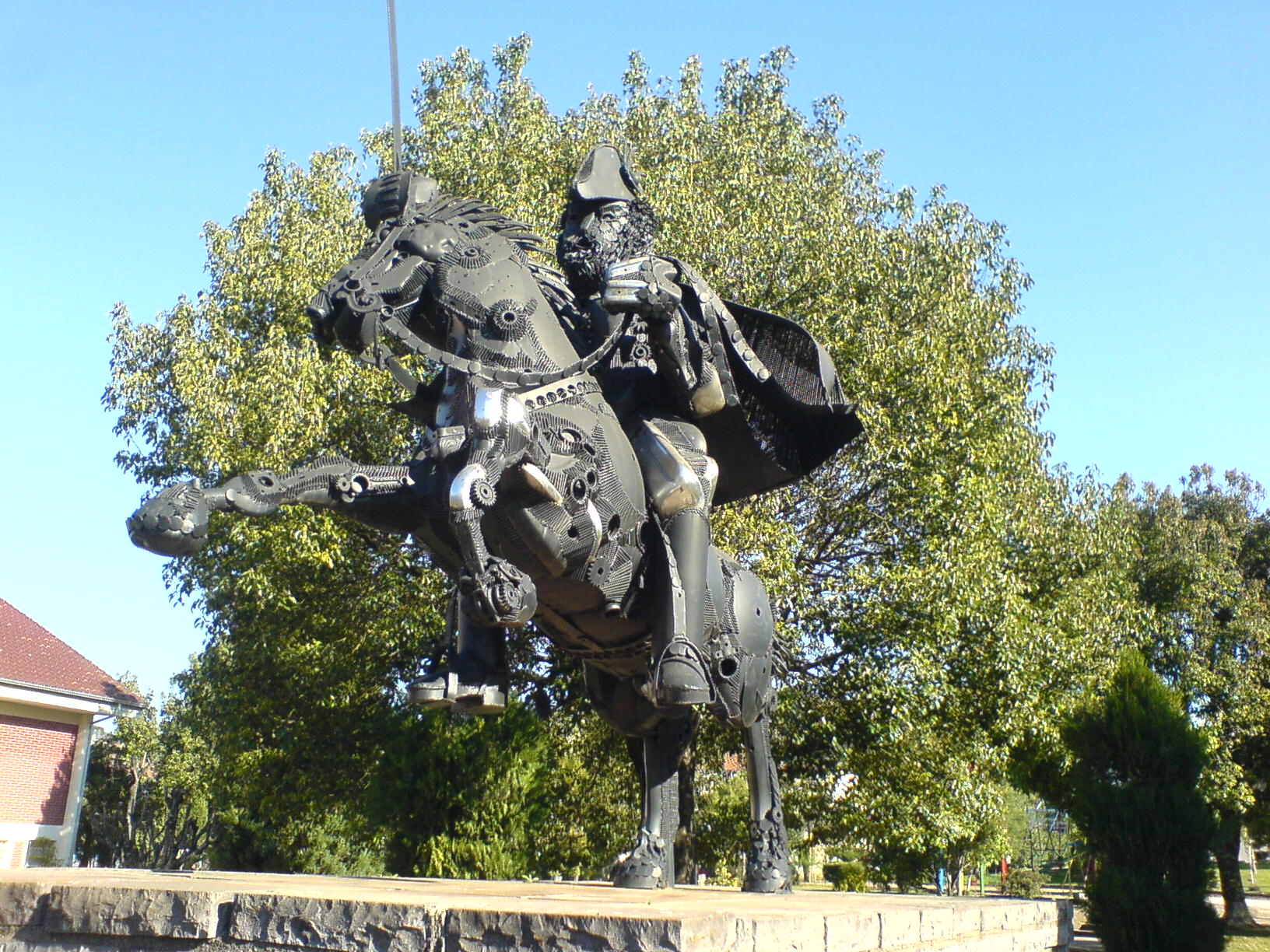
An equestrian sculpture of David Canabarro (1796–1867) in Brazil

David Canabarro is a municipality in the state of Rio Grande do Sul, Brazil. As of 2020, the estimated population was 4,736.

== See also ==
- List of municipalities in Rio Grande do Sul
