= André da Rocha =

Municipality of Rio Grande do Sul, Brazil

- Municipality
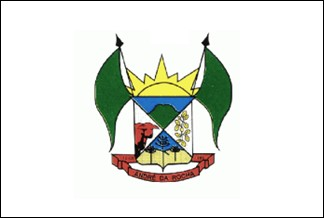
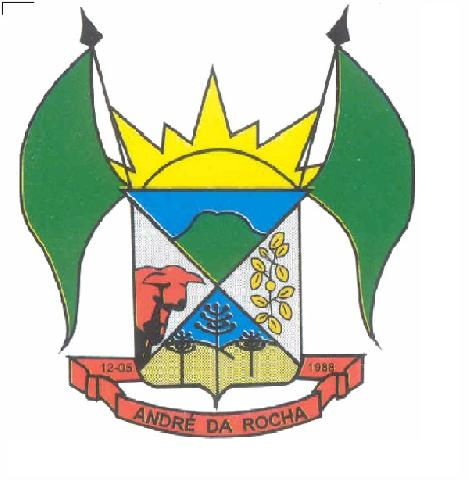
- Flag Coat of arms
- Nickname: "Pequeno Grande Pago"
- Coordinates: 28°37′51″S 51°34′15″W
- Country: Brazil
- State: Rio Grande do Sul
- Mesoregion: Nordeste Rio-grandense
- Microregion: Guaporé
- Founded: May 12, 1988

Government
  - Mayor: Ademir Antônio Zanotto (PP)

Area
  - Total: 329.736 km^{2} (127.312 sq mi)
- Elevation: 700 m (2,300 ft)

Population (2020)
  - Total: 1,343
  - Density: 4.073/km^{2} (10.55/sq mi)
- Time zone: UTC−3 (BRT)
- HDI: 0.815
- GDP: R$ 15,913,000
- GDP per capita: R$13,789.00

André da Rocha (Portuguese: [ɐ̃ˈdɾɛ da ˈʁɔ.ʃɐ]) is a municipality in the state of Rio Grande do Sul, Brazil. It is surrounded by the municipalities Nova Prata, Protásio Alves, and Guabiju.

It was split off from Lagoa Vermelha in 1988, and named in honor of Desembargador Manuel André da Rocha, the first judge of the comarca of Lagoa Vermelha, and active defender of the municipality, which became a Republican redoubt during the Federalist Revolution (1893).

André da Rocha is the least populous city of Rio Grande do Sul, with only 1,343 inhabitants.

== See also ==
- List of municipalities in Rio Grande do Sul
