= Montauri =

Municipality in Rio Grande do Sul, Brazil

Coordinates: 28°39′S 52°04′W

- Municipality
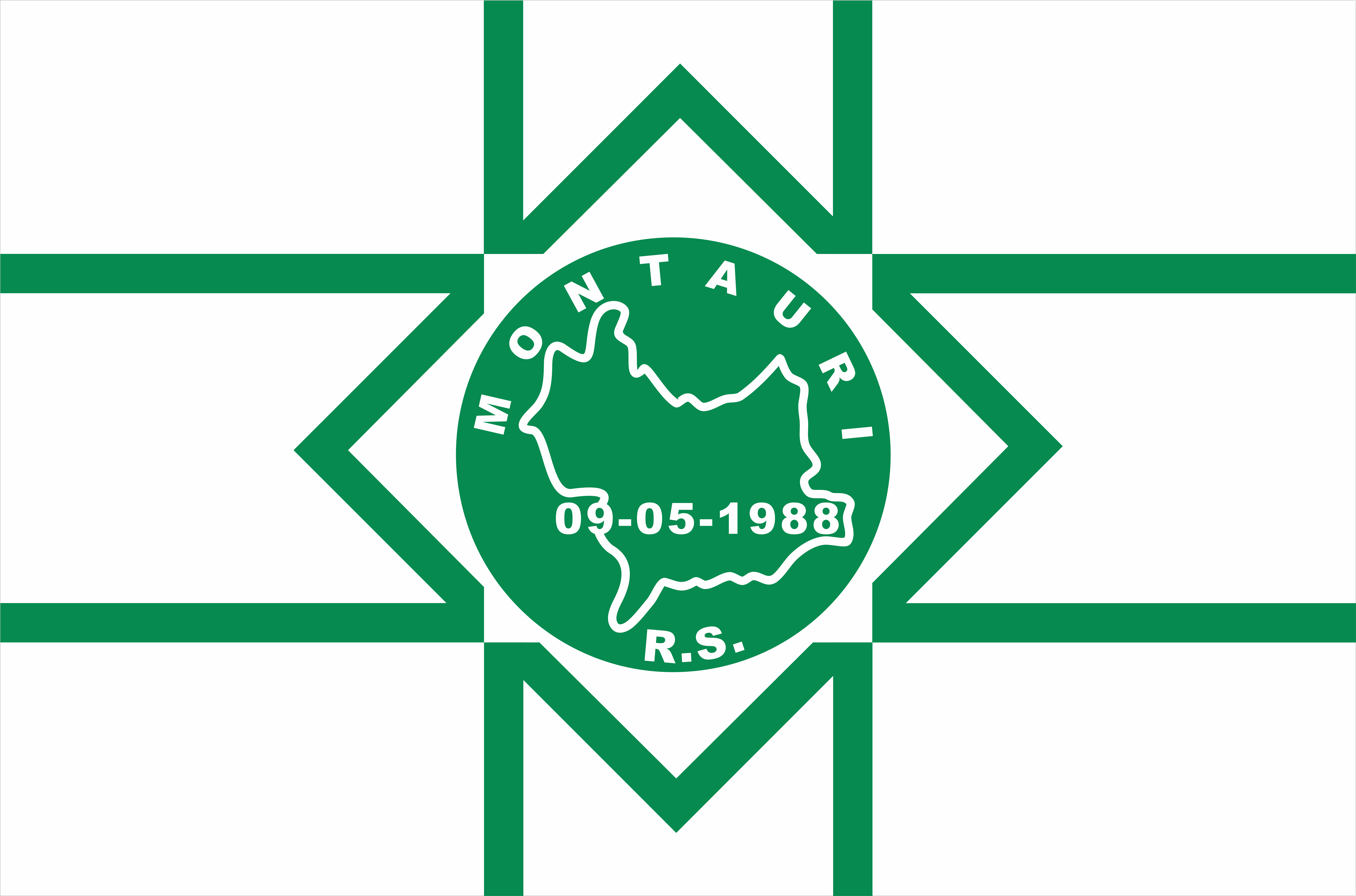
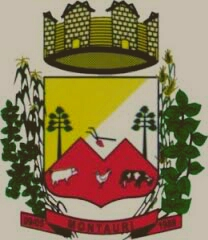
- Flag Coat of arms
- Interactive map of Montauri
- Country: Brazil
- Time zone: UTC−3 (BRT)

Montauri is a municipality in the state of Rio Grande do Sul, Brazil. As of 2022, it has a population of 1,499 people.

== Demographics ==
It is the only Brazilian town where the entire population reported to be White, according to the 2000 census. The town has its origin from a group of Italian immigrants who settled in the region in 1904.

== See also ==
- List of municipalities in Rio Grande do Sul
