= Bom Progresso =

Municipality in Rio Grande do Sul, Brazil

Coordinates: 27°32′38″S 53°51′57″W

- Municipality
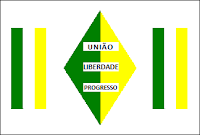
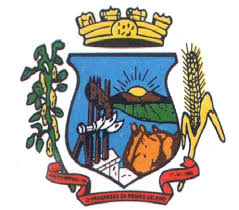
- Flag Coat of arms

- Location of Bom Progresso in Rio Grande do Sul
- Country: Brazil
- Region: South
- State: Rio Grande do Sul
- Mesoregion: Noroeste Rio-Grandense
- Microregion: Três Passos
- Founded: 20 March 1992

Government
  - Mayor: Armindo David Heinle (PP, 2021–2024)

Area
  - Total: 89.206 km^{2} (34.443 sq mi)

Population (2021)
  - Total: 1,858
  - Density: 20.83/km^{2} (53.94/sq mi)
- Demonym: Bom-Progressense
- Time zone: UTC−3 (BRT)
- Website: Official website

Bom Progresso is a municipality in the state of Rio Grande do Sul, Brazil. As of 2020, the estimated population was 1,899.

== See also ==
- List of municipalities in Rio Grande do Sul
