= Dois Lajeados =

Municipality in Rio Grande do Sul, Brazil

Coordinates: 28°59′S 51°51′W

- Municipality
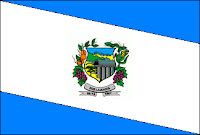
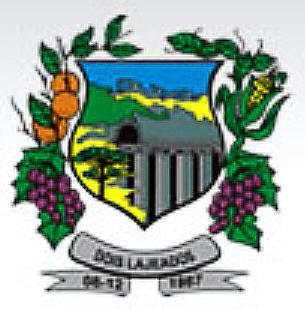
- Flag Coat of arms
- Interactive map of Dois Lajeados
- Country: Brazil
- Time zone: UTC−3 (BRT)

Dois Lajeados is a municipality in the state of Rio Grande do Sul, Brazil. As of 2020, the estimated population was 3,405.

== See also ==
- List of municipalities in Rio Grande do Sul
