= Santo Antônio do Palma =

Municipality of Rio Grande do Sul, Brazil

- Municipality
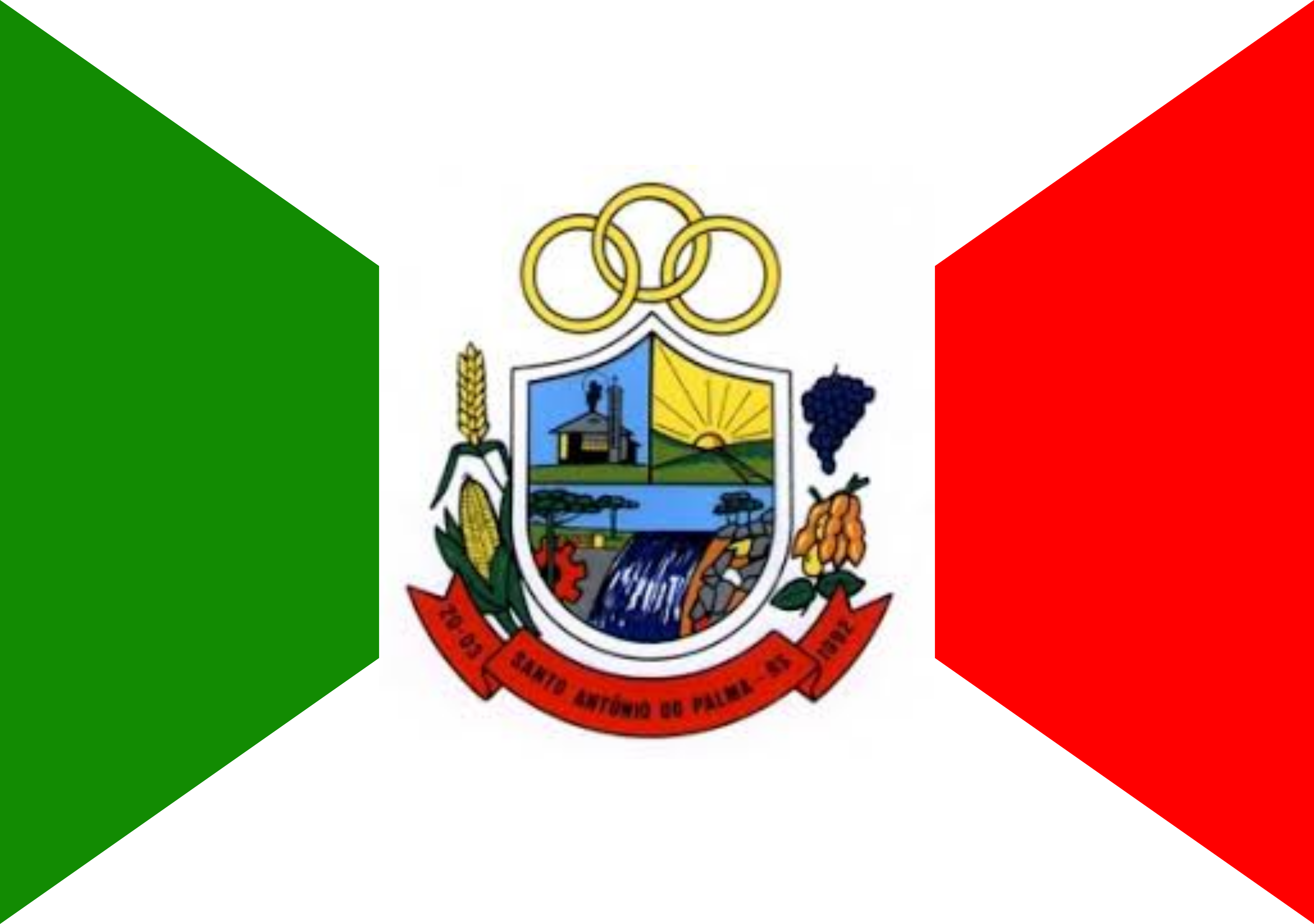
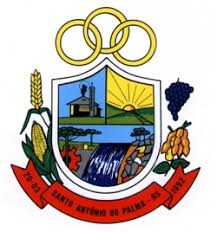
- Flag Coat of arms

- Location in Rio Grande do Sul state

- Location in Brazil
- Coordinates: 28°29′49″S 52°1′30″W
- Country: Brazil
- State: Rio Grande do Sul

Area
  - Total: 126.09 km^{2} (48.68 sq mi)

Population (2020)
  - Total: 2,123
  - Density: 16.84/km^{2} (43.61/sq mi)
- Time zone: UTC−3 (BRT)
- Website: www.stoantoniopalma.rs.gov.br

Santo Antônio do Palma (Portuguese meaning "Saint Anthony of the palm") is a municipality in the northern part of the state of Rio Grande do Sul, Brazil. The population is 2,123 (2020 est.) in an area of 126.09 km^{2}. Its elevation is 669 m.

== See also ==
- List of municipalities in Rio Grande do Sul
