= Nova Pádua =

Municipality in Rio Grande do Sul, Brazil

Coordinates: 29°02′S 51°19′W

- Municipality
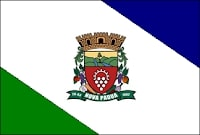
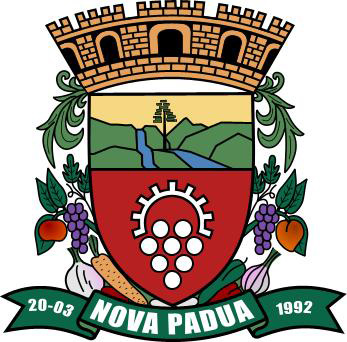
- Flag Coat of arms
- Interactive map of Nova Pádua
- Country: Brazil
- Time zone: UTC−3 (BRT)

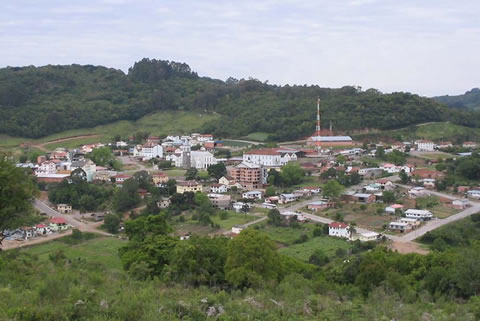

Nova Pádua is a municipality in the state of Rio Grande do Sul, Brazil. As of 2020, the estimated population was 2,558.

== See also ==
- List of municipalities in Rio Grande do Sul
