= Três de Maio =

Municipality in Rio Grande do Sul, Brazil

- Municipality
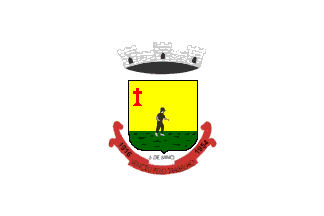
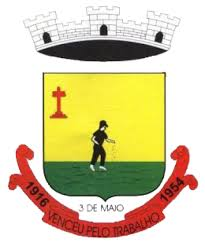
- Flag Coat of arms

- Location of Três de Maio in Rio Grande do Sul

- Location in Brazil
- Coordinates: 27.752602°S 54.243707°W
- Country: Brazil
- State: Rio Grande do Sul

Area
  - Total: 422.2 km^{2} (163.0 sq mi)

Population (2020)
  - Total: 23,876
- Time zone: UTC-3 (BRT)
  - Summer (DST): UTC-2 (BRST)

Três de Maio (English: "Third of May") is a Brazilian municipality in the state of Rio Grande do Sul. It is located at 27.752602°S 54.243707°W.

It has an area of 422,2 km^{2}. It is located 343 m over sea level. As of 2020 its population was estimated to be 23,876 inhabitants. Its climate is mild with temperatures of 20 °C (68 °F) to 35 °C (95 °F) in summer and 0 (32 °F) to 15 °C (59 °F) in winter.

== Notable residents ==
Supermodel Gisele Bündchen and Evlyn Eickoff were born in Três de Maio.

== See also ==
- List of municipalities in Rio Grande do Sul
- Riograndenser Hunsrückisch (regional German dialect)
