= Monte Belo do Sul =

Municipality of Rio Grande do Sul, Brazil

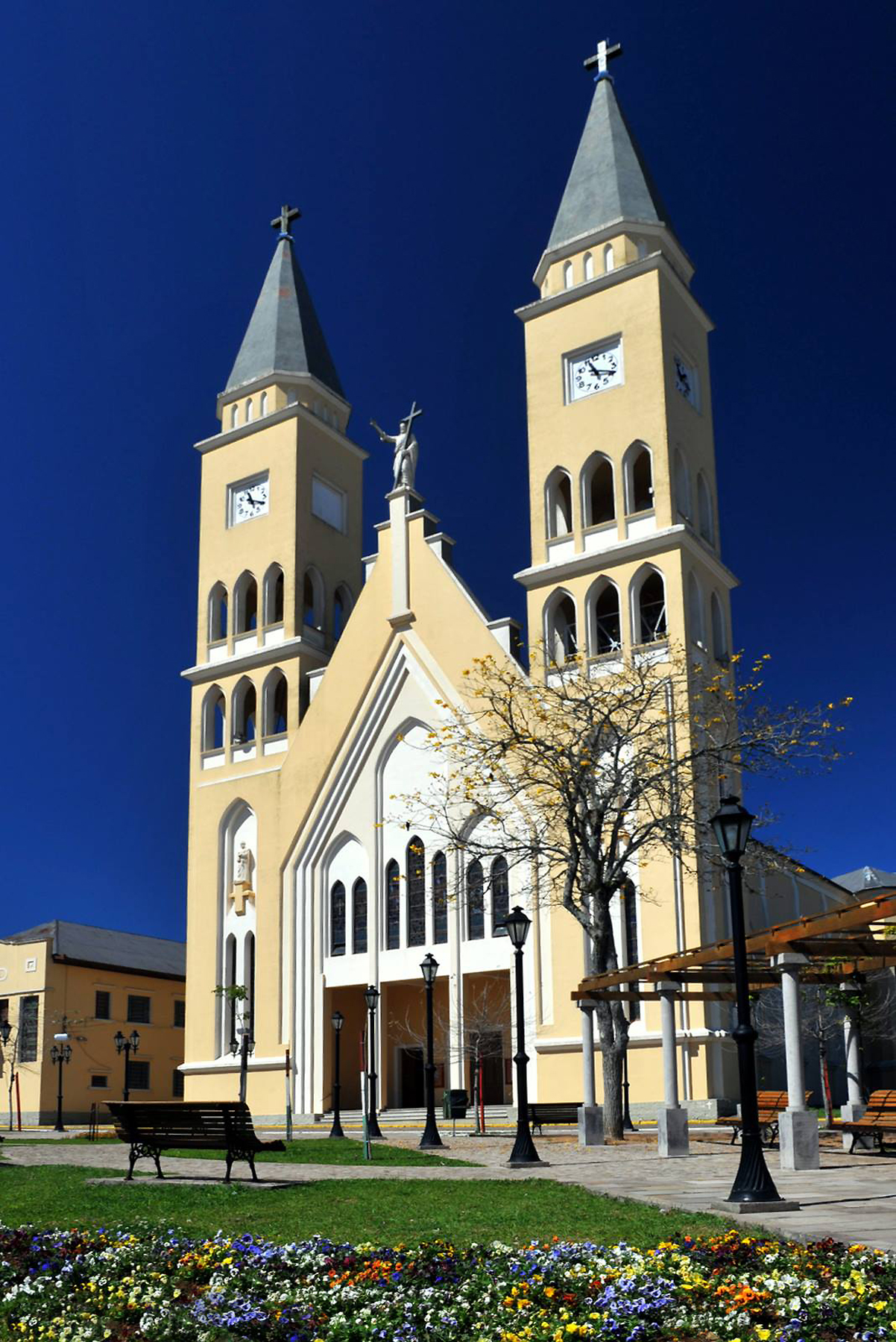
- Catholic church in Monte Belo do Sul

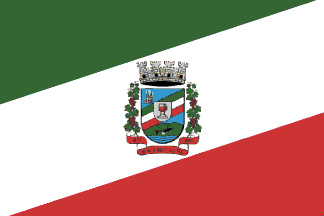
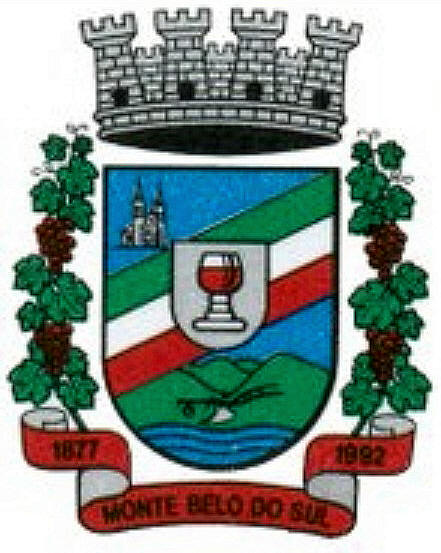
- Flag Coat of arms

- Monte Belo do Sul within the state of Rio Grande do Sul

- Location within Brazil Location within South America
- Coordinates: 29.16277°S 51.63194°W
- Country: Brazil
- Region: South
- State: Rio Grande do Sul

Area
  - Total: 69.726 km^{2} (26.921 sq mi)

Population
  - Estimate (2020): 2,530
- Demonym: Monte-belense

Monte Belo do Sul is a municipality in the state of Rio Grande do Sul, Brazil, in the Serra Gaúcha. As of 2020, the estimated population was 2,530, and the area of the municipality was 69.726 km².

== See also ==
- List of municipalities in Rio Grande do Sul
