= Fagundes Varela, Rio Grande do Sul =

Municipality in Rio Grande do Sul, Brazil

Coordinates: 28°53′S 51°42′W

- Municipality
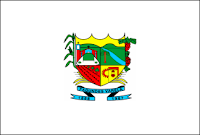
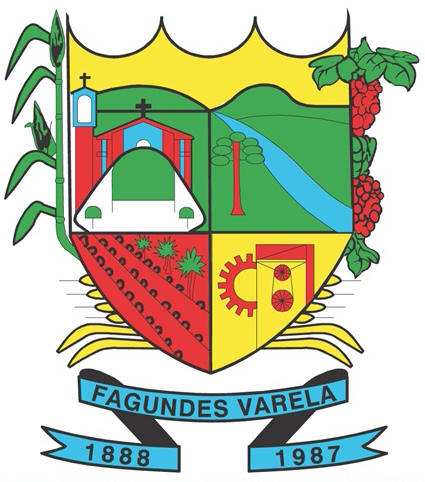
- Flag Coat of arms
- Interactive map of Fagundes Varela, Rio Grande do Sul
- Country: Brazil
- Time zone: UTC−3 (BRT)

Fagundes Varela is a municipality in the state of Rio Grande do Sul, Brazil. It lies at an elevation of 610 m, covers an area of 132.32 km², and has a population of 2,741 (2020 estimate).

== See also ==
- List of municipalities in Rio Grande do Sul
