= Serafina Corrêa =

Municipality in Rio Grande do Sul, Brazil

Coordinates: 28°42′43″S 51°56′06″W

- Municipality
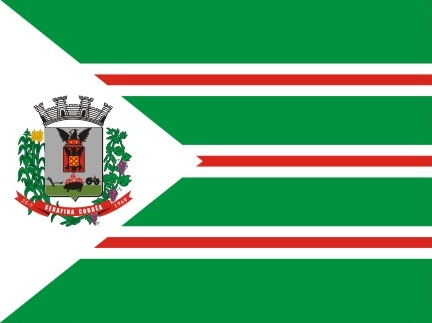
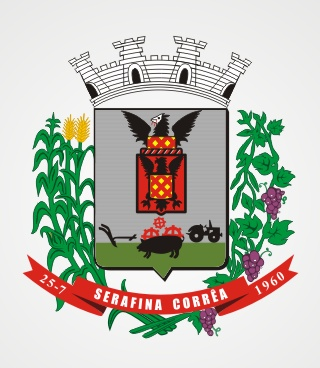
- Flag Coat of arms
- Interactive map of Serafina Corrêa
- Country: Brazil
- Time zone: UTC−3 (BRT)

Serafina Corrêa is a municipality in the state of Rio Grande do Sul, Brazil.

Serafina Corrêa was founded by Italian settlers at the end of the 19th century. In 2009, the city elected Talian, a Venetian-based dialect, as co-official language alongside Portuguese. As of 2020, the estimated population was 17,795.

== See also ==
- List of municipalities in Rio Grande do Sul
- Talian dialect
