= Guabiju =

Municipality in Rio Grande do Sul, Brazil

Coordinates: 28°32′27″S 51°41′24″W

- Municipality
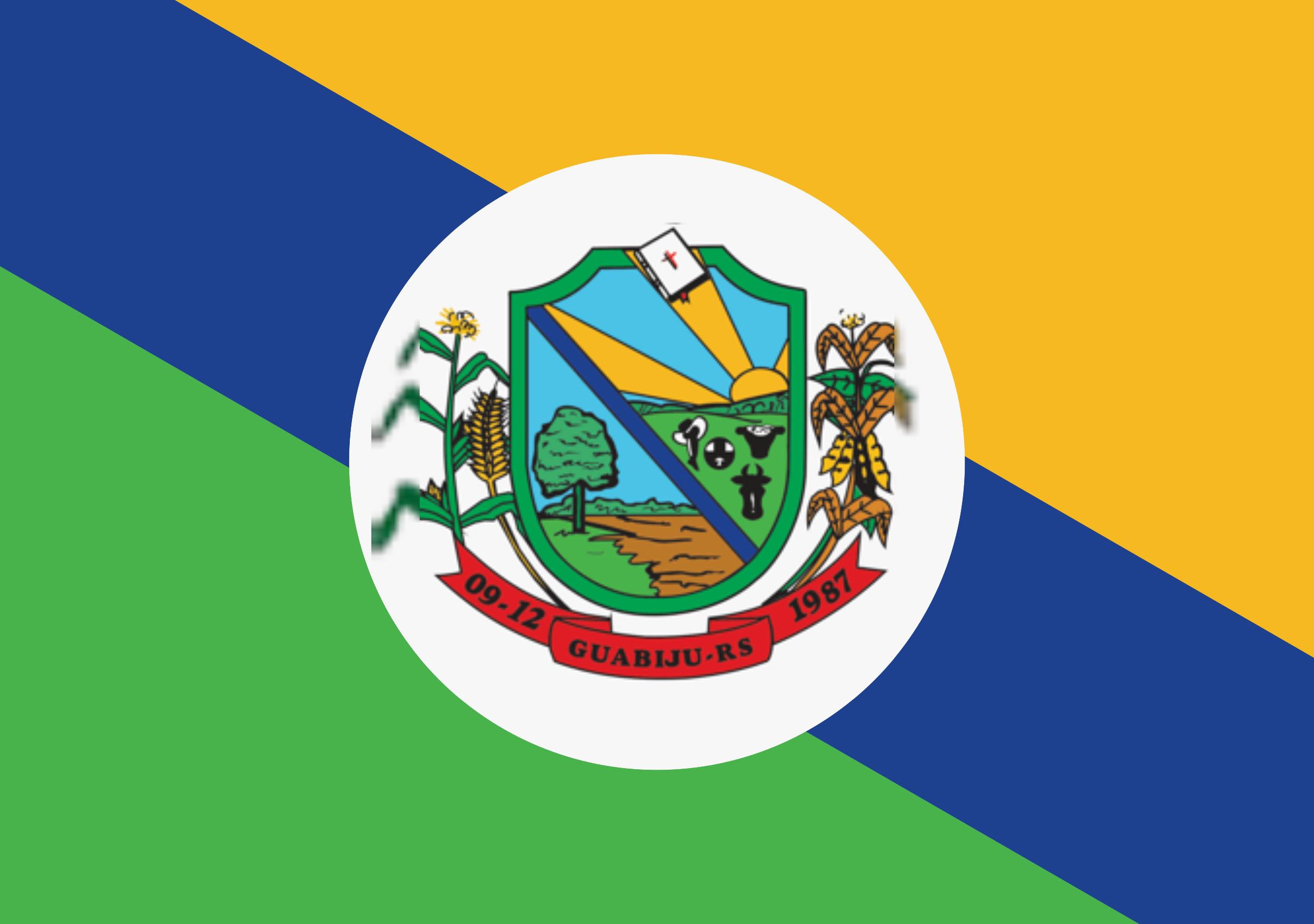
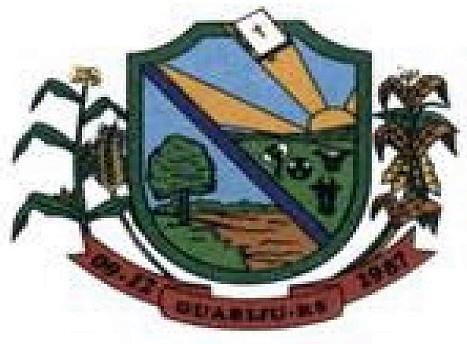
- Flag Coat of arms
- Interactive map of Guabiju
- Country: Brazil
- Time zone: UTC−3 (BRT)

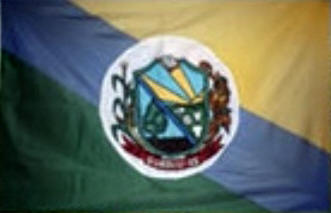
Flag of Guabiju - RS - Brazil.

Guabiju is a municipality in the state of Rio Grande do Sul, Brazil. As of 2020, the estimated population was 1,490.

== See also ==
- List of municipalities in Rio Grande do Sul
