= Protásio Alves =

Municipality in Rio Grande do Sul, Brazil

- Municipality
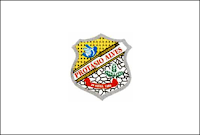
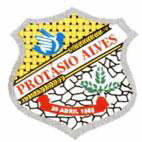
- Flag Coat of arms
- Interactive map of Protásio Alves
- Country: Brazil
- Time zone: UTC−3 (BRT)

Protásio Alves
- Municipality
- Município de Protásio Alves
- Interactive map of Protásio Alves
- Coordinates: 28°46′S 51°29′W
- Country: Brazil
- State: Rio Grande do Sul

Population (2020)
  - Total: 1,938

Protásio Alves is a municipality in the state of Rio Grande do Sul, Brazil. As of 2020, the estimated population was 1,938.

== See also ==
- List of municipalities in Rio Grande do Sul
