= Nova Araçá =

Municipality in the state Rio Grande do Sul, Brazil

Coordinates: 28°40′S 51°45′W

- Municipality
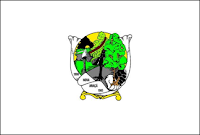
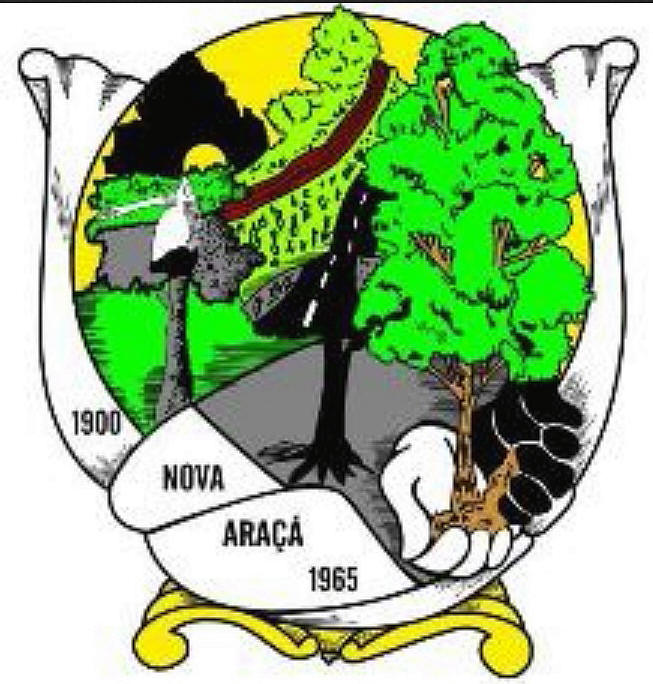
- Flag Coat of arms
- Interactive map of Nova Araçá
- Country: Brazil
- Time zone: UTC−3 (BRT)

Nova Araçá is a municipality in the state of Rio Grande do Sul, Brazil. As of 2020, the estimated population was 4,826.

== See also ==
- List of municipalities in Rio Grande do Sul
