= Campos de Cima da Serra =

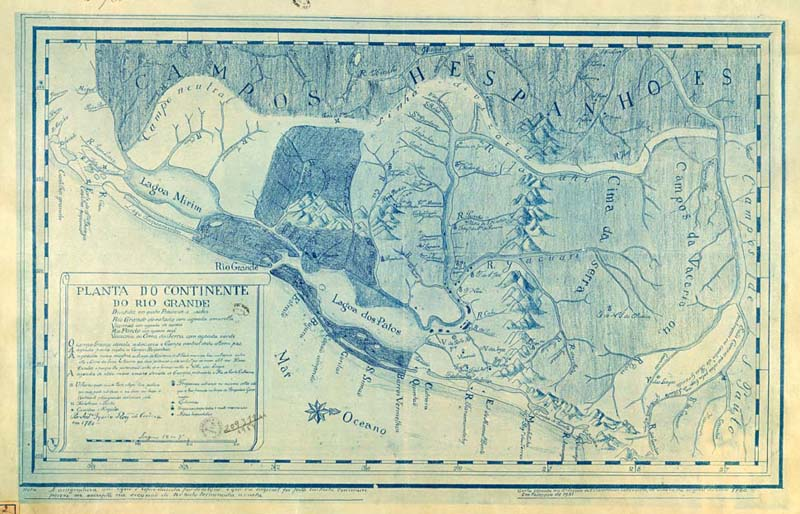
Map of the Rio Grande's Continent in 1780

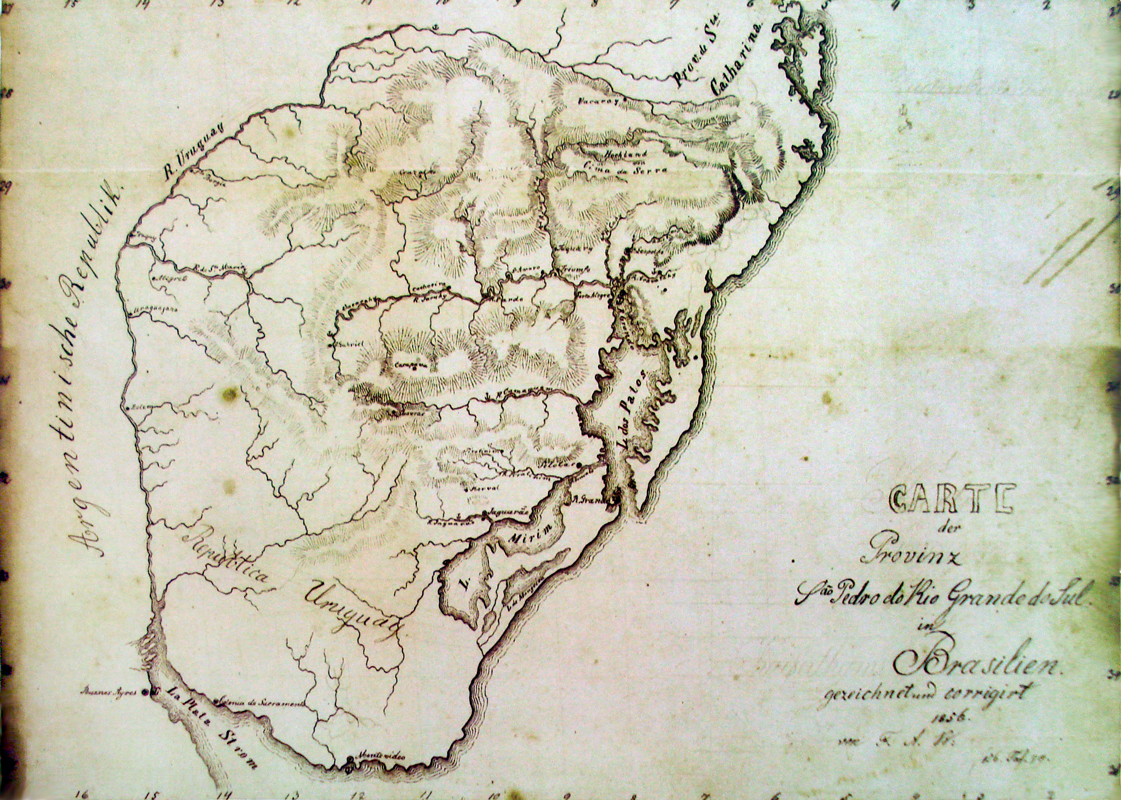
Map of the Province of São Pedro in 1852

Campos de Cima da Serra, also known as Campos de Vacaria, is a Brazilian physiographic region in the Rio Grande do Sul, located in the far northeast of the state, bordering Santa Catarina. It comprises the main municipalities of Bom Jesus, Cambará do Sul, Campestre da Serra, Capão Bonito do Sul, Esmeralda, Ipê, Jaquirana, Lagoa Vermelha, Monte Alegre dos Campos, Muitos Capões, Pinhal da Serra, São Francisco de Paula, São José dos Ausentes, and Vacaria. Its total area is 21,033 square kilometers. It is located at altitudes ranging from 900 meters in the west to 1,200 meters in the Aparados da Serra. The region is characterized by gently rolling terrain deeply cut by several rivers and consists of an elevated plain with basaltic soil that slopes to the west. The predominant vegetation is grasslands with occasional stands of Araucaria trees.

An extensive strip of pine forests lies along the Aparados da Serra. In the western part, there are large pine forests interspersed with the grasslands. In the Pelotas River valley, there is a direct connection between the broadleaf forest (which continues up the Uruguai River to the Missões) and its equivalent formation on the eastern edge of the Planalto Médio, connecting with the Atlantic forests of Santa Catarina.

== Vegetation ==
The Grassland Biome, with gallery forests, accounts for 47.1% of the vegetation. The Parkland Biome with gallery forests contributes 12.2%. Both are known as the Campos de Cima da Serra. The Mixed Ombrophilous Forestrepresents 37.5% of the vegetation; the Deciduous Seasonal Forest contributes 3.1%, and the Semi-deciduous Seasonal Forest contributes 0.2%.

== Hydrography ==
The region's hydrography consists of two river basins: 52% in the Taquari-Antas River Basin and 48% in the Apuaê-Inhandava River Basin. It is located in an area of headwaters for important rivers, such as the Taquari-Antas River and the Pelotas River, a tributary of the Uruguai River.

== See also ==
- Fisiografia do Rio Grande do Sul
