= Aracuri-Esmeralda Ecological Station =

Protected area in Brazil

- Estação Ecológica de Aracuri-Esmeralda
- IUCN category Ia (strict nature reserve)
- Location within Brazil
- Nearest city: Vacaria, Rio Grande do Sul
- Coordinates: 28.318°S 51.179°W
- Area: 277 hectares (680 acres)
- Designation: Ecological station
- Created: 2 June 1981

Aracuri-Esmeralda Ecological Station (Portuguese: Estação Ecológica de Aracuri-Esmeralda) is an ecological station in the state of Rio Grande do Sul, Brazil. It is in the Atlantic Forest biome.

== Location ==
The ecological station in the Atlantic Forest biome, which covers 277 hectares (680 acres), was created on 2 June 1981 by Federal Decree No. 86 061. It is administered by the Chico Mendes Institute for Biodiversity Conservation. It is located in the municipality of Muitos Capões in the state of Rio Grande do Sul.

== Environment ==
Annual rainfall is 1,900 millimetres (75 in). Temperatures range from 1 to 32 °C (34 to 90 °F) with an average of 15 °C (59 °F). Altitude ranges from 900 to 930 metres (2,950 to 3,050 ft). The land surface is broken, with steep slopes.

The ESEC has a small sample of the vegetation of the region. The tall Araucaria angustifolia is found here, as is the Baccharis articulata bush, which covers most of the area. There are small patches of meadows and some marshes. Endangered plant species include Alstroemeria isabellana, Alternanthera micrantha, Oreopanax fulvum, Butia eriosphata, Trichocline catharinensis, Weinmannia paulliniifolia, Dorstenia brasiliensis, Hexachlamys humilis, Fuchsia regia, Agrostis lenis, Drimys brasiliensis, Dicksonia sellowiana and Araucaria angustifólia.

Migratory bird species include plumbeous kite (Ictinia plumbea), sharp-shinned hawk (Accipiter striatus), pale-vented pigeon (Columba cayennensis), dark-billed cuckoo (Coccyzus melacoryphus), dark-billed cuckoo (Nctibius griseus), short-tailed nighthawk (Lurocalis semitorquatus), rufous nightjar (Caprimulgus rufus), planalto tyrannulet (phyllomyias fasciatus), small-billed elaenia (Elaenia parvirostris), olivaceous elaenia (Elaenia mesoleuca), fulvous-crowned scrub tyrant (Euscarthmus meloryphus), bran-colored flycatcher (Myiophobus fasciatus), Euler's flycatcher (Lathrotriccus euleri), Swainson's flycatcher (Myiarchus swainsoni), boat-billed flycatcher (Megarynchus pitangua), streaked flycatcher (Myiodynastes maculatus), tropical kingbird (Tyrannus melancholicus), fork-tailed flycatcher (Tyrannus savana), white-winged becard (Pachyramphus polychopterus), grey-breasted martin (Progne chalybea), brown-chested martin (Progne tapera), eastern slaty thrush (Turdus subalaris), swallow tanager (Tersina viridis) and red-eyed vireo (Vireo olivaceus).

== Conservation ==
The Ecological Station is a "strict nature reserve" under IUCN protected area category Ia. The purpose is to preserve the environment and support scientific research. Protected species include the red-spectacled amazon (Amazona pretrei).

== Sources ==
- Esec de Aracuri-Esmeralda (in Portuguese), Chico Mendes Institute for Biodiversity Conservation
- "Estação Ecológica de Aracuri-Esmeralda", Cadastro Nacional de Unidades de Conservação
