= Slaty thrush =

The bird formerly known as slaty thrush has been split into two species:

- Andean slaty thrush, Turdus nigriceps
- Blacksmith thrush, Turdus subalaris
