= Vacaria (disambiguation) =

Vacaria is a municipality in the Brazilian state of Rio Grande do Sul.

Vacaria may also refer to:

- Vacaria Airport, airport serving Vacaria, Brazil
- Roman Catholic Diocese of Vacaria, diocese located in Vacaria, Brazil
- Vacaria River, river in Mato Grosso do Sul, Brazil
- Vacaria River (Minas Gerais), river in Minas Gerais, Brazil
- Vacaria (footballer) (born 1994), Brazilian footballer

== See also ==
- Văcăria River (disambiguation)
- Vacarius (1120-1200), Italian authority on civil and Canon law
- Vaccaria, monotypic genus of flowering plants
