= Flores da Cunha =

Municipality of Rio Grande do Sul, Brazil

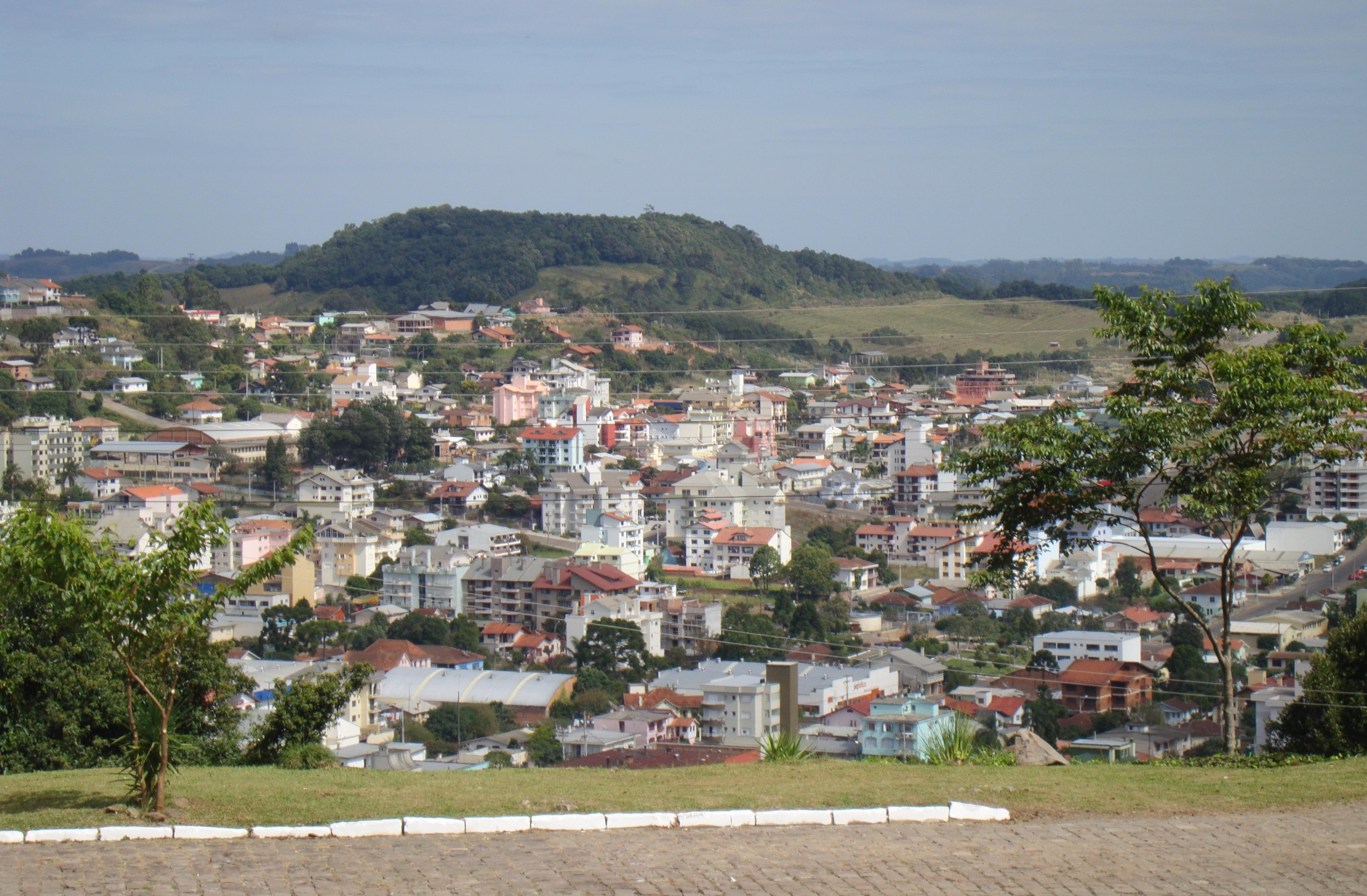

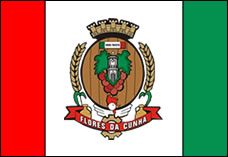
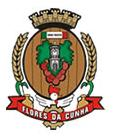
- Flag Coat of arms
- Nickname: Terra do Galo (The land of the Rooster)
- Location in Brazil
- Coordinates: 29°01′50″S 51°11′00″W
- Country: Brazil
- Region: South
- State: State of Rio Grande do Sul
- Founded: May 17, 1924

Government
  - Mayor: Lidio Scortegagna (PMDB)

Area
  - Total: 272,662 km^{2} (105,275 sq mi)
- Elevation: 756 m (2,480 ft)

Population (2020)
  - Total: 31,063
  - Density: 99.2/km^{2} (257/sq mi)
- Time zone: UTC−3 (BRT)
- Postal code: 95270-000
- Website: Flores da Cunha City Hall

Location of Flores da Cunha in the state of Rio Grande do Sul

Flores da Cunha is a municipality in the state of Rio Grande do Sul, Brazil. It is the largest producer of wines inside Brazil. The Venetian language in its Brazilian form Talian is co-official with Portuguese in Flores da Cunha.

== History ==
The Serra Gaúcha, where the municipality is located, was inhabited by caingangue indigenous people since time immemorial. The territory that makes up the current municipality of Flores da Cunha began to be occupied by immigrants, especially from Northern Italy, starting in 1876.

Between 1876 and 1877, some immigrant families settled in the current territory of the municipality. Among them, we can highlight the Soldatelli, Borghetti, Mambrini, Letti, Piardi, Grizza, Dall Conte, Carletti, Rossetto, Curra, Oldra, and others. The largest wave of Italian colonizers, however, settled between 1878 and 1892, the time when the primitive village of São Pedro was founded, and later, also São José. Only in the late 1880s were the two villages reunified, forming the village of Nova Trento. On December 12, 1882, the first chaplain of the locality, Fr. Luigi Centin, was appointed.

In 1890, when the old Colônia Caxias was elevated to the status of a municipality, to which Nova Trento belonged, the village became the seat of the 2nd District. However, documents state that shortly thereafter, still in the early years of the 20th century, a committee formed by local community leaders, dissatisfied with the little attention received from the mother municipality, fought insistently for the district's emancipation. The conquest was only achieved on May 17, 1924. The new municipality, installed the following week, on May 24, included the territories belonging to Nova Pádua, until then the 4th District of Caxias and emancipated from Flores da Cunha in 1992, Otávio Rocha, and Mato Perso, the current 3rd and 4th Districts of Flores da Cunha.

District created under the name Nova Trento, by Act No. 5, of 07-03-1890, and by Municipal Act No. 1, of 05-26-1924, subordinated to the municipality of Caxias (now Caxias do Sul).

Elevated to the category of municipality under the name Nova Trento, by Municipal Decree No. 3,320, of 05-17-1924. By Decree No. 12, of 12-21-1935, it was renamed Flores da Cunha.

The municipality consists of three districts: Flores da Cunha, Mato Perso, and Otávio Rocha.

In 2015, the Talian language was co-officialized in Flores da Cunha.

== Geography ==
=== Climate ===
Because of the Altitude of 756 meters above the sea level, The Climate of Flores da Cunha is Oceanic Climate type Cfb. With warm (not hot) to cool summers with some few experiences of snowfall between July and August.

Flores da Cunha

Climate chart (precipitation, max. and min. temperature)
J	F	M	A	M	J	J	A	S	O	N	D
146 26 17	142 25 17	192 25 16	133 22 13	139 20 11	152 17 9	137 18 9	127 19 10	166 20 11	153 22 12	109 25 14	131 27 16
- █ Average max. and min. temperatures in °C
- █ Precipitation totals in mm
- Source: Somar Metereologia
Imperial conversion
J	F	M	A	M	J	J	A	S	O	N	D
5.7 79 63	5.6 78 63	7.6 78 61	5.2 72 56	5.5 67 51	6 63 48	5.4 64 48	5 65 49	6.5 68 51	6 72 54	4.3 76 57	5.2 80 61
- █ Average max. and min. temperatures in °F
- █ Precipitation totals in inches

== Gallery ==
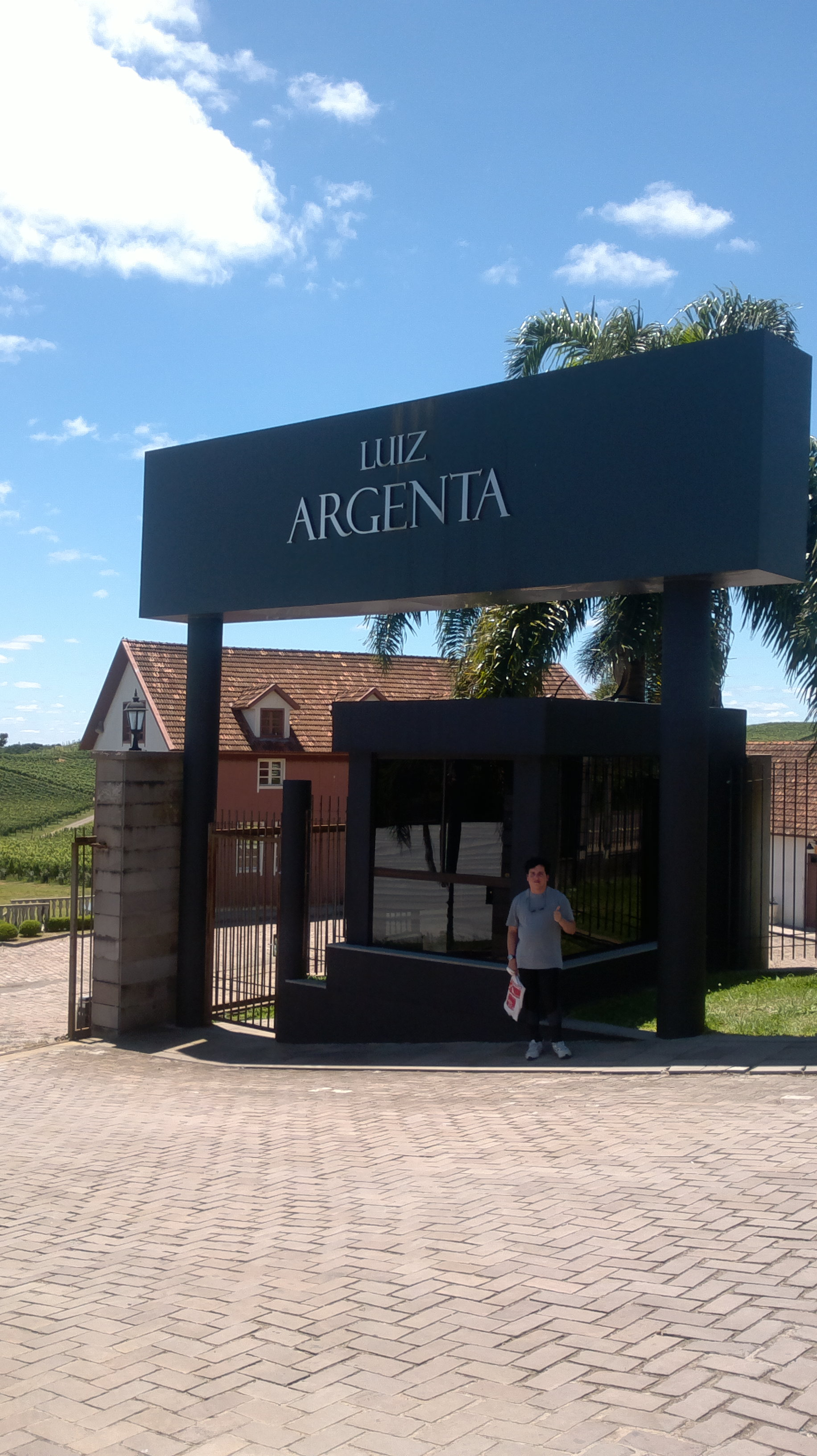
Luiz Argenta Winery, the largest winery in the City

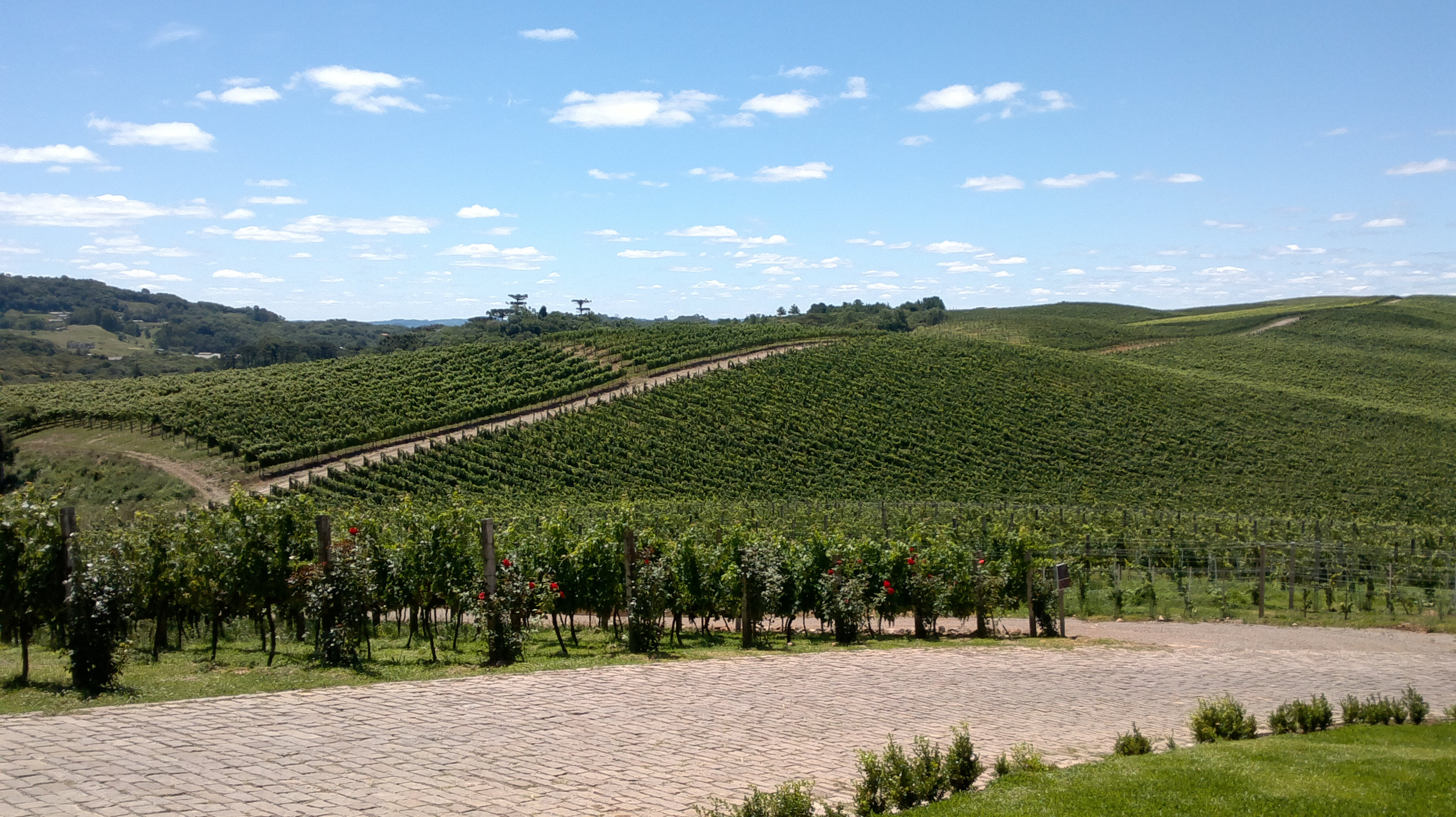
Luiz Argenta

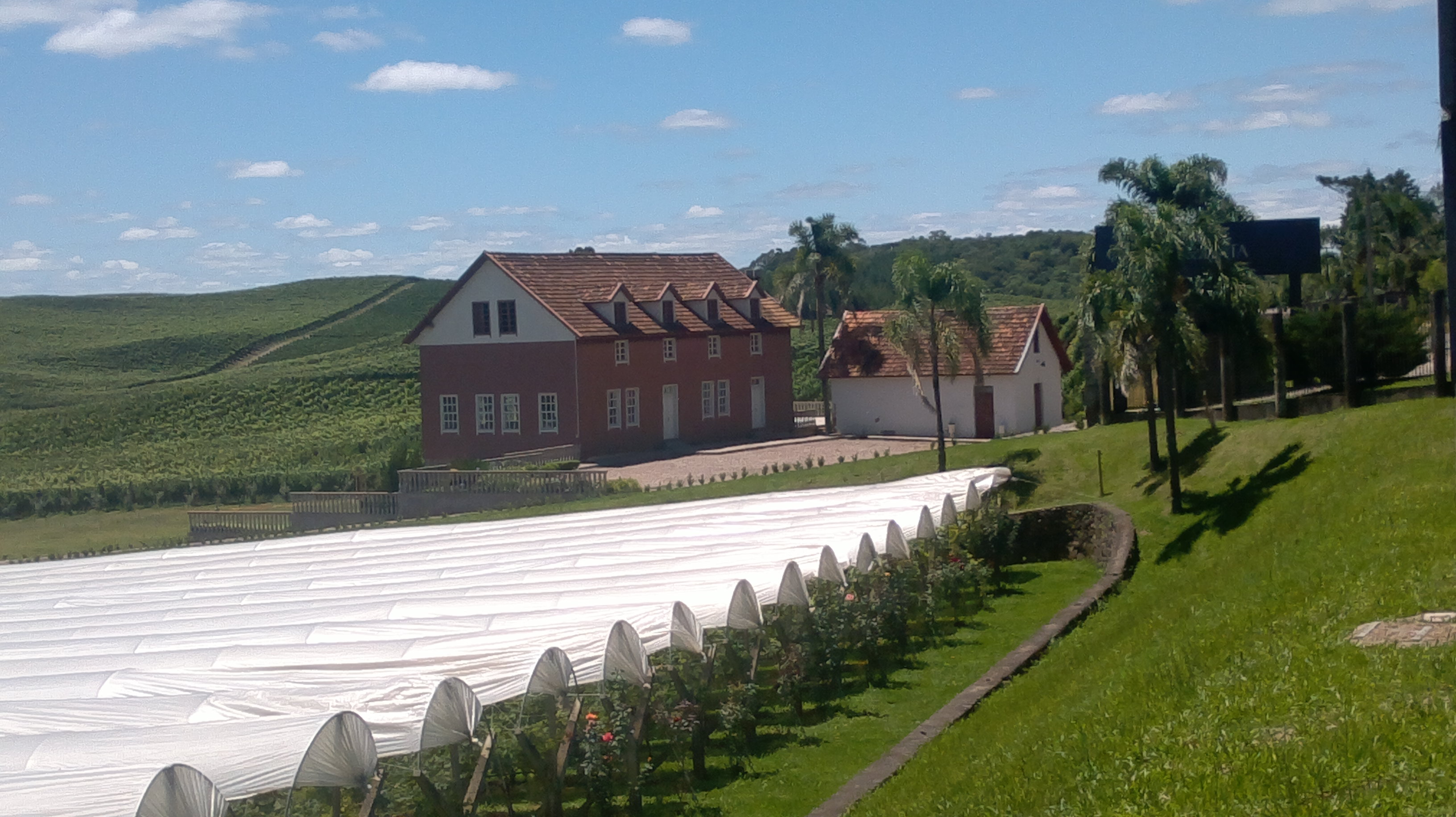
Luiz Argenta

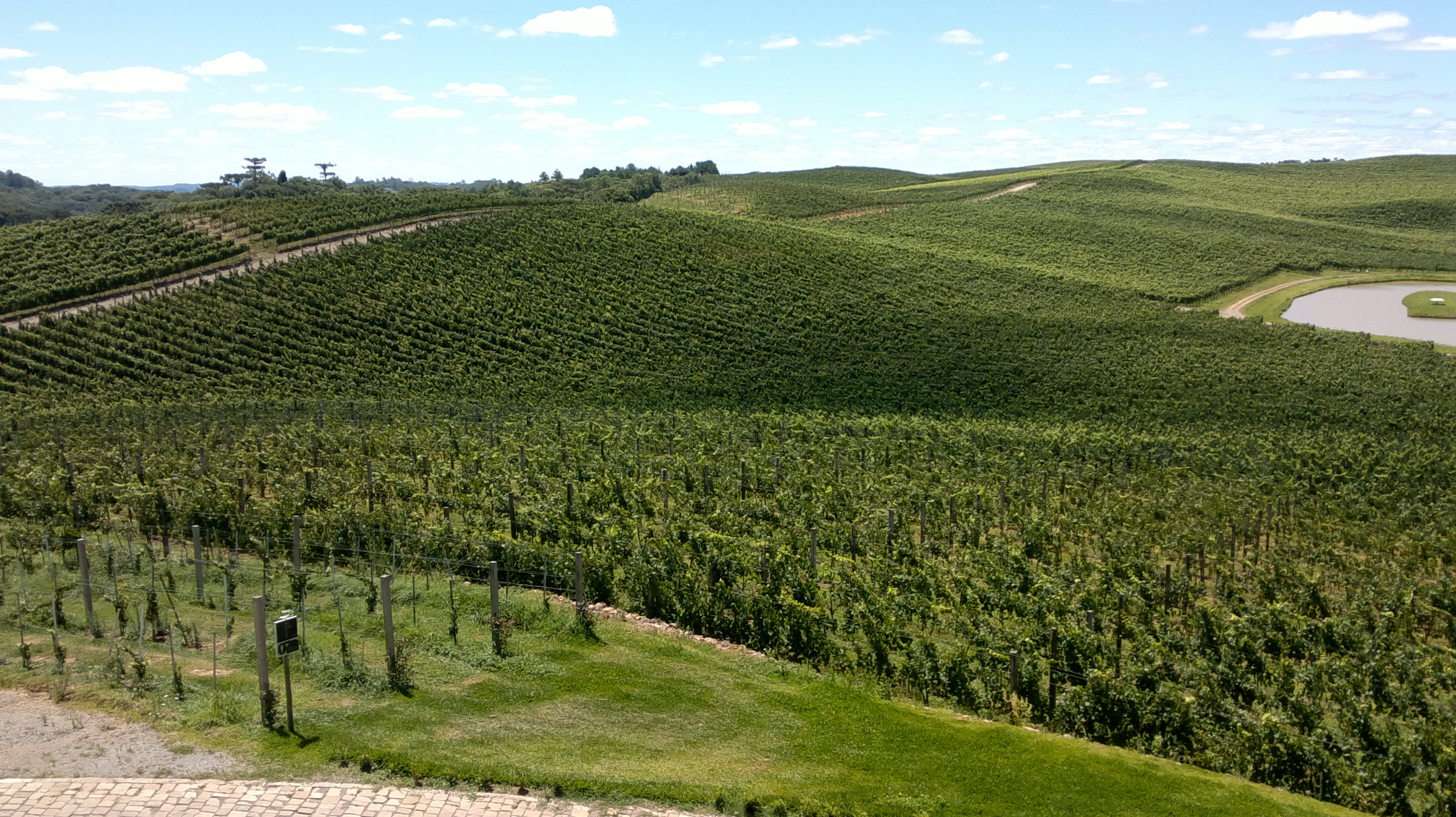
Luiz Argenta

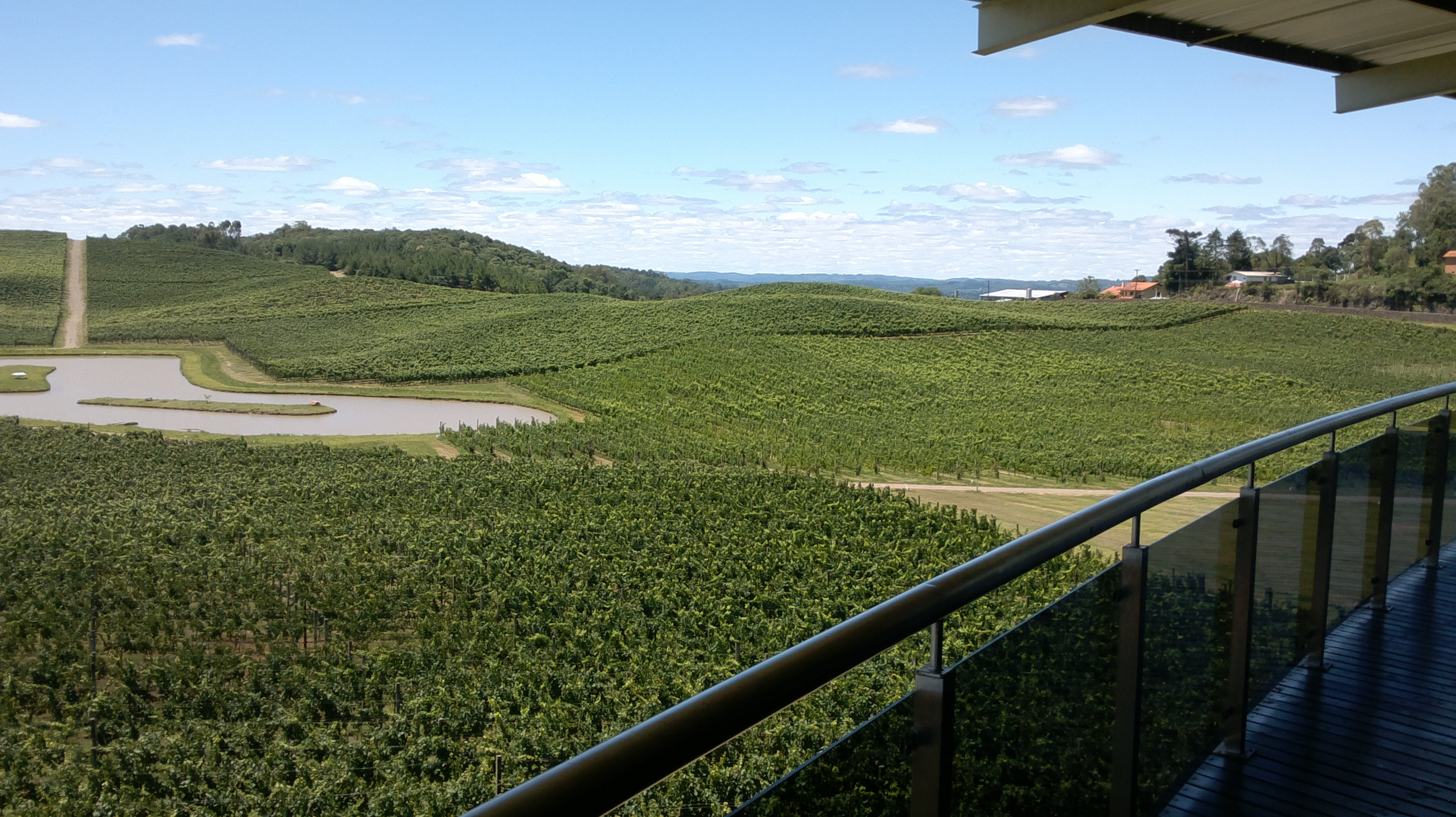
Luiz Argenta

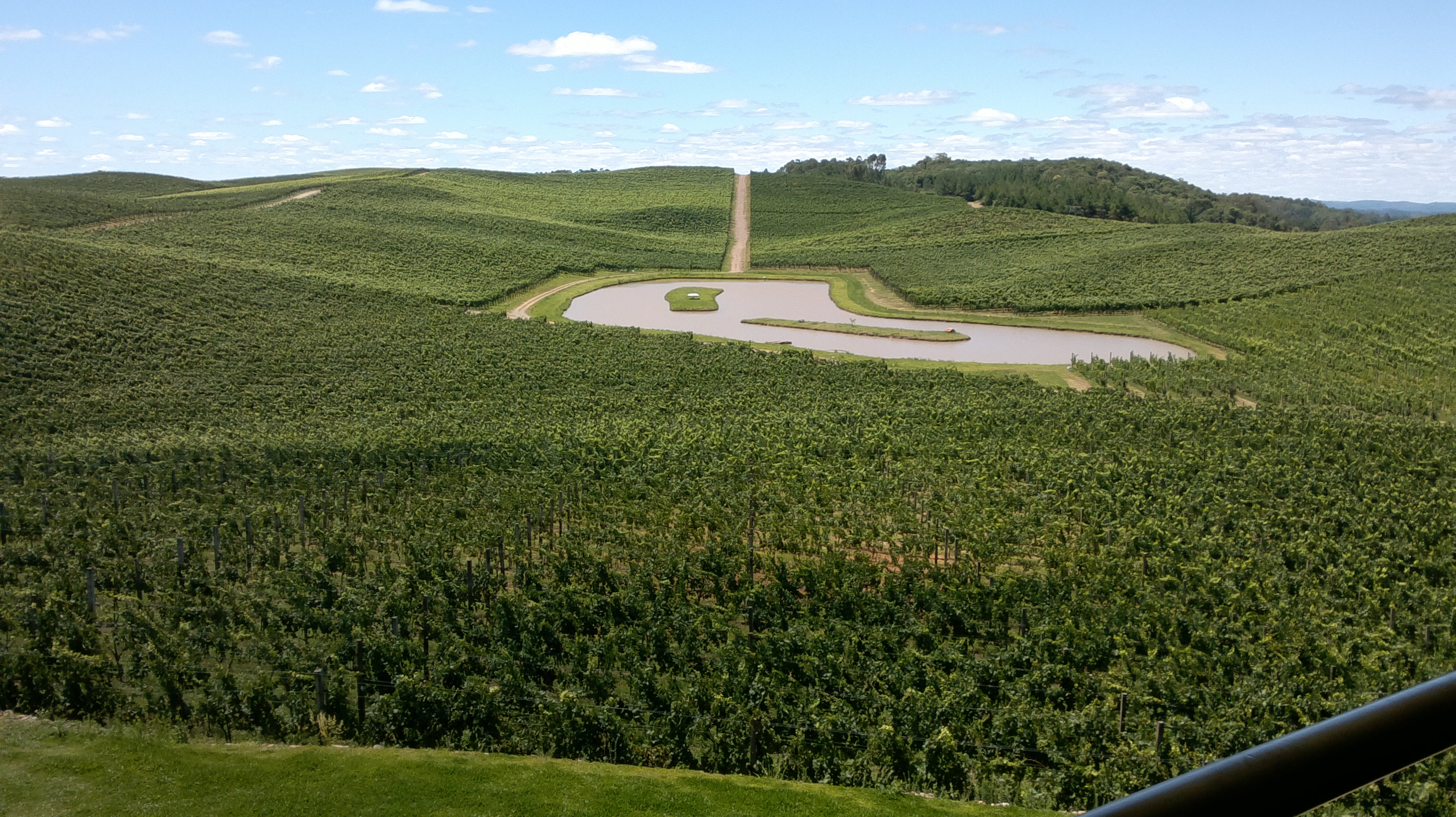
Luiz Argenta

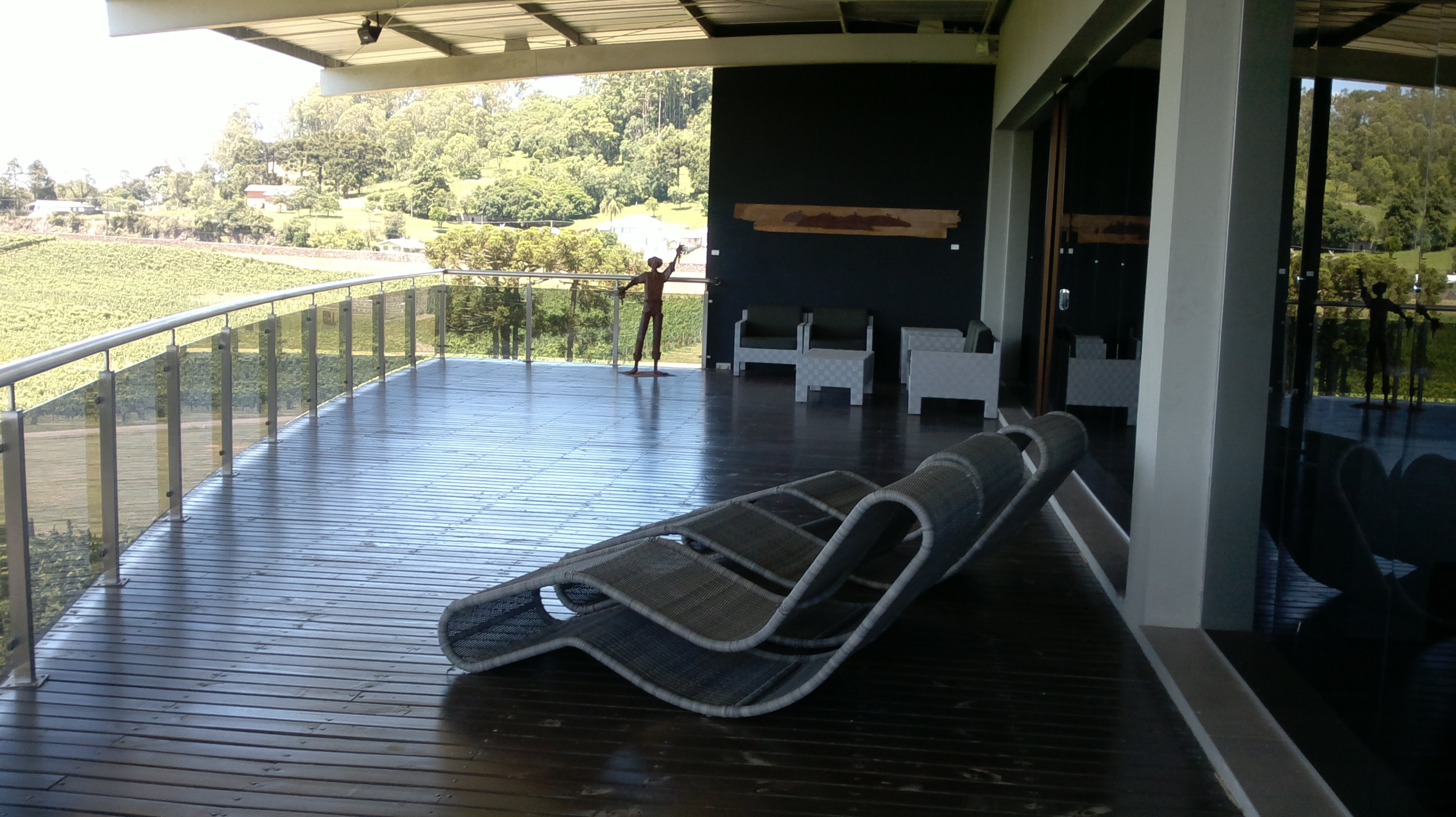
Luiz Argenta

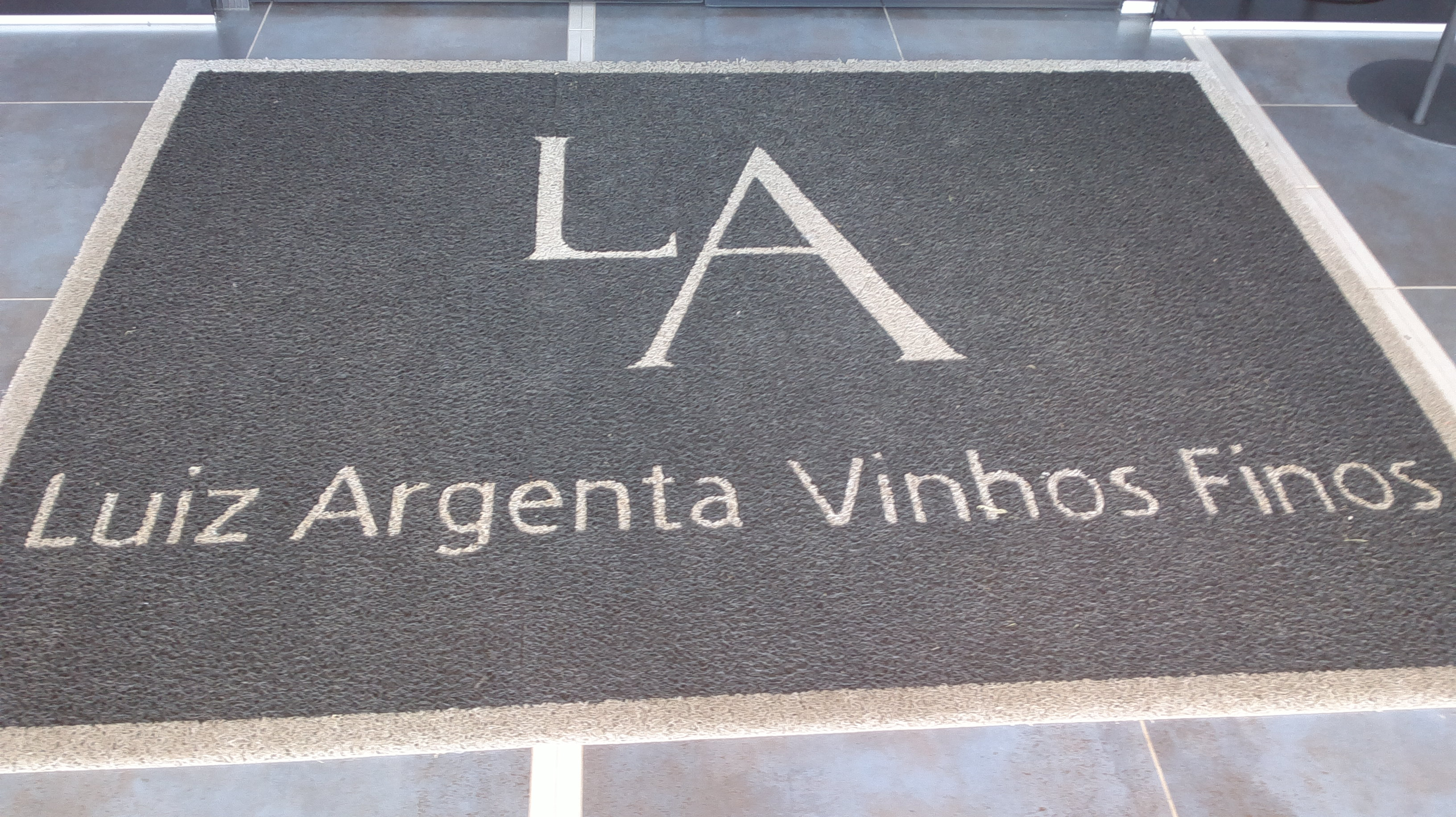
Luiz Argenta

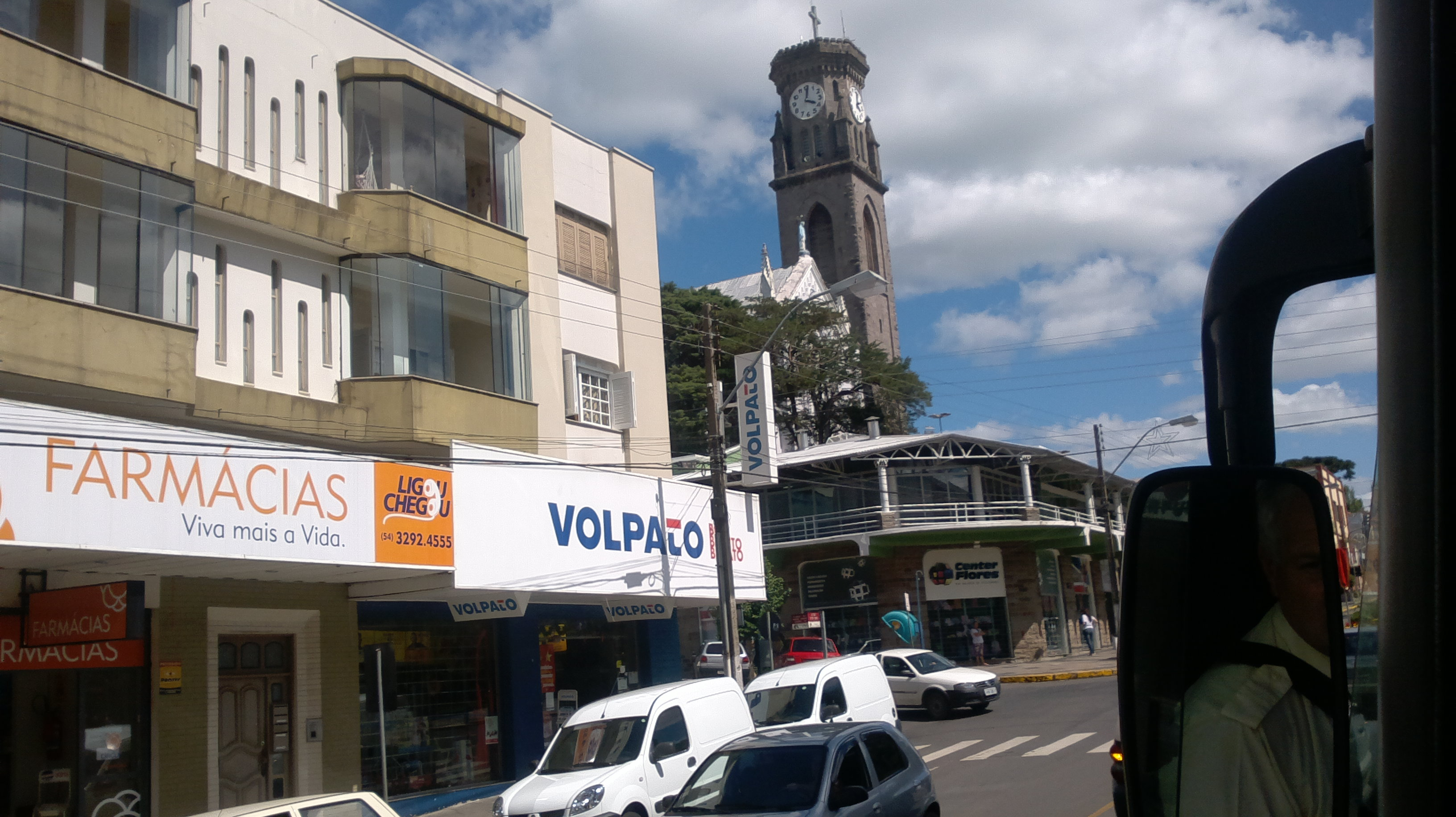
Flores da Cunha Downtown

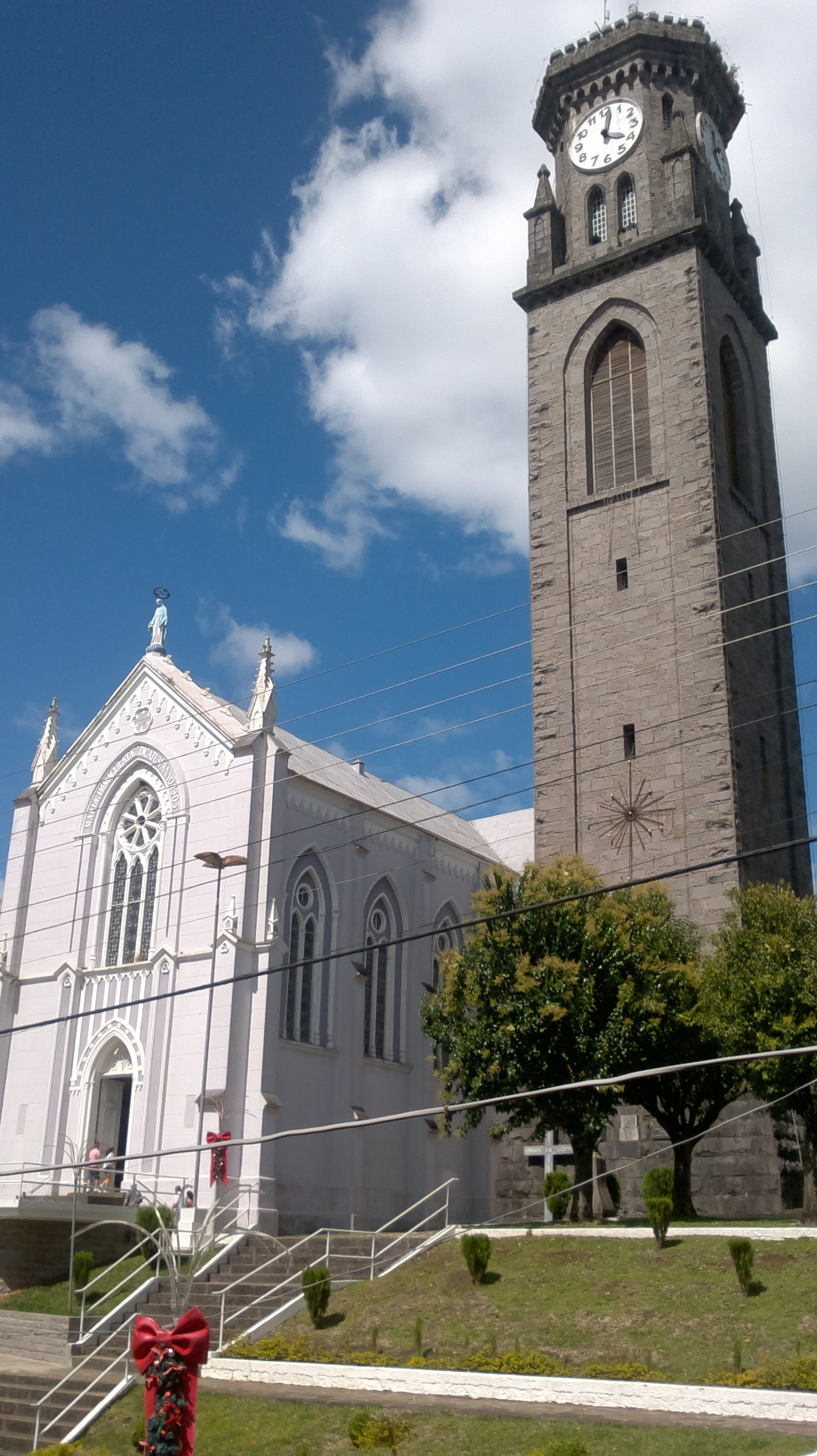
A church at Flores da Cunha Town

== See also ==
- List of municipalities in Rio Grande do Sul
- Talian
- Grape and Wine Region
- Campos de Cima da Serra
