= Muitos Capões =

Municipality in Rio Grande do Sul, Brazil

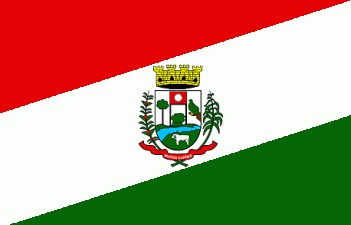
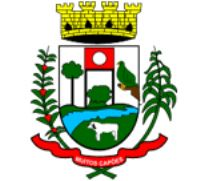
- Flag Coat of arms

- Location in Brazil
- Coordinates: 28°18′55″S 51°11′00″W
- Country: Brazil
- Region: South
- State: Rio Grande do Sul
- Founded: 28 December 1995

Government
  - Mayor: Luciano Debona (PL)

Area
  - Total: 1,193.717 km^{2} (460.897 sq mi)
- Lowest elevation: 933 m (3,061 ft)

Population (2022)
  - Total: 3,184
  - Density: 2.667/km^{2} (6.908/sq mi)
- Demonym: Capoense
- Time zone: UTC-3 (UTC-3)
  - Summer (DST): Does not observe DST
- Postal Code: 95230-000
- Area code: +55 54
- HDI (2010): 0.702– high (UNDP)
- Website: www.muitoscapoes.rs.gov.br

Muitos Capões is a municipality in the state of Rio Grande do Sul, Brazil. It was raised to municipality status in 1992, the area being taken out of the municipalities of Vacaria, Lagoa Vermelha and Esmeralda. As of 2020, the estimated population was 3,173.

It contains the Aracuri-Esmeralda Ecological Station.

== See also ==
- List of municipalities in Rio Grande do Sul
