= Pinhal da Serra =

Municipality of Rio Grande do Sul, Brazil

- Municipality
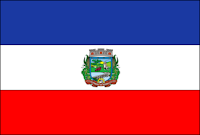
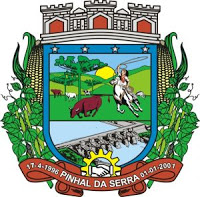
- Flag Coat of arms

- Location in Brazil
- Coordinates: 25°52′26″S 51°10′12″W
- Country: Brazil
- Region: Southern
- State: Rio Grande do Sul
- Mesoregion: Nordeste Rio-Grandense

Population (2020)
  - Total: 1,918
- Time zone: UTC−3 (BRT)

Pinhal da Serra is a municipality in the state of Rio Grande do Sul in the Southern Region of Brazil. It was raised to municipality status in 1996, the area being taken out of the municipality of Esmeralda.

== See also ==
- List of municipalities in Rio Grande do Sul
