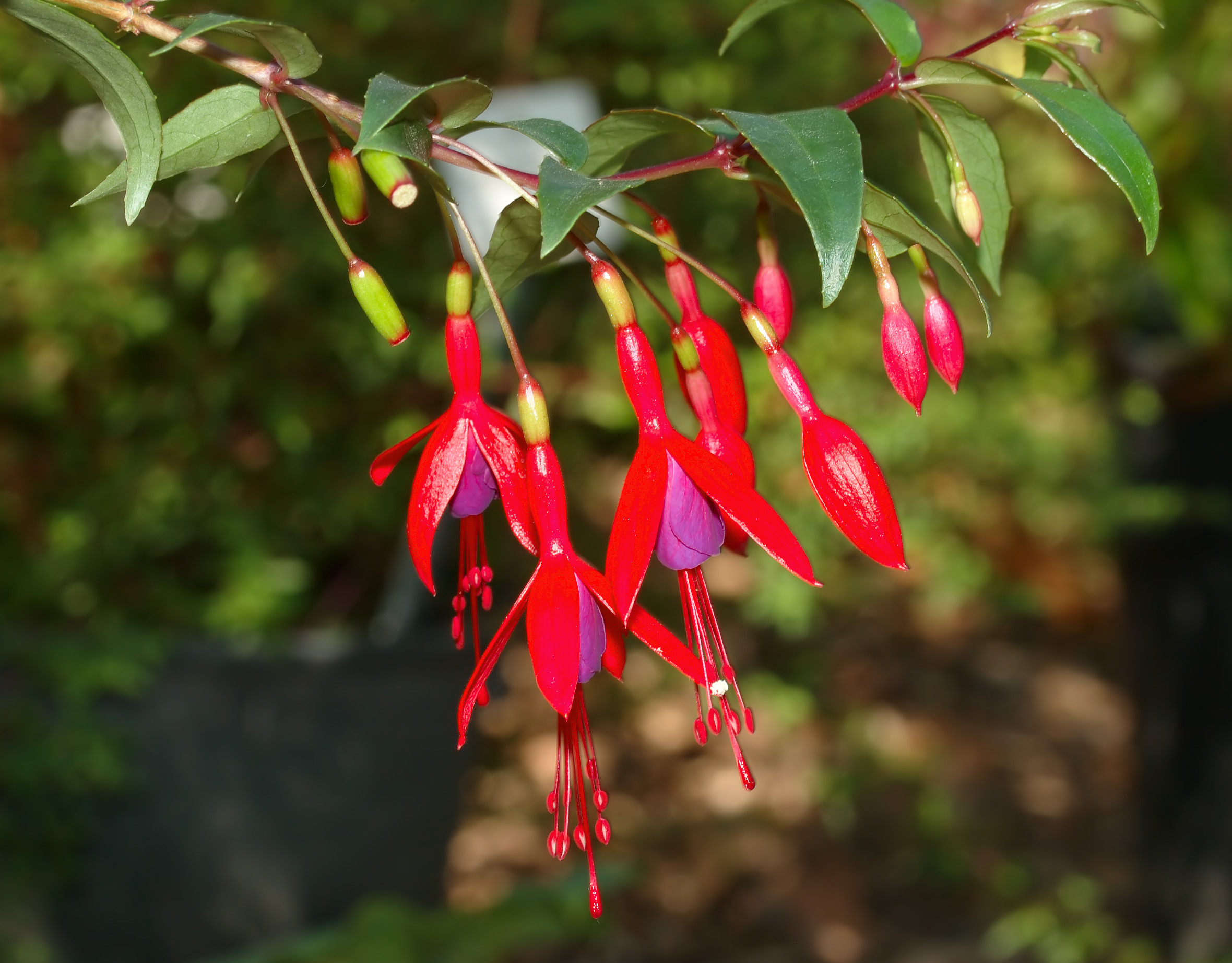

Scientific classification
- Kingdom: Plantae
- Clade: Tracheophytes
- Clade: Angiosperms
- Clade: Eudicots
- Clade: Rosids
- Order: Myrtales
- Family: Onagraceae
- Genus: Fuchsia
- Species: F. regia

Binomial name
- Fuchsia regia (Vell.) Munz 1943

Synonyms
- Fuchsia regia var. typica Munz (1943; Quelusia regia Vand. ex Vell. 1829

= Fuchsia regia =

Species of flowering plant

Fuchsia regia is a plant species in the genus Fuchsia native to Brazil.

== Description ==
It is an evergreen shrub that grows 1.5 - 5 meters tall as a lianas growing as high as 15 meters on trees, with slender, wine-purple pendulous branches arising from the base of the trunk. Leaves are simple, lanceolate, with reddish petiole, 20-140 mm x 8-70 mm, apex is acute or acuminate and the surface can be hairless or hairy. The margin is smooth or serrated with glands. The petioles are 1-3 mm x 3-35 mm. The stipules are triangular 0.8-3 x 0.4-3 mm sometimes fused or curved with age. Flowers solitary or pairs, pendulous, and flower tubes are red, cylindrical around 5-16 x 3-7 mm wide, sometimes hairy outside. The stamens are red. The ovary is oblong, 5-12 x 2-4 mm wide. The sepals are 15-45 mm long, fused at the base red or rose color. The petals are violet-fuchsia color, obovate 10-25 x 8-16 mm wide. The filaments are red-purple, 25-45 x 20-38 mm long. The style 2-6 mm long. The fruit is a berry is oblong 10-27 mm x 9-13 mm, dark purple when ripe. The seeds are tan, oblong 1.6-2.5 mm x 1-1.6 mm wide.

== Subspecies ==
- Fuchsia regia subsp. regia
- Fuchsia regia subsp. reitzii
- Fuchsia regia subsp. serrae

== Distribution ==
This species is endemic to southeast and south Brazil, distributed in the states of Bahia, Espírito Santo, Rio de Janeiro, São Paulo, Minas Gerais, Paraná, Santa Catarina, and north of Rio Grande do Sul. It lives in high altitude jungles of the Atlantic Forest, in regions with temperate temperatures and abundant rainfall, preferably in the vicinity of watercourses and in places with total or partial shade.
