= Monte Alegre dos Campos =

Municipality in Rio Grande do Sul, Brazil

Coordinates: 28°40′58″S 50°46′58″W

- Municipality
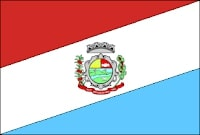
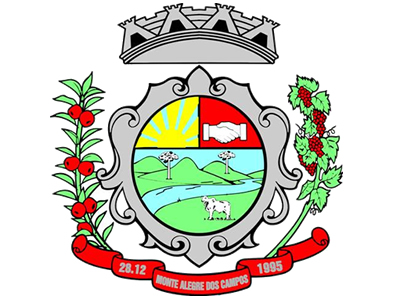
- Flag Coat of arms
- Interactive map of Monte Alegre dos Campos
- Country: Brazil
- Time zone: UTC−3 (BRT)

Monte Alegre dos Campos is a municipality in the state of Rio Grande do Sul, Brazil. As of 2020, the estimated population was 3,232.

== See also ==
- List of municipalities in Rio Grande do Sul
