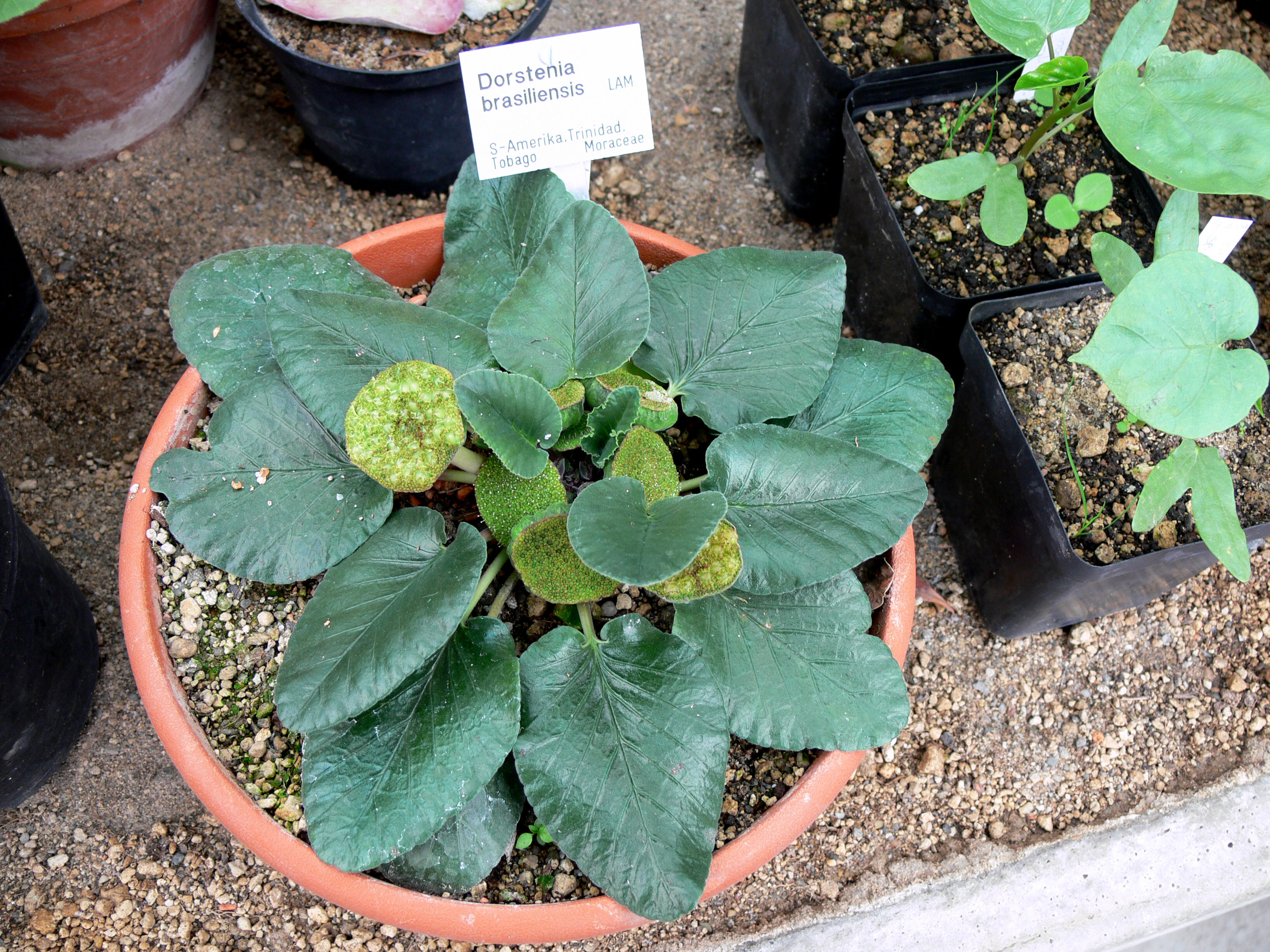

Scientific classification
- Kingdom: Plantae
- Clade: Tracheophytes
- Clade: Angiosperms
- Clade: Eudicots
- Clade: Rosids
- Order: Rosales
- Family: Moraceae
- Genus: Dorstenia
- Species: D. brasiliensis

Binomial name
- Dorstenia brasiliensis Lam.

Synonyms
- Dorstenia tubicina Ruiz & Pav. Dorstenia brasiliensis Lam. var. tubicina (Ruiz & Pav.) Chodat & Vischer; Dorstenia pernambucana Arruda; Dorstenia infundibuliformis Lodd. Dorstenia montevidensis Fielding & Gardner; Dorstenia tomentosa Fisch. & C.A.Mey. Dorstenia brasiliensis Lam. var. tomentosa (Fisch. & C.A.Mey.) Hassl. Dorstenia brasiliensis Lam. var. major Chodat; Dorstenia tubicina Lam. var. genuina f. major (Chodat) Hassl. Dorstenia montana Herzog; Dorstenia brasiliensis Lam. var. palustris Hassl. Dorstenia tubicina Ruiz & Pav. var. opifera (Mart.) Hassl. f. subexcentrica Hassl. Dorstenia brasiliensis Lam. var. guaranitica Chodat & Vischer; Dorstenia brasiliensis Lam. f. balansae Chodat; Dorstenia sabanensis Cuatrec. Dorstenia heringeri Carauta & C.Valente; Dorstenia schulzii Carauta, C.Valente & D.S.D.Araujo; Dorstenia amazonica Carauta, C.Valente & O.M.Barth

= Dorstenia brasiliensis =

Species of plant

Dorstenia brasiliensis is a species of herbaceous plant in the family Moraceae of the order Rosales.

== Distribution ==
The plant is native to northeastern and central South America, across most of Brazil,

Areas it is found include: the Amazon, Atlantic Forest, and Cerrado ecoregions; and off the northeast coast on Trinidad and Tobago.
