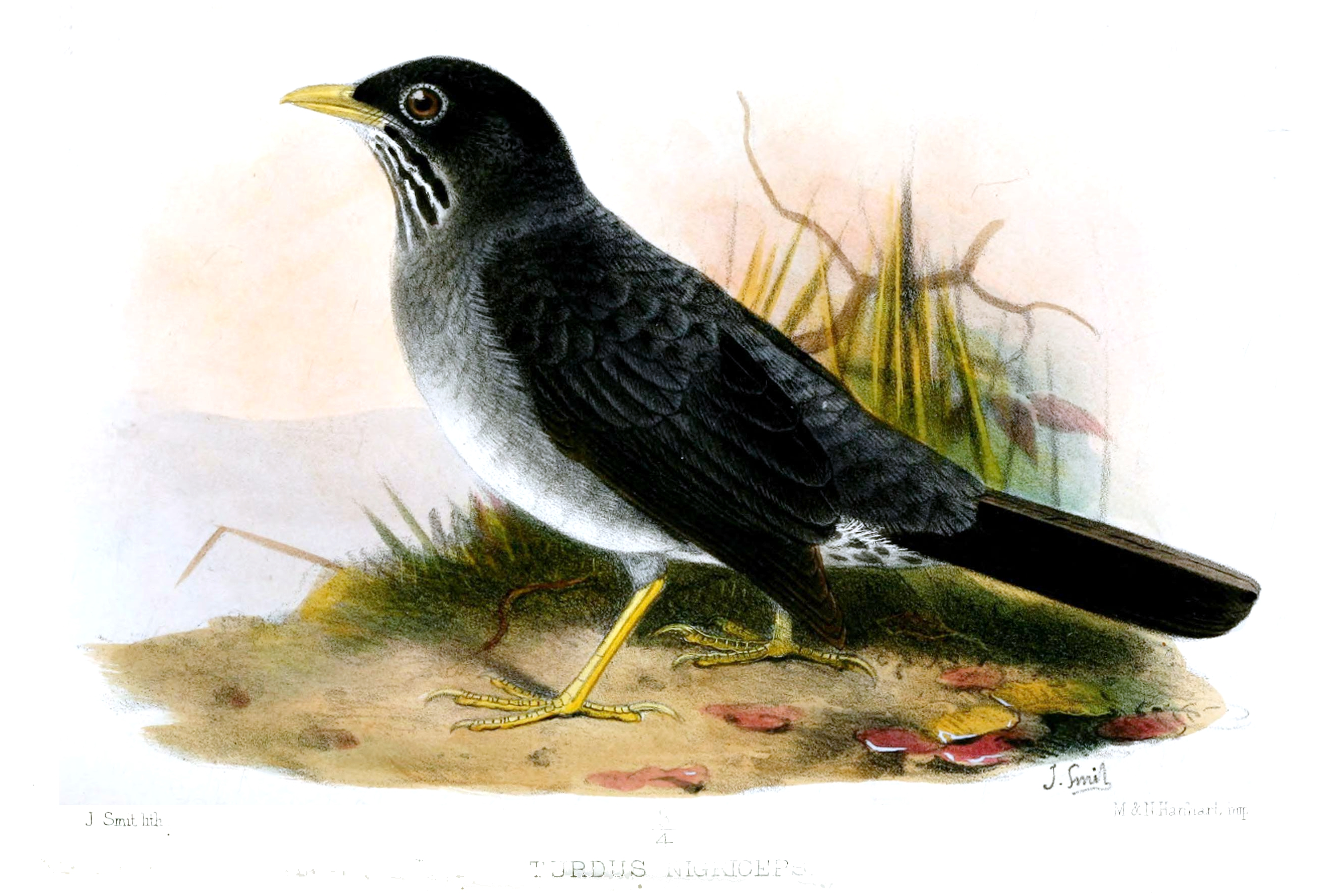

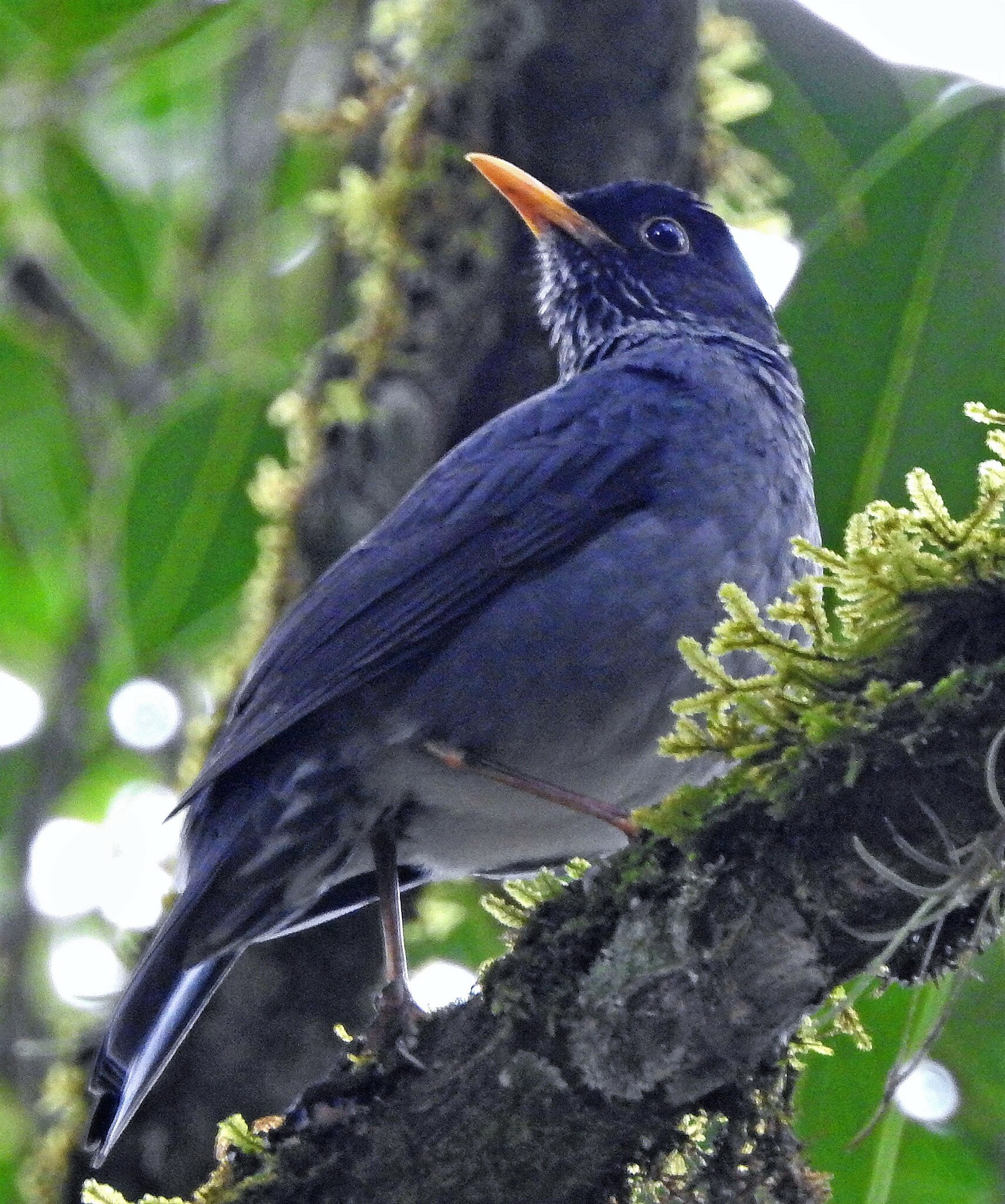

Conservation status
- Least Concern (IUCN 3.1)

Scientific classification
- Kingdom: Animalia
- Phylum: Chordata
- Class: Aves
- Order: Passeriformes
- Family: Turdidae
- Genus: Turdus
- Species: T. nigriceps

Binomial name
- Turdus nigriceps Cabanis, 1874

= Andean slaty thrush =

Species of bird

The Andean slaty thrush (Turdus nigriceps) is a species of bird in the family Turdidae. It is found in Argentina, Bolivia, Ecuador and Peru.

== Taxonomy and systematics ==
The Andean slaty thrush was originally described with its current binomial Turdus nigriceps. What is now the blacksmith thrush, or eastern slaty thrush, (T. subularis) was originally described as a species but was long treated as a subspecies of T. nigriceps with the combination called the "slaty thrush". Following studies published in the early 2000s that showed they were not close relatives, taxonomic systems separated them.

The Andean slaty thrush is monotypic.

== Description ==
The Andean slaty thrush is 18 to 23.5 cm (7.1 to 9.3 in) long and weighs 50 to 67.5 g (1.8 to 2.4 oz). The species is sexually dimorphic. Adult males have a mostly slate-gray head with a pale eye-ring and a dark-streaked white throat. Their upperparts, wings, and tail are slate-gray. Their underparts are a slightly paler slate-gray; birds in the north of their range have darker underparts than those in the south. Adult females have a greenish brown head and upperparts and somewhat paler greenish brown underparts. Both sexes have a dark iris, a yellow bill, and yellow legs and feet. Juveniles resemble adult females with orange-buff spots and streaks on the upperparts and buff to orangey underparts with a darker scaly pattern.

== Distribution and habitat ==
The Andean slaty thrush is found on the western slope of the Andes from Loja Province in far southern Ecuador into northwestern Peru's Piura and Cajamarca departments. It also is found on the eastern slope of the Andes from extreme southeastern Ecuador south through Peru and Bolivia to central Argentina's Córdoba Province.

The Andean slaty thrush inhabits a variety of subtropical landscapes including humid montane forest, secondary woodlands, and Eucalyptus plantations that maintain native undergrowth. It favors areas with dense vegetation along streams. In elevation it ranges mostly between 1,400 and 1,800 m (4,600 and 5,900 ft) in Ecuador, between 1,500 and 1,850 m (4,900 and 6,100 ft) on Peru's western slope, and mostly between 700 and 1,800 m (2,300 and 5,900 ft) but occasionally up to 2,650 m (8,700 ft) on Peru's eastern slope. It ranges from about 500 to 3,450 m (1,600 to 11,300 ft) in Bolivia and is found between 300 and 3,000 m (1,000 and 9,800 ft) in Argentina.

== Behavior ==
=== Movement ===
The Andean slaty thrush is a partial or complete migrant though its movements have not been fully defined. It is known to breed on the western slope of the Andes in Ecuador and Peru and leave that area in the non-breeding season. It breeds on the eastern slope from central Bolivia to the southern end of its range and vacates at least the more southern part of that range in the non-breeding season. It is present only as a migrant or non-breeding resident from southeastern Ecuador south through Peru to central Bolivia and perhaps beyond.

=== Feeding ===
The Andean slaty thrush feeds mostly on fruit but also includes insects and other invertebrates in its diet. It forages mostly between the forest's lower and mid-levels but regularly feeds on the ground and even in meadows near the forest edge.

=== Breeding ===
The Andean slaty thrush breeds between January and May in Ecuador and November to February in Peru. It breeds at least between December and February in Bolivia and October to December or beyond in Argentina. It builds a cup nest in a tree; nests have been found between about 3 to 20 m (10 to 65 ft) above the ground. The clutch is two to four eggs that are blue with brown speckles. The incubation period averages 12.5 days and fledging occurs an average of 13 days after hatch. Details of parental care are not known.

=== Vocalization ===
The Andean slaty thrush sings only in the austral summer breeding season. Its song is usually given from a hidden perch and is a ventriloquial "series of rather high, jumbled phrases, some notes high-pitched, rapid, shrill and burry but followed by long pause, tji tjihe tjie tjihe or swidrielipik tillie." Its calls include tick tick tick, tsok, "a melodious pilic", "a high seeee" and a "squeaky, ringing tchee-eh or tcheeEElu".

== Status ==
The IUCN has assessed the Andean slaty thrush as being of Least Concern. It has a large range; its population size is not known and is believed to be decreasing. No immediate threats have been identified. It is "uncommon and local" in southwestern Ecuador and known from only a few records in the southeast. It is uncommon and local in its far northwestern Peru breeding range and uncommon on the eastern Andean slope. It is considered locally common in Bolivia and Argentina.
