= Vacaria Airport =

Vacaria Airport Aeroporto de Vacaria
- IATA: VCC; ICAO: SNEE; LID: RS0004

Summary
- Airport type: Public
- Serves: Vacaria
- Time zone: BRT (UTC−03:00)
- Elevation AMSL: 914 m (2,999 ft)
- Coordinates: 28°25′55″S 051°01′22″W

Map
- Location in Brazil VCC (Brazil)

Runways
| Direction | Length | | Surface |
| Direction | m | ft | Surface |
|---|---|---|---|
| 11/29 | 2,020 | 6,627 | Asphalt |
- Sources: ANAC, DECEA

Vacaria Airport (IATA: VCC, ICAO: SNEE), is the airport serving Vacaria, Brazil.

== Access ==
The airport is located 13 km (8 mi) from downtown Vacaria.

== See also ==
- List of airports in Brazil
