= Capão Bonito do Sul =

Municipality of Rio Grande do Sul, Brazil

- Municipality
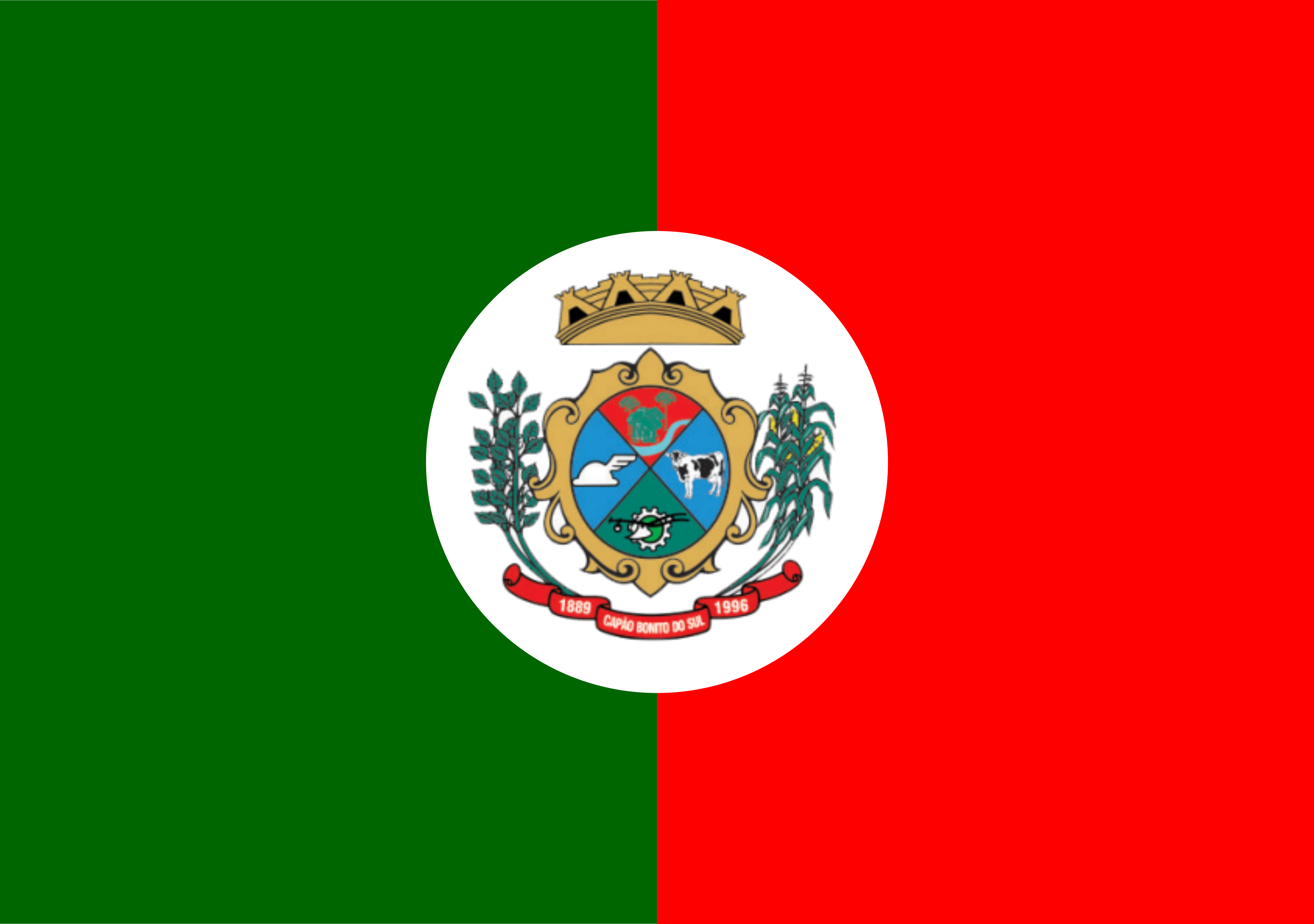
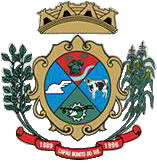
- Flag Coat of arms

- Location in Brazil
- Coordinates: 28°7′40″S 51°23′42″W
- Country: Brazil
- Region: Southern
- State: Rio Grande do Sul
- Mesoregion: Nordeste Rio-Grandense

Population (2020)
  - Total: 1,641
- Time zone: UTC−3 (BRT)

Capão Bonito do Sul is a municipality in the state of Rio Grande do Sul in the Southern Region of Brazil.

== See also ==
- List of municipalities in Rio Grande do Sul
