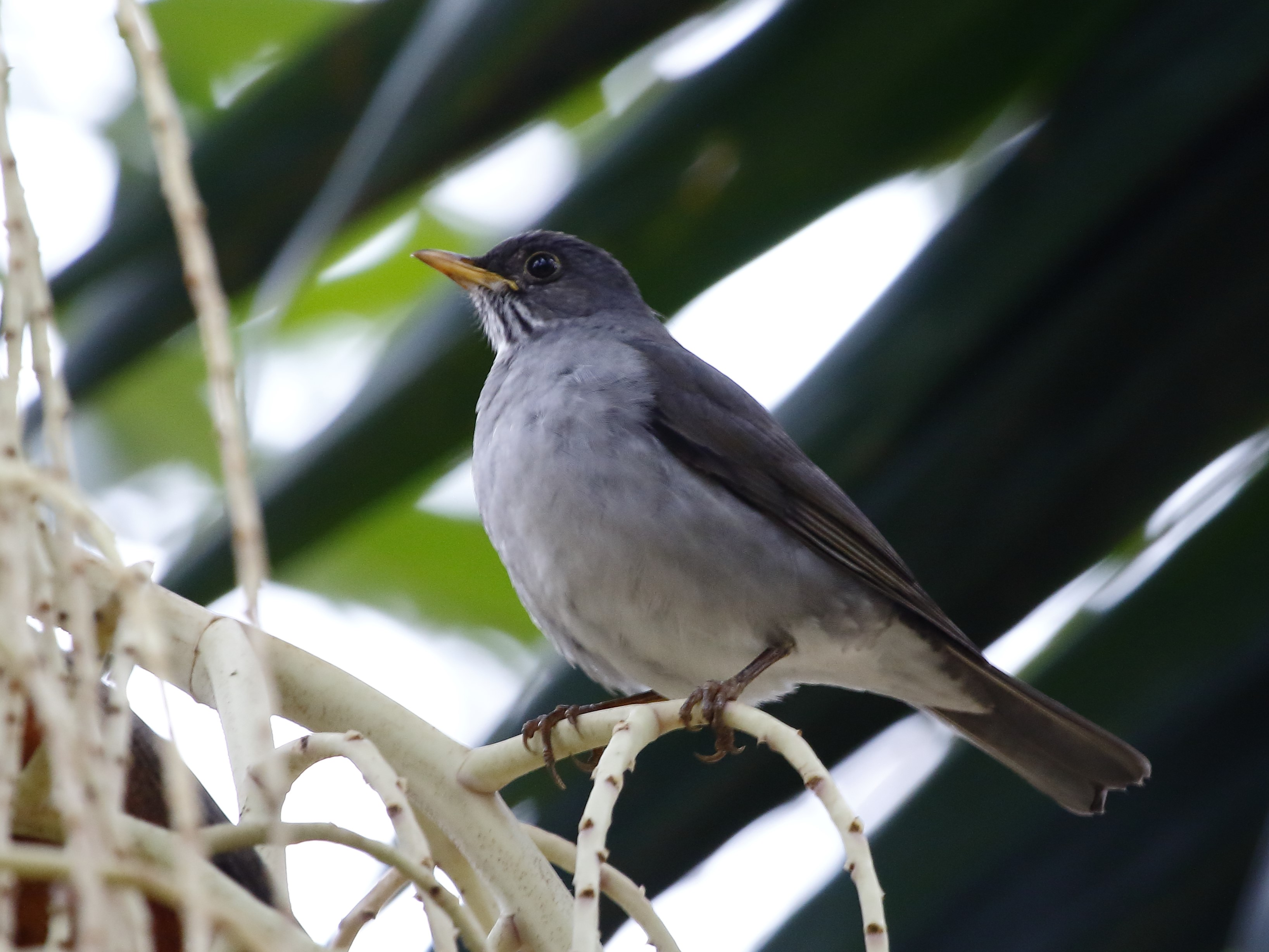

Conservation status
- Least Concern (IUCN 3.1)

Scientific classification
- Kingdom: Animalia
- Phylum: Chordata
- Class: Aves
- Order: Passeriformes
- Family: Turdidae
- Genus: Turdus
- Species: T. subalaris

Binomial name
- Turdus subalaris (Seebohm, 1887)

Synonyms
- Turdus nigriceps subalaris

= Blacksmith thrush =

Species of bird

The blacksmith thrush or eastern slaty thrush (Turdus subalaris) is a passerine bird in the family Turdidae. It is found in Argentina, Brazil, Paraguay, and Uruguay.

== Taxonomy and systematics ==
The blacksmith thrush was originally described as Merula subalaris. It was long considered as a subspecies of what is now the Andean slaty thrush (Turdus nigriceps) with the combination called the "slaty thrush". Following studies published in the early 2000s that showed they were not close relatives, taxonomic systems separated them.

The blacksmith thrush is monotypic.

== Description ==
The blacksmith thrush is 20 to 22.5 cm (7.9 to 8.9 in) long and weighs 46 to 55 g (1.6 to 1.9 oz). The species is sexually dimorphic. Adult males have a mostly gray head with an orange-yellow to brown eye-ring and a black-streaked white throat. Their upperparts, wings, and tail are gray. Their breast is a lighter gray and their belly and vent white. They have a dark brown iris. Their bill is orange-yellow to brown with orange-yellow patches and their legs and feet yellowish brown to brownish gray. Adult females are very similar but have a yellowish green to olive brown eye-ring and somewhat paler upperparts than the male. They have a dark brown iris, a pale yellowish brown to black bill, and pale yellowish brown to pale brownish olive legs and feet. Juveniles have olive-brown upperparts with orange-brown spots. Their throat and breast are palish orange-yellow with blackish feather edges and their belly white with blackish bars. Their iris is brown, their bill olive-black, and their legs and feet gray to reddish gray.

== Distribution and habitat ==
The blacksmith thrush is found in Brazil from southeastern Mato Grosso, northern Goiás, and southwestern Bahia south. Its range continues through eastern Paraguay and into northeastern Argentina's Misiones Province. The South American Classification Committee also has records in Uruguay. It inhabits forest, especially Araucaria groves, tall woodlands, gallery forest, and parks and gardens with tall trees. Overall it is found from near sea level to 1,600 m (5,200 ft) but in Brazil is found mostly below 1,000 m (3,300 ft).

== Behavior ==
=== Movement ===
The blacksmith thrush is migratory but whether full or partial is not known. It breeds in Brazil from southern Mato Grosso do Sul and São Paulo state and vacates that area in the austral winter. It spends winter north of that line. There are also scattered records of breeding in the nominally winter range. It also breeds or has bred in eastern Paraguay, northern Argentina, and Uruguay and moves north from there into Brazil for the winter.

=== Feeding ===
The blacksmith thrush feeds mostly on fruit but also includes insects and other invertebrates in its diet. It forages mostly between the forest's lower and mid-levels but regularly feeds on the ground and even in meadows near the forest edge. It has also been recorded at bird feeders.

=== Breeding ===
The blacksmith thrush's breeding season has not been fully defined but includes October to January in Brazil. It builds a nest from moss, sticks, vines, and other plant fibers, typically in a crotch of a small tree. The clutch is two to four eggs that are blue with brown speckles. The incubation period, time to fledging, and details of parental care are not known.

=== Vocalization ===
The blacksmith thrush's song is a "short series of 2-6 descending, weak, squeaky notes, give at 5- to 6-second intervals, like twee sri-sri-sri or tur-rit-twee-twee-twee". Its call is a "high, slightly upslurred tweet".

== Status ==
The IUCN has assessed the blacksmith thrush as being of Least Concern. It has a large range; its population size is not known and is believed to be decreasing. No immediate threats have been identified. In Brazil t is considered "common to frequent" in the proper season. It is considered locally common elsewhere except in Paraguay, whose records are historical.
