= Esmeralda, Rio Grande do Sul =

Municipality in Rio Grande do Sul, Brazil

Coordinates: 28°03′14″S 51°11′24″W

- Municipality
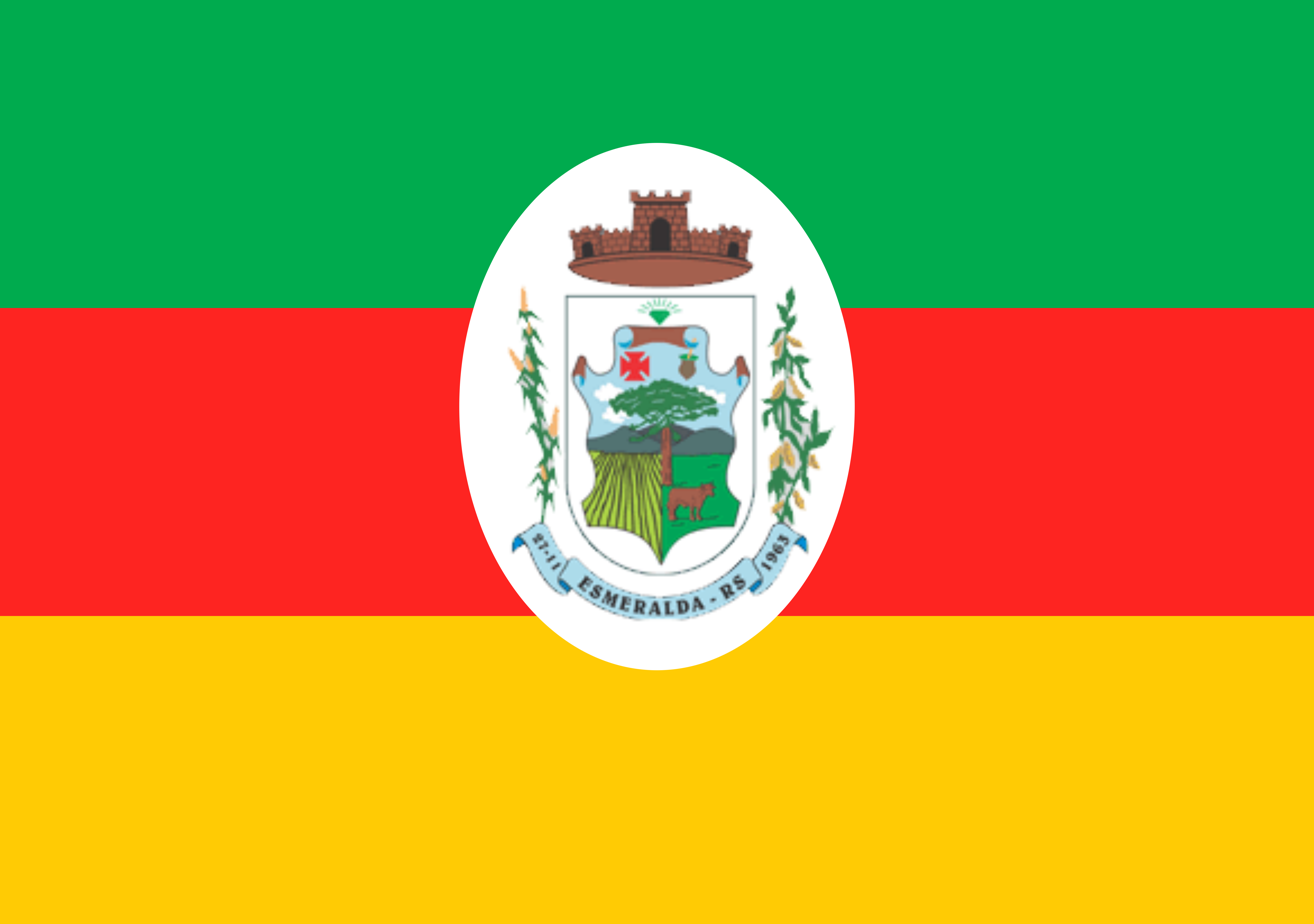
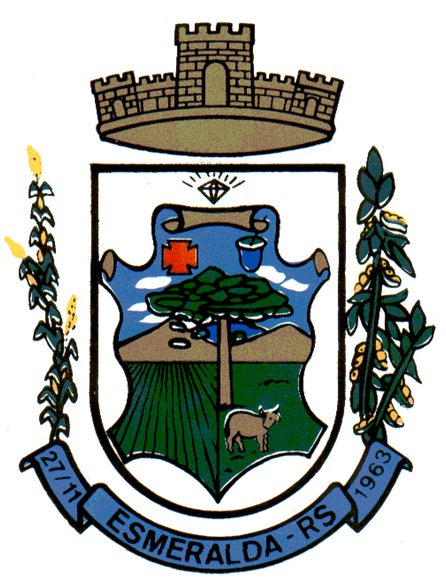
- Flag Coat of arms
- Interactive map of Esmeralda, Rio Grande do Sul
- Country: Brazil
- Time zone: UTC−3 (BRT)

Esmeralda is a municipality in the state of Rio Grande do Sul, Brazil. It was raised to municipality status in 1963, the area being taken out of the municipality of Vacaria. As of 2020, the estimated population was 3,287.

== See also ==
- List of municipalities in Rio Grande do Sul
