= Vacaria =

Municipality of Rio Grande do Sul, Brazil

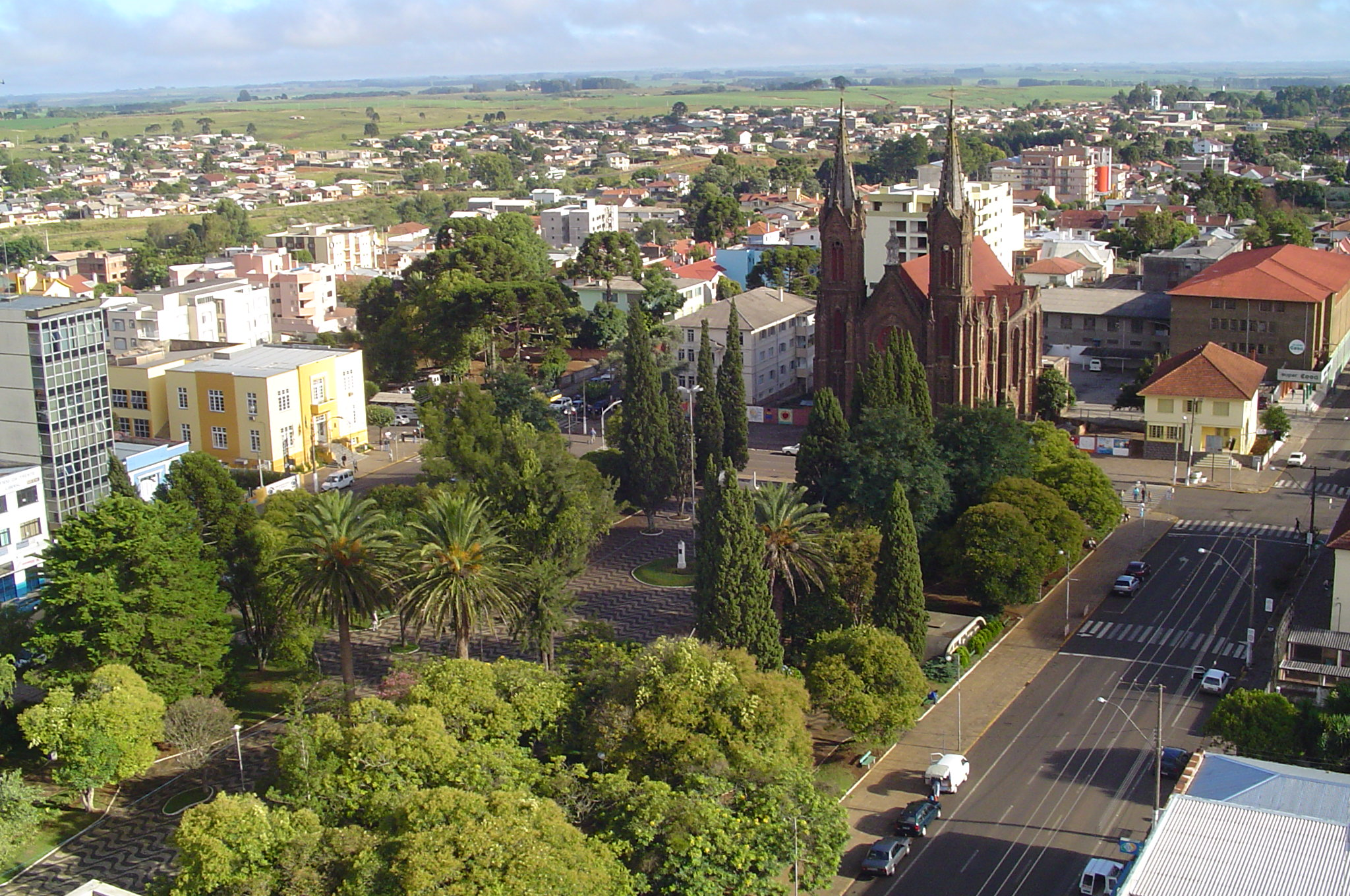
- Downtown Vacaria

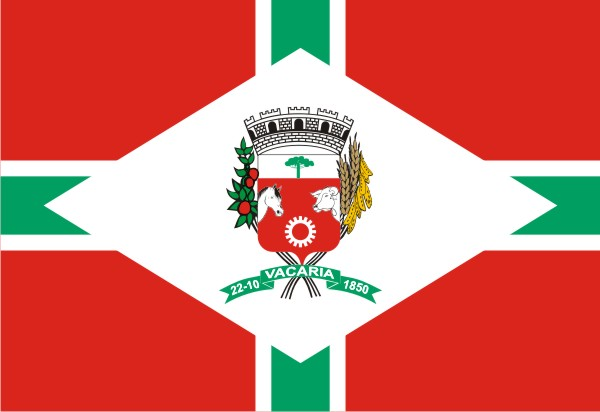
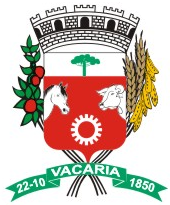
- Flag Coat of arms

- Location in Rio Grande do Sul
- Coordinates: 28°30′44″S 50°56′02″W
- Country: Brazil
- Region: South
- State: Rio Grande do Sul
- Founded: October 22, 1850

Area
  - Total: 2,123.674 km^{2} (819.955 sq mi)
- Elevation: 971 m (3,186 ft)

Population (2020)
  - Total: 66,575
  - Density: 29.3/km^{2} (76/sq mi)
- Time zone: UTC−3 (BRT)
- HDI (2000): 0.805 – high
- Website: Vacaria, Rio Grande do Sul

Vacaria is a municipality in the northeast of the southern Brazilian state of Rio Grande do Sul.

It is located at a latitude of 28° 30' 44" South and a longitude of 50° 56' 02" west, with an altitude of 971 meters. Its population in 2020 was estimated to be 66,575 inhabitants. The total area of the city is 2105.6 km^{2}. The city is known in Brazil for its climate and its production of apples.

Its Catedral Nossa Senhora da Oliveira is the episcopal see of the Roman Catholic Diocese of Vacaria, which was founded in 1937 as a territorial prelature.

== History ==
It was the Jesuit missionaries that, in the 16th century, started the colonization of the area by spreading the livestock brought from the reductions to the extensive wilderness known as "Baqueria de los Piñales". During more than a century, disputes with the Guarani Indians marked the history of the region, before it was consolidated as an official trail connecting the Plata region to Brazil. In the 19th century the fields of Vacaria were once more the stage of great battles, this time between the imperial soldiers and the republican revolutionists (Ragamuffin War).

== Economy ==
Its economy is based on cattle raising, agriculture, transportation, flower growing and fruit growing. Vacaria is the largest producer of apples in Rio Grande do Sul and 2nd in the country and is considered the introductory location of wild fruits such as mulberry, bilberry, strawberry and raspberry. The per capita income was estimated by the IBGE in 2003 to be R$9.213,91

== Attractions ==
Venue of the International Crioulo Rodeo (Rodeio Crioulo Internacional), one of the most important demonstrations of the gaucho culture, the city has also other attractions, such as the Fazenda do Socorro and the beautiful stone-built Cathedral of Our Lady of the Olive Tree.

In addition to natural attractions such as the valley of the Pelotas River and the Parque das Cachoeiras, Vacaria has cultural attractions including the city museum, the Atelier Livre, the public market, the center of craftwork and the Casa do Povo, the only work of the architect Oscar Niemeyer in Rio Grande do Sul. Vacaria is also known for the production of a cheese based on the method of the Italian cheese Grana Padano.

== Climate ==
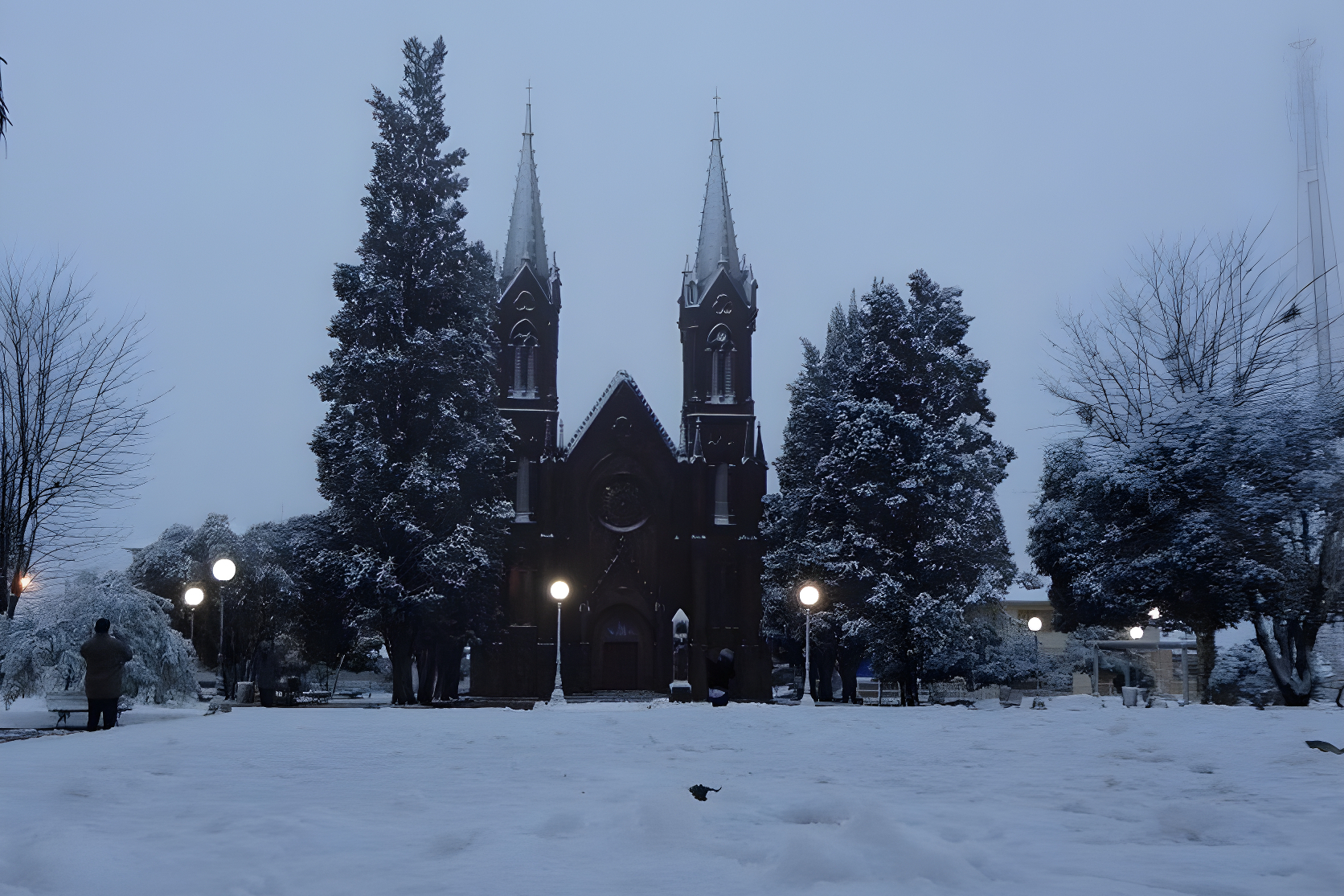
Snow in Vacaria in 2020

Vacaria has a temperate oceanic climate (Köppen climate classification Cfb). With mild summers that have an average high of about 24 °C and an average low of about 14 °C. And winters with average high temperature of about 16 °C and an average low of about 7 °C. During winter the temperature commonly goes below freezing but rarely does it snow. In the winter of 1879, was recorded the strongest blizzard in Brazil, with accumulation of 2 meters in the urban area of Vacaria.

Climate data for Vacaria, elevation 970 m (3,180 ft), (1961–1990)
Month	Jan	Feb	Mar	Apr	May	Jun	Jul	Aug	Sep	Oct	Nov	Dec	Year
Record high °C (°F)	34.1 (93.4)	32.4 (90.3)	31.1 (88.0)	29.0 (84.2)	26.6 (79.9)	24.6 (76.3)	26.4 (79.5)	32.9 (91.2)	30.1 (86.2)	31.2 (88.2)	35.5 (95.9)	32.8 (91.0)	35.5 (95.9)
Mean daily maximum °C (°F)	26.1 (79.0)	26.1 (79.0)	24.3 (75.7)	21.2 (70.2)	19.0 (66.2)	17.1 (62.8)	17.3 (63.1)	18.1 (64.6)	19.2 (66.6)	21.6 (70.9)	23.5 (74.3)	25.0 (77.0)	21.5 (70.7)
Daily mean °C (°F)	19.4 (66.9)	19.7 (67.5)	18.0 (64.4)	14.9 (58.8)	12.5 (54.5)	10.8 (51.4)	10.9 (51.6)	11.7 (53.1)	13.2 (55.8)	15.4 (59.7)	17.1 (62.8)	18.6 (65.5)	15.2 (59.4)
Mean daily minimum °C (°F)	14.5 (58.1)	15.1 (59.2)	13.7 (56.7)	10.4 (50.7)	7.7 (45.9)	6.3 (43.3)	6.4 (43.5)	7.1 (44.8)	8.8 (47.8)	10.5 (50.9)	12.1 (53.8)	13.5 (56.3)	10.5 (50.9)
Record low °C (°F)	4.6 (40.3)	6.1 (43.0)	1.7 (35.1)	−1.0 (30.2)	−4.5 (23.9)	−8.9 (16.0)	−5.5 (22.1)	−5.6 (21.9)	−5.1 (22.8)	−0.5 (31.1)	2.4 (36.3)	2.8 (37.0)	−8.9 (16.0)
Average precipitation mm (inches)	158.0 (6.22)	155.0 (6.10)	143.0 (5.63)	126.0 (4.96)	135.0 (5.31)	145.0 (5.71)	148.0 (5.83)	163.0 (6.42)	183.0 (7.20)	161.0 (6.34)	130.0 (5.12)	142.0 (5.59)	1,789 (70.43)
Average precipitation days (≥ 1.0 mm)	12	9	10	7	5	7	9	10	10	10	8	9	106
Average relative humidity (%)	75.6	78.7	79.6	80.4	80.1	80.5	79.9	80.4	79.0	78.0	76.0	76.2	78.7
Source: INMET (precipitation 2008–2020)

== Transportation ==
The city is served by Vacaria Airport.

== See also ==
- List of municipalities in Rio Grande do Sul

== Sources and external links ==
- Climate of Vacaria
- Snow in Vacaria
