= List of Brazil tornadoes =

List of tornadoes in Brazil

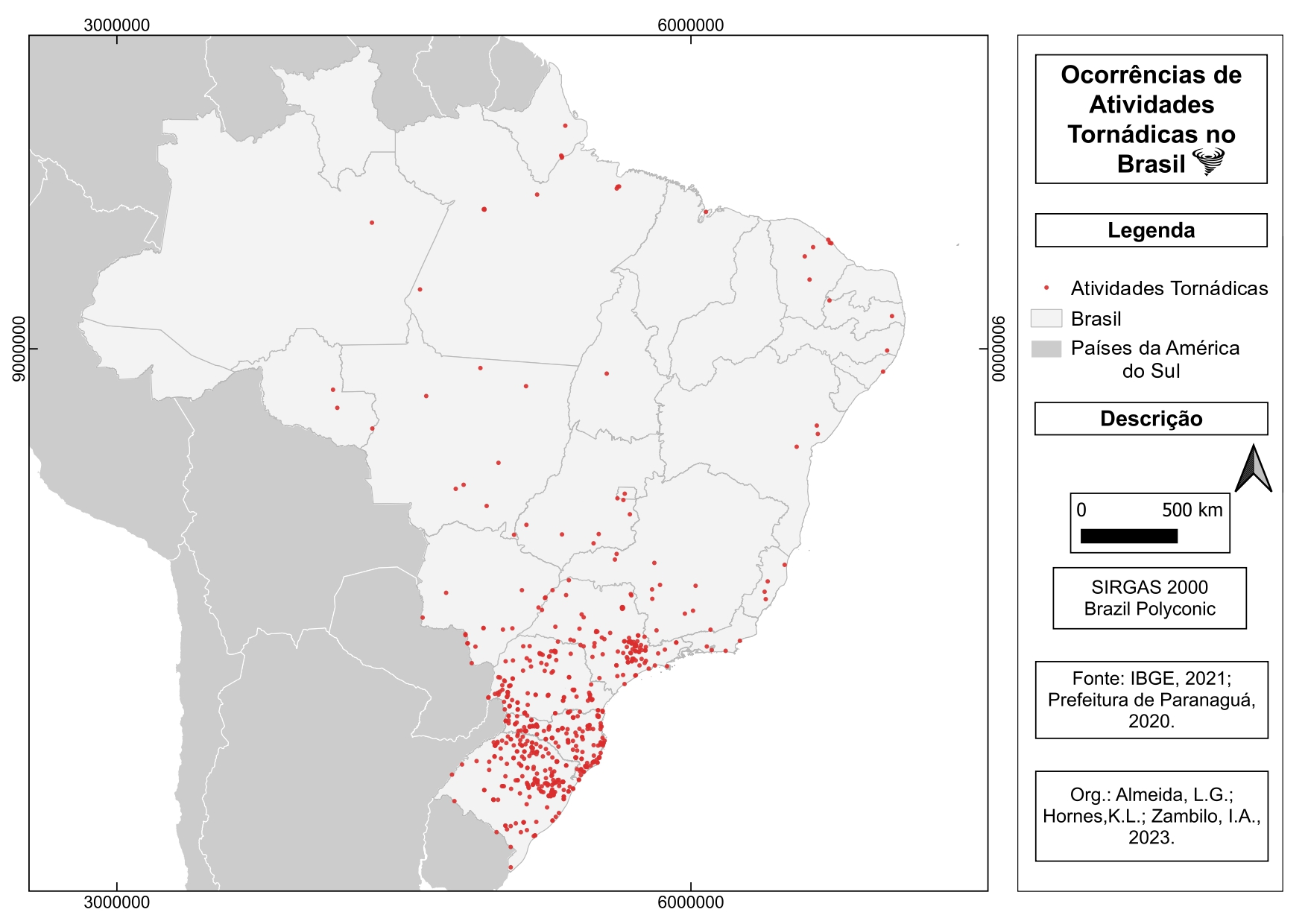
A map showing all tornadoes documented by UEPG from 1975–2018

Brazil is one of the countries with the highest incidence of tornadoes outside the regions traditionally known for such phenomena. According to a survey by the State University of Ponta Grossa (UEPG), between 1975 and 2018, a total of 581 tornadoes were recorded in the country, 411 of which occurred in the Southern Region, accounting for approximately 70% of all cases.

In 2018, the PREVOTS platform was established to document severe weather events across Brazil. Upon completing five years of operation, a report indicated that between June 2018 and June 2023, 321 damage incidents caused by tornadoes were recorded, including waterspouts. Most tornadoes in Brazil are associated with high-precipitation supercells, resulting in rain-wrapped tornadoes that are difficult to see.

The annual average number of tornadoes in Brazil remains uncertain due to the country's less robust meteorological infrastructure compared to nations like the United States or Canada, and because of the low population density in the most tornado-prone areas. These factors contribute to underreporting, with many tornadoes being identified only months or even years after they occur. Recent estimates suggest a plausible average of 50 to 60 tornadoes per year, although this figure lacks official confirmation due to the aforementioned limitations.

== Climatology ==
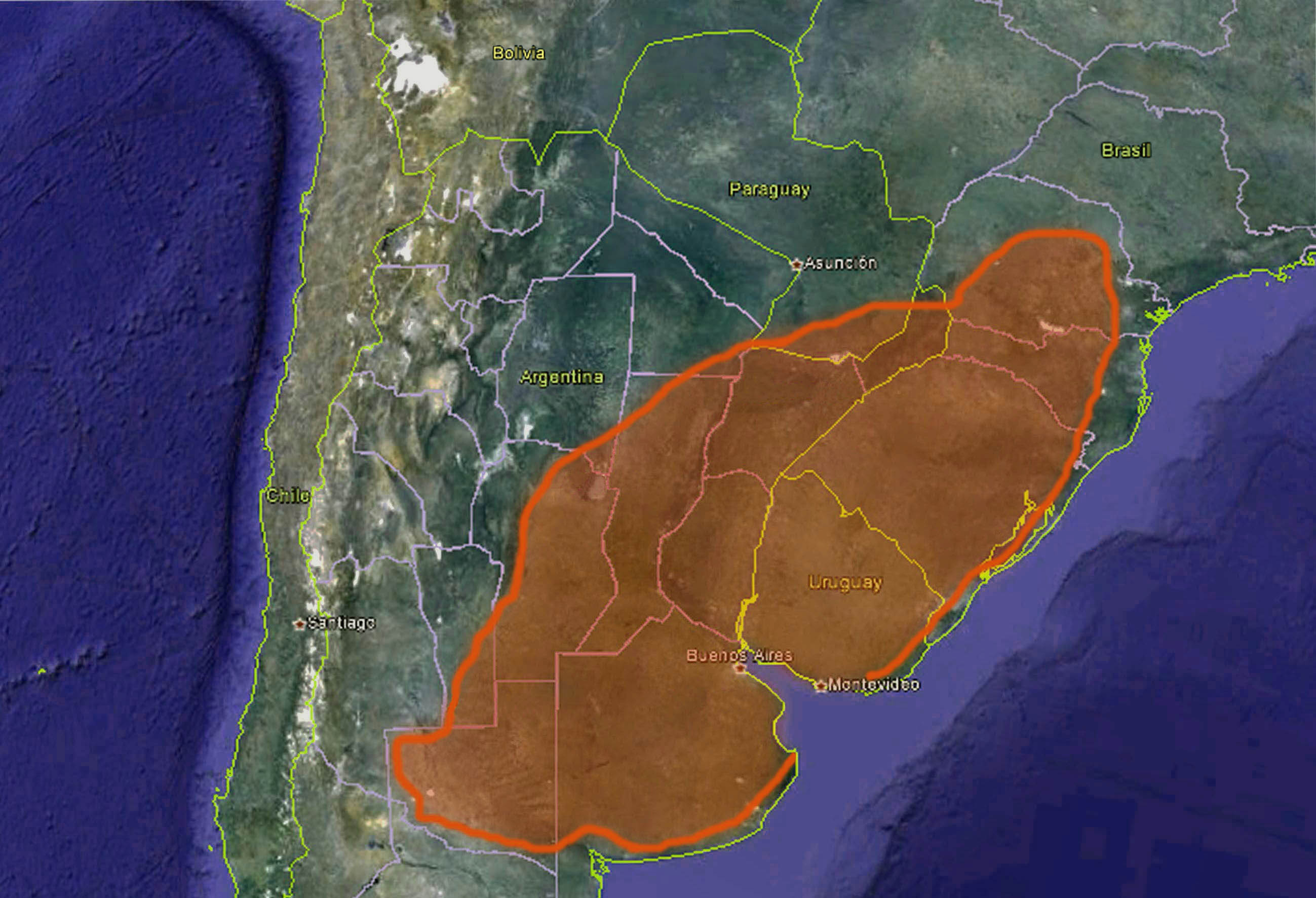
Map of the tornado-prone region in South America.

Twenty-five of Brazil's 26 states have recorded at least one tornado since 1970, the only one without confirmation being the state of Acre. Even the Federal District has experienced tornado episodes, but most of them were landspouts. This is due to the tropical, semi-humid climate present throughout the country, but the southern states, the interior of São Paulo state in the Southeast, and southern Mato Grosso do Sul in the Center-West, are the most recorded, accounting for 95% of the country's tornadoes. This is because they are part of the "Pasillo de los tornados", a region of South America prone to tornadoes due to the meeting of warm, humid air masses from the Amazon rainforest, Gran Chaco, and the Atlantic Ocean, which meet cold, dry air masses from Patagonia and Antarctica, in addition to the hot, dry winds from the Andes mountain range. These areas are also influenced by severe convective storms from the Río de la Plata basin. A Harvard study revealed that the frequency of tornadoes in this alley is not even higher due to the ruggedness of the Amazon rainforest, which reduces vorticity near the ground. Although this region experiences a high number of severe storms throughout the year, this limitation significantly reduces the chances of tornado formation. Possibly, without this obstacle, the region could have a frequency equal to or even greater than that of North America.

However, a study on the development and intensification of mesocyclones in rough environments showed that neither very high nor very low roughness levels can favor the intensification and development of the mesocyclone. Furthermore, even environments with high roughness still produced tornadoes, although generally weaker ones. In other words, roughness is not the main factor behind the low incidence of tornadoes in regions with a high incidence of severe storms; what actually happens is that the available research on the subject is still not very robust.

In the summer, the eastern part of the state of Santa Catarina, where most of the coastline is located, is an area more prone to convective storms due to orographic forces. Consequently, tornadoes can occur.

In the fall, despite a lower density function of events, records are still notable between the states of Paraná and Santa Catarina, also extending towards the state of São Paulo (SP), where, in this season, the infamous F3 tornado of Indaiatuba occurred in May 2005.

In the winter, the KDE map has a density in the center and east of the state of São Paulo and in all the states of the South, with a higher concentration in the north of Rio Grande do Sul and west-central Santa Catarina. The intense baroclinicity during the winter is responsible for the increase in JBN episodes. In addition, the presence of intense flow at low levels associated with the JBN contributes to intensifying shear at low levels. A curious fact is that, during this period, the number of tornadoes decreased in the southwest and far south of Rio Grande do Sul. However, the low population density may be the reason.

In the spring, these regions with fewer occurrences see an increase in frequency, but still in smaller numbers than in northern Rio Grande do Sul. At this time, the Hotspot (northern Rio Grande do Sul) weakens and moves further west in the state.

El Niño years (positive ENSO) are frequently more active, as was the case in 2009, which had at least 19 events, with an outbreak in western Santa Catarina, including a deadly F4 tornado in the municipality of Guaraciaba. On August 13 and 14, 1959, an outbreak of at least 10 tornadoes, including F4+ tornadoes, struck southern Brazil, killing more than 100 people. Other examples include the years 1965, 1987, 1991/92, 1997/98, 2005, 2015/16, and 2023, where there were also many events, including notable occurrences. On the other hand, the rainy seasons, especially in spring, have records slightly below average.

On the other hand, La Niña seasons, especially in the spring, have records slightly below average. Neutral years, however, have records within their normal flow. This cited study focused on older events, so the number of records tends to be lower than the current one, as we used convincing newspaper reports and satellite images, whenever possible, for records after 1960.

Tornadoes in this alley are comparable to Dixie Alley, with HP supercell tornadoes being more common, and the terrain is more undulating, with one exception in the Pampas. Furthermore, nocturnal tornadoes or outbreaks are more common, as was the case with the outbreak on the night of September 7, 2009, in the province of Misiones, Argentina, and southern Brazil. Tornadoes generally range from F0 to F2, but some violent and deadly tornadoes have occurred, such as an F5 in San Justo, Argentina, in 1973; an F5 in Encarnación, Paraguay, in 1926, with over 300 deaths; an F4 in Fray Marcos, department of Florida, Uruguay, in 1970.

== Events ==
This list only has records documented and cited in reliable articles.

=== Total count ===
Confirmed tornadoes by Fujita rating
FU	F0	F1	F2	F3	F4	F5	Total
36	28	67	51	29	15	0	469

- Note: 243 tornadoes have been confirmed but not yet rated.
- Note: Some tornadoes have been rated using different scales. They are counted as their closest F-Scale equivalent on this table.

=== Pre-1950 ===
- September 14, 1921 – A tornado struck the town of Chavantes, in the state of São Paulo, causing much destruction. The tornado destroyed brick homes, uprooted power lines and fences, damaged farms, and destroyed crops. In total, seven people died and many were injured. Several animals were also killed. At the time, the event was called a cyclone, but the characteristics of the reports indicate it was a tornado.
- October 24, 1927 – A multi-vortex tornado struck the city of Ponta Grossa in Paraná State, causing many destruction, killing 3 people and injuring severe others. The tornado was officially classified as E/F2.
- May 21, 1938 – A severe/violent and deadly tornado struck the Atuba neighborhood in Curitiba, in Paraná. Houses were completely destroyed. One was thrown 50 meters, according to a newspaper at the time. Another house, 7 meters in size, disappeared from the map. Many animals died, including pigs, cows, and oxen; some were sucked from their pens. Trees were uprooted and apparently "flattened," according to reports from the time. Crops suffered severe devastation. A brickyard had a large part of its structure collapse. A pipe factory was destroyed, resulting in enormous material and financial losses. The newspaper classified the tornado as an F4. The tornado, dubbed "The Gale of Death" by a newspaper, killed 18 people and injured at least 50.
- May 16, 1948 – A violent nighttime tornado struck Valinhos, in the interior of the municipality of Canoinhas, in Santa Catarina. Several homes, a school, and a church were completely destroyed. A sawmill was also destroyed, and the wooden planks located there were turned into projectiles, resulting in fatal injuries to animals and people. Many of these projectiles were embedded in trees. In addition, other trees were uprooted and left without bark. People were found far from their homes, many already dead, and some of them naked. Eighteen people died instantly, and another five died in the hospital (23 deaths in total). Officially, the tornado was classified as an F3, with winds estimated at 300 km/h (186 mph). However, much of the damage is consistent with an F4 tornado, and many storm chasers consider it to be of that intensity.

=== 1950–1959 ===
FU	F0	F1	F2	F3	F4	F5	Total
0	0	0	0	0	1	0	~7
Deaths: ~90				Injuries: ≥550			

- May 18, 1955 – A strong tornado struck Serra das Mortes, in the interior of Canoinhas. Wooden houses were destroyed and thrown into the air. The tornado injured at least four people. Another tornado may have struck Papanduva, resulting in the destruction of homes and nine deaths.
- May 1957 – A tornado measuring 300 to 400 meters (984 to 1,312 ft) wide destroyed farms and buildings from Guarapuava to Cascavel, Paraná, in addition to uprooting trees and piling them on top of each other. The tornado left a visible and well-defined path, possibly an F3+ or higher.
- April 25, 1959 – A strong tornado struck the municipality of Aratiba, in Rio Grande do Sul. 56 houses were affected, with 33 being completely destroyed. A school building was damaged, and forested areas were devastated. It traveled approximately 40 km (24.8 mi) and devastated the west–east part of the municipality. In addition, the tornado may have also hit the neighboring municipality of Erechim, causing further extensive damage to crops. In total, 10 people died, 104 were injured, and almost 200 were left homeless.

Tornadoes confirmed in southern Brazil on August 13 and 14, 1959 (Note: The outbreak of August 13–14, 1959, in southern Brazil was the deadliest in South America and the Southern Hemisphere.)
Date	F/EF#	Deaths	Injuries	Location
August 13, 1959	F?	11	Many	Veranópolis (RS)
Around 9 p.m., a violent tornado struck Veranópolis, Rio Grande do Sul. Large trees were uprooted. Wooden houses were completely destroyed. People were thrown, one of them over 100 meters (> 109 yd) into the air, falling dead into a river. A church suffered serious damage, and its door was found in the municipality of Pinto Bandeira. Eleven people died and many were injured.
August 13, 1959	F?	18	≥40	Rio dos Pardos in Canoinhas (SC)
Around 10 p.m., a violent tornado struck Rio dos Pardos, in the interior of Canoinhas, in Santa Catarina. Wooden houses were completely destroyed, leaving piles of debris. Crops and forests were devastated, and ironwork was twisted. The tornado killed about 18 people and injured about 40.
August 14, 1959	F?	~15	≥100	Lages (SC)
A very strong tornado struck Lages, Santa Catarina. Approximately five hundred and fifty homes were destroyed. Several trees were uprooted. In the town square, three cedar trees were swept away. A brickworks and a sports hall were leveled. A factory was partially destroyed, as was an amusement park. The tornado killed at least five people, left over one hundred injured, and approximately five hundred homeless.
August 14, 1959	F4	35	~300	Palmas & União da Vitoria (PR)
Around 6:30 pm, a violent tornado struck the cities of Palmas and União da Vitória, Paraná. Houses were swept away, some even losing their floors. People were thrown more than 50 meters, resulting in instant death. Victims were found naked. Entire trees were uprooted, and herds of cattle were completely decimated. A newly built two-story farmhouse was completely destroyed, leaving only the floor. A steam locomotive was thrown away. A farmer's jacket, with his wallet and documents in the pocket, was found in Horizonte, about 70 km away (43.3 mi). The tornado killed 35 people and injured dozens, with some victims and injured being mutilated.
August 14, 1959	F?	0	≥2	Lapa (PR)
Around 9 p.m., a strong tornado struck Lapa, Paraná. The town's church and cemetery suffered severe damage. Houses were completely destroyed, with a schoolhouse being ripped from its foundations. One image shows a mattress stuck in a large pine tree. Two people were injured.

=== 1960–1969 ===
- May 27, 1965 – A strong tornado struck city of Guarapuava,uprooting trees with 30-centimeter roots, destroying homes, as well as a school, killing a teacher and her son and injuring several people, and leaving a very visible trail traced by the LANDSAT radar.
- July 9, 1965 – A very strong nighttime tornado struck the municipalities of Manoel Ribas, Pitanga, Marialva, and Maringá in Paraná State. It uprooted coffee trees, destroyed forests, and threw a house 148 meters, which landed on Keller Road with its residents inside, resulting in 2 deaths. The tornado occurred during a strong and long-lasting storm with numerous lightning strikes. In total, 80 people were injured and 8 died.
- September 1, 1967 – An F3 tornado struck the city of Lajeado in Rio Grande do Sul. It lasted a little over 3 minutes and destroyed hundreds of buildings, including a parish. The tornado killed 6 people and injured 60.

=== 1970–1979 ===
FU	F0	F1	F2	F3	F4	F5	Total
2	0	0	0	1	0	0	3
Deaths: 15				Injuries: many			

- August 8, 1976 – An F3 tornado struck the city of Guarujá do Sul, in Santa Catarina, destroying houses and uprooting trees. The tornado killed one person and injured many others.
- January 28, 1977 – A tornado struck the city of Bom Jardim da Serra in Santa Catarina, partially destroying houses and causing moderate damage.
- June 17, 1977 – Around 7 a.m., a waterspout formed on the Rio Sergipe (Aracaju, Sergipe) and headed towards a vegetable market. Zinc roof tiles were thrown hundreds of meters away, causing supporting beams and the collapse of the market's roof. In total, nine people died and 145 were injured.

=== 1984–1989 ===
FU	F0	F1	F2	F3	F4	F5	Total
9	1	0	1	6	0	0	17
Deaths: ≥30				Injuries: >1576			

- July 8, 1984 – An unrated tornado struck town of Belém in Pará.
- October 9, 1984 – An F3 tornado struck the city of Maravilha in Santa Catarina, It destroyed part of the city, destroying houses and posts, causing 5 deaths and more than 400 injuries, in addition to 980 people left homeless.
- February 17, 1985 – a waterspout hit the capital of São Paulo.
- May 13, 1987 – An F3 tornado struck the city of São Joaquim in Santa Catarina, caused severe damage to the city, some houses suffered serious damage, with one of them completely destroyed. 5 people died and many others were injured.
- May 20, 1987 – An F3 tornado that lasted a little over 3 minutes hit the city of Piedade in the state of São Paulo, knocking down trees and destroying houses. A TV report showed that from May 20 to 22, 926 people were admitted to the hospital with injuries caused by the tornado, the vast majority with minor injuries. Classified as a tornado due to the damage and visual reports of the funnel on the ground and causing destruction.
- May 20, 1987 – An unrated tornado struck town of Peruíbe in São Paulo.
- May 31, 1987 – An F0 tornado struck town of Piedade in São Paulo.
- July 7, 1987 – An F2 tornado hit the city of Xanxerê in Santa Catarina, killing 1 person.
- July 15, 1987 – An unrated tornado struck town of Planalto in Paraná.
- July 29, 1989 – A very strong nighttime tornado struck the municipality of Ivinhema, in Mato Grosso do Sul. Several houses were destroyed, one even losing its floor, and its furniture was found 2 km away. The stove in this house was never found, indicating granulation. A brick nightclub suffered severe damage, resulting in 16 deaths (possibly 19) and approximately 250 injuries. In an interview, a local resident reported "three head of cattle dead, six missing, a 4x4 truck destroyed to its foundations, and a house swept away." Furthermore, several plantations were devastated, including coffee plantations. Another resident reported: "The sound of several jet planes landing at the same time." In total, possibly 19 people died and 250 were injured. This information was taken from an amateur documentary focusing on the damage and interviews. The tornado was officially classified as an F3, but some damage suggests an F4 tornado.
- August 8, 1989 – An F3 tornado struck town of Forquilhinha in Santa Catarina, any information about damage or casualties is unknown.
- September 11, 1989 – A tornado measuring as a F3 struck the town of Pato Branco in Paraná, destroying many houses, uprooted trees, knocking down power poles. killing 1 person and injuring many.
- September 12, 1989 – A tornado struck the town of Itaipulândia in Paraná. Dozens of homes were reduced to rubble, the power grid was down, and entire families were left homeless. A church suffered serious damage. Killing 3 people.
- November 11, 1989 – An unrated tornado struck town of São Carlos in Santa Catarina.
- November 11, 1989 – An unrated tornado struck town of Xanxerê in Santa Catarina.
- November 24, 1989 – An unrated tornado struck town of Correia Pinto in Santa Catarina.
- November 24, 1989 – An unrated tornado struck town of Garuva in Santa Catarina.

=== 1990–1999 ===
FU	F0	F1	F2	F3	F4	F5	Total
19	3	6	6	4	2	0	41
Deaths: ≥45				Injuries: >510			

- March 10, 1991 – An unrated tornado struck the town of Boituva, in São Paulo.
- April 26, 1991 – An F1 tornado struck the town of Xanxerê, in Santa Catarina.
- April 26, 1991 – An F3 tornado struck the town of São Bernardo do Campo in São Paulo, this tornado knocked down trees and overturned 10 trucks weighing 25 tons each.
- August 9, 1991 – Around 5:30 p.m., a violent tornado struck Três Barras (Canoinhas), in Santa Catarina. Mixed-construction houses (brick and wood) were completely destroyed; in a video, it's possible to see that one of them had only its foundation remaining. Power poles were snapped, twisted, and uprooted. A church was completely destroyed. Large trees were uprooted. The tornado injured eight people. Damage suggests a low-end F4 tornado in part of the path.
- September 30, 1991 – Around 6:30 PM, a powerful F4 tornado struck the city of Itu, in the state of São Paulo, devastating everything in a strip 200 to 400 meters wide and 30 km long (18.6 mi), stretching from the Açucar Highway (SP-308) to the Serra do Japi mountain range. Vehicles were found more than 600 meters from their original locations, and a blue Chevette was thrown 700 meters away with two occupants inside, resulting in the death of both. Two gas stations, five factories, three schools, and more than 280 houses were destroyed, the vast majority of them made of masonry. A 100-ton, 25-meter-high obelisk was toppled. Power lines and towers were thrown several meters away, while trees were uprooted and brutally twisted. Both rural and urban areas of Itu suffered significant damage that day. At kilometer 27 of the Santos Dumont highway (SP-075), a 22-ton bus carrying students overturned for more than 30 meters, resulting in the death of 10 students. In addition to leaving 450,000 people without electricity, the tornado caused 16 deaths and more than 250 injuries. Many accidents were caused by the blackout. At the time (1991), the tornado was classified as F3, but in 2012, a meteorologist from Unicamp cited its classification as F4. In 2016, it was reclassified as F5, according to a major São Paulo newspaper. Despite this, there has been no official confirmation or technical study of this reclassification to date, although the article included a quote from the meteorologist responsible for the F4 classification in 2012. The neighboring municipalities of Salto, Indaiatuba, Rio Claro, Porto Feliz, Jundiaí, and Cabreúva also suffered from strong winds or possible tornadoes. The tornado in Itu is known locally as the "Itu Gale" (Vendaval de Itu). It was after this tornado that the term "tornado" began to be used in Brazil, because before that, people thought these events were just a "gale" or cyclone/typhoon.
- November 30, 1991 – An unrated tornado struck the town of Bauru, in São Paulo, mainly affecting the rural zone and leaving a trail 18 kilometers (11 miles) long and 500 meters wide. It is presumed to have been an F2 tornado or higher.
- November 30, 1991 – An F0 tornado struck metropolitan region of ABC, in São Paulo.
- May 17, 1992 – An F3 tornado struck the town of Almirante Tamandaré, in Paraná,approximately 500 houses suffered serious damage, the vast majority being completely destroyed, 6 people died and at least 33 were injured.
- May 17, 1992 – An F2 tornado struck the city of Curitiba, in Paraná.
- May 17, 1992 – An unrated tornado struck the town of Palmeira, in Paraná.
- May 22, 1992 – A strong F3 tornado struck the town of Borrazópolis, in Paraná. A block of houses was destroyed, with some homes left with only the bathroom still standing. Vehicles were thrown, trees were uprooted, and power poles were knocked down, cutting off electricity to the city. As a result, doctors were forced to treat the injured in the dark. The tornado killed 12 people and injured 120 others.
- May 28, 1992 – A nighttime F3 tornado struck the town of Santa Lúcia, in Paraná, causing severe destruction. Trees and power poles were brought down, and nearly the entire municipality was devastated. Four people were killed as a result of the tornado.
- May 11, 1993 – Six tornadoes were catalogued by IPMET in the state of Paraná. The affected municipalities were: Capitão Leônidas Marques, Irati, Rebouças, Cantagalo, Dois Vizinhos, and Lindoeste. None of the tornadoes have been classified.
- May 13, 1994 – A strong F2 tornado struck the city of Ribeirão Preto, in São Paulo, accompanied by intense hail. The tornado brought down trees, crushed vehicles, and knocked down concrete walls. It also caused damage to a hospital and several industries. Three people were killed as a result of the tornado.
- May 14, 1994 – An F0 tornado struck the town of Bauru, in São Paulo.
- May 14, 1994 – Several reports indicated a funnel on the ground, causing destruction over the city of Ribeirão Preto, in São Paulo.
- January 9, 1995 – An unrated tornado struck the town of Viamão, in Rio Grande do sul.
- January 9, 1995 – An unrated tornado struck the town of Benedito Novo, in Santa Catarina.
- September 24, 1995 – An unrated tornado struck the town of Paraíso, in Santa Catarina.
- November 27, 1995 – An F1 tornado hit the city of Campinas in São Paulo, destroying the Unicamp convention center.
- November 28, 1995 – An F3 tornado struck the city of Paulínia, in São Paulo, destroying part of the municipality. Deaths were confirmed, but no further information is available.
- November 28, 1995 – An F0 tornado struck the town of Rio dos Cedros, in Santa Catarina.
- January 27, 1996 – A waterspout struck the island of São Francisco do Sul, in Santa Catarina.
- February 27, 1996 – An F1 tornado hit the town of Meleiro, in Santa Catarina.
- July 27, 1996 – A waterspout struck the island of São Francisco do Sul, in Santa Catarina.
- February 2, 1997 – A waterspout struck the town of Itapoá, in Santa Catarina.
- February 7, 1997 – An unrated tornado struck the city of Florianópolis, in Santa Catarina.
- April 5, 1997 – An F1 tornado struck the town of Piçarras, in Santa Catarina.
- June 13, 1997 – Around 4:30 p.m., a violent tornado struck the city of Nova Laranjeiras, in Paraná. About 80% of the city's homes were destroyed, most of them brick. Roofs, walls, windows, and doors were all shattered. More than 600 homes were reduced to rubble, some with their foundations exposed. One resident reported that his house was lifted several meters off the ground and shattered, throwing him 20 meters away (21 yd). The deputy mayor's brick home was completely destroyed, leaving only the supporting pillars. A young man died after being maimed when his house was lifted and destroyed. One house disappeared with a resident inside. Gas stations, markets, and stores suffered severe damage, some completely destroyed. Vehicles were swept more than 100 meters, including a Volkswagen Beetle that was thrown 150 meters (164 yd). A truck floated 100 meters (328 ft) and was thrown into a ravine. A bus was thrown from its parked location and ended up upside down. A mechanic was crushed to death by a car. A young man was thrown 60 meters (65 yd) against a wall and died on impact. A mare was thrown 50 meters (54 yd) and impaled on a tree at a height of 15 meters (49 ft). Trees were uprooted or broken. One image shows a piece of debris stuck in one of the trees, and many were debarked. Power lines were downed, leaving the city without power. The hospital was overwhelmed trying to treat more than 200 injured people, some of them in serious condition. The tornado killed four people and left others missing. The city's mayor stated: "You could say that the city of Nova Laranjeiras was wiped off the map; there are families who haven't even found their furniture." The tornado's classification is debated between F3 and F4. The F4 rating was prioritized due to the fact that most of the damage exceeded the F3 scale.
- August 11, 1997 –An unrated tornado struck the town of Ananindeua, in Pará. A total of 140 homes were affected, with 40 of them destroyed.
- October 28, 1997 –At around 8:05 a.m., a strong tornado hit the town of Itaqui, in Rio Grande do Sul. The tornado lasted 30 minutes and swept through the city in a 400-meter-wide strip, accompanied by an intense and impressive lightning storm. The tornado caused damage to more than 3,000 homes, with 200 of them completely destroyed. Trees were uprooted and poles were knocked down, leaving the city without power and with communication problems. Twenty-seven people were injured, and the tornado was classified as F3.
- February 7, 1998 – An F1 tornado struck the town of Abdon Batista, in Santa Catarina.
- October 4, 1998 – An Unrated tornado struck the town of Francisco Beltrão, in Paraná. Knocking down transmission towers.
- January 31, 1999 – An F2 tornado struck the town of Joinville, in Santa Catarina.
- February 12, 1999 – A short-lived nighttime tornado (F2) struck the industrial area south of the city of Osório, causing serious damage to 3 warehouses, severely damaging wooden houses, uprooting and twisting eucalyptus trees, and destroying a gas station (Buffon 70) that took 2 years to rebuild. There were 2 injuries and no deaths. The damage is consistent with the High-end F3 scale, but there may be other analyses that show why it's F2. The tornado was caused by a high-intensity cold front that hit the state of Rio Grande do Sul.
- November 1, 1999 – A strong tornado struck rural Ponta Porã, in Mato Grosso do Sul. A bus was thrown about 300 meters away (328 yd), resulting in possible fatalities. However, information about the tornado is scarce.
- November 24, 1999 – An F2 tornado struck the town of Forquilhinha, in Santa Catarina. Five houses were completely destroyed.

=== 2000–2009 ===
FU	F0	F1	F2	F3	F4	F5	Total
68	9	21	10	5	2	0	>115
Deaths: ≥15				Injuries: >113			

- March 1, 2000 – A waterspout formed in the city of Itapoá, in Santa Catarina. It advanced towards land, damaging many houses and knocking down power towers.
- October 11, 2000 – An F3 tornado struck the town of Águas Claras(Viamão), in Rio Grande do Sul. The tornado flipped cars and uprooted hundreds of trees. Small aircraft were overturned and damaged, and homes were severely damaged. One resident was so frightened that he built a tornado and storm shelter.
- May 3, 2001 – A waterspout formed in the region of Bacia de Campos, in Rio de Janeiro.
- May 4, 2001 – On the afternoon of this day, a tornado was recorded hitting nine regions in the Campinas area. The cities affected were: Sumaré, Americana, Paulínia, Itatiba, Campinas and Santa Bárbara d'Oeste. The tornado lasted about 5 minutes, uprooting trees, knocking down power lines, tearing off roofs, lifting sidewalks and leaving a large part of the region without electricity. There is a possibility that it was a tornado outbreak, considering the distance between the cities and the short duration. However, it is also possible that it was just a tornado in Sumaré, the most affected city, while the others were affected by severe non-tornado storms. One death was confirmed.
- July 20, 2001 –Three tornadoes were recorded in three municipalities in Rio Grande do Sul: Viamão, Vacaria, and Bom Jesus, where one fatality was reported along with severe damage.
- February 16, 2002 – A waterspout struck the municipality of São Sebastião, in São Paulo.
- September 6, 2002 – A strong tornado struck Canoinhas, Santa Catarina. Trees were uprooted or broken. A brick house was destroyed and thrown 40 meters away. One person died and at least five were injured, one of them seriously.
- September 23, 2002 – Four unclassified tornadoes hit four cities in the interior of the state of São Paulo: Colina, Barretos, Orlândia and São Joaquim da Barra. The tornadoes knocked down trees and power lines, leaving 11 municipalities without electricity.
- October 3, 2002 – A strong F2 tornado struck the town of Cruz Alta, in Rio Grande do Sul, causing damage to 80% of the city.
- November 10, 2002 – A waterspout formed in the town of São Sebastião de Uatumã, in Amazonas.
- July 7, 2003 – A strong F3 tornado struck the city of São Francisco de Paula, in Rio Grande do Sul. The tornado destroyed many homes, debarked and uprooted trees, knocked down power poles, left one person dead and many others injured. Another tornado was seen in Santa Maria.
- December 11, 2003 – A tornado hit the town of Antônio Prado, in Rio Grande do Sul. It was 200 meters wide and traveled 1 km long. The tornado knocked down trees and damaged houses, in addition to tearing off the roof of an elementary school, resulting in 4 deaths. In total, there were 5 deaths and 12 injuries. The tornado was classified as F3.
- January 11, 2004 – An unrated tornado struck the town of Palmares do Sul, in Rio Grande do Sul. The tornado damaged houses and caused trees to fall. Another tornado was recorded in Porto Alegre.
- March 29, 2004 – A waterspout formed in the city of Santos, in São Paulo.
- April 19, 2004 – A tornado(F0) struck the capital of São Paulo, damaging boats and knocking down trees. Another tornado hit the town of Populina.
- May 22, 2004 – A tornado that occurred during the early hours of the morning hit the city of Ribeirão Preto, in São Paulo. Severe damage was reported.
- May 25, 2004 – Three tornadoes occurred in the state of São Paulo. A strong tornado hit the rural area of the city of Palmital. The tornado was 150 meters wide and traveled 16 km (11 miles), lasting 18 minutes. It ripped off the top of a grove of trees, overturned and uprooted sugarcane plants in a 150-meter stretch. A bus was lifted off the ground and thrown 50 meters, with 53 farm workers on board. Two of them died and 50 were injured. An employee who was outside the bus was lifted and thrown to the ground several times, suffering injuries to his face and eyes. Further along the route, another bus was swept away and spun around 360 degrees by the tornado. In addition, four poles, over a distance of about 80 meters, were broken near the ground. A worker 200 meters away from the tornado saw another funnel next to the main one, which came close to touching the ground but returned to the clouds. The Palmital tornado left visible marks of its rotation on the ground during its path. It was classified as F3. A second tornado hit the city of Lençóis Paulista. It destroyed crops and some buildings. This tornado was photographed by a farm worker and was classified as F2. Another tornado hit the city of Itu, but without causing much damage.
- December 19, 2004 – An unrated tornado struck the town of Passo Fundo, in Rio Grande do Sul. The tornado damaged homes and knocked down trees.
- January 2, 2005 – On the afternoon of this day, 2 tornadoes hit the city of Criciuma(Santa Catarina), a strong F2 tornado that destroyed 4 houses, some displaced from their foundations, Trees uprooted and thrown 50 meters from their original location, several twisted and broken trees, Projectiles and roofs thrown more than 80 meters, this tornado killed 1 person, another tornado caused similar damage, in addition to causing the disappearance of some animals, its strength was that of a High-end F1.
- January 2, 2005 – An unrated tornado struck the town of Bertioga, in São Paulo.
- January 5, 2005 – An unrated tornado struck the city of Campinas, in São Paulo.
- January 18, 2005 – An F0 tornado struck the town of Xanxerê, in Santa Catarina, and was seen in an agricultural area.
- March 17, 2005 – An unrated tornado struck an agricultural area in the rural district of Ibitiruna, municipality of Piracicaba, in São Paulo, and was photographed.
- May 4, 2005 – An F3 tornado hit the town of Ilha Comprida, in São Paulo. Any information about damage or victims is unknown.
- May 10, 2005 – A waterspout hits the town of Ubatuba, in São Paulo.
- May 17, 2005 – An unrated tornado struck the town of Engenho Velho, in Rio Grande do Sul. Several homes were damaged, and trees were knocked down.
- May 20, 2005 – Two tornadoes occurred in Rio Grande do Sul: a strong F2 struck the town of São Francisco de Paula, causing intense destruction; another tornado was recorded in Santa Bárbara do Sul.
- May 24, 2005 – That afternoon, at least five tornadoes struck the state of São Paulo, including the Indaiatuba tornado, a multivortex tornado rated as a high-end F3. Earlier that afternoon, a weak tornado struck Indaiatuba, causing minor damage to crops in the rural area. Later, a very strong tornado formed and touched down. The tornado, approximately 200 meters wide, traveled approximately 15 km (9.3 miles), destroying at least 15 industrial plants, throwing vehicles, knocking down transmission towers, breaking or toppling over 200 power poles, and overturning at least 18 parked train cars, each weighing about 25 tons. Three other strong tornadoes struck the cities of Capivari, Bragança Paulista, and Itatiba. The latter was a nighttime tornado that damaged several homes, destroyed some, and overturned a bus, in addition to causing one death. Its strength was estimated at F2. By the end of the outbreak, one person had died and 31 were injured. A curious fact about the Indaiatuba tornadoes is that a photographer, who was photographing the damage caused by the first tornado in the city, managed to capture the second tornado further back in the image.
- June 20, 2005 – An F2 struck the town of Itutinga , in Minas Gerais. Officially classified as F2, but information about damage or casualties is completely unknown.
- June 20, 2005 – An F1 struck the town of Macaé, in Rio de Janeiro. Damaged 6 helicopters at the airport.
- June 22, 2005 – An unrated tornado struck the town of Crissiumal, in Rio Grande do Sul. Accompanied by a lot of hail. It occurred at 4:15 am.
- August 29, 2005 – A violent, long-lasting tornado struck the city of Muitos Capões, in Rio Grande do Sul. The tornado traveled 48.2 km (29.9 mi) and was 290 meters wide. Wooden houses, mixed-construction residences (part wood and part masonry), and masonry public buildings were destroyed. At least 21 buildings were completely destroyed, including three public structures. Three masonry houses with thick walls were obliterated, leaving only the floors, with debris scattered up to 20 meters away. Another 83 buildings suffered damage. A municipal garage was destroyed, and the roof of the city hall was completely torn off. Trees were uprooted or broken, and power poles were knocked down. A vehicle was dragged 60 meters and was completely destroyed. In rural areas, sheds, greenhouses, and silos suffered severe damage, some completely destroyed. Debris and objects were thrown dozens of meters away. The tornado injured 16 people and left 80 homeless. It was officially classified as F3, but reclassified as F4 in December 2025 by Prevots. With winds averaging 370 ± 32 km/h (230 ± 20 mph), due to the throwing of the Volkswagen Beetle, in addition to the destruction of reinforced masonry structures.
- October 10, 2005 – An unrated tornado struck the town of Foz do Iguaçu, in Paraná.
- October 14, 2005 – An F1 tornado struck the town of Ivoti, in Rio Grande do Sul. Several poles and trees were knocked down.
- October 26, 2005 – A waterspout hit the city of Manaus, in Amazonas. It advanced towards the land area and caused minor damage.
- December 16, 2005 – An F1 tornado struck the town of Santo Antônio do Planalto, in Rio Grande do Sul. Trees were broken, walls were knocked down and some homes were partially destroyed.
- December 29, 2005 – An unrated tornado struck the town of São Joaquim, in Santa Catarina. The tornado Destruction of orchards of rural facilities.
- January 1, 2006 – An F1 tornado struck the municipalities of Erebango and Getúlio Vargas, in Rio Grande do Sul. The tornado caused damage to: 36 properties, homes and public buildings, which were completely unroofed. About 100 hectares of soybeans, corn, melons, watermelons, grapevines and tomato plants were damaged.
- January 2, 2006 – An F0 tornado struck the city of Florianópolis, in Santa Catarina.
- January 6, 2006 – An unrated tornado struck the town of Tibagi, in Paraná. Occurrence in an uninhabited area.
- January 8, 2006 – An F0 tornado struck the town of Taubaté, in São Paulo.
- January 24, 2006 – An F1 tornado struck the city of São José dos Campos, in São Paulo. The tornado caused partial or total destruction of industrial warehouses, resulting in 4 injuries, in addition to trees being knocked down.
- February 22, 2006 – An F0 tornado struck the town of Joinville, in Santa Catarina.
- February 24, 2006 – On this day, three tornadoes occurred in Rio Grande do Sul. The cities affected were: Porto Alegre, Mostardas and São Simão. None of them have a classification.
- March 2, 2006 – A waterspout struck the Mundaú river, in Ceará.
- March 23, 2006 – An F1 tornado struck the city of Florianópolis, in Santa Catarina. The tornado left 20 families homeless, 37 homes completely unroofed, trees uprooted and one car overturned. The extent of the damage indicates that the phenomenon approached category F2.
- March 29, 2006 – On this day, four tornadoes occurred in the interior of São Paulo. An F1 tornado hit Piracicaba, affecting the ESALQ campus: it broke greenhouses, tore off the roofs of laboratories and damaged equipment, with 350 thousand tons of sugarcane falling and 2.7 thousand trees damaged. Winds reached 158 km/h (the meter's limit value), but were probably stronger. Three other tornadoes hit Santa Bárbara d'Oeste, two F1 (or even F2) caused one death and severe, widespread destruction, while the other one hit a rural area and was unclassified.
- December 18, 2006 – An unrated tornado struck the town of Carlos Barbosa, in Rio Grande do Sul.
- January 17, 2007 – An F1 tornado struck the town of Promissão, in São Paulo. 150 people homeless. Occurrence during the early hours of the morning.
- February 28, 2007 – An F1 tornado struck the town of Cascavel, in Paraná. Damage to aircraft at the municipality's airport.
- March 2, 2007 – An unrated tornado struck the town of Franca, in São Paulo.
- March 9, 2007 – An F1 tornado struck the town of Peruibe, in São Paulo.
- March 24, 2007 – An unrated tornado struck the town of Tubarão, in Santa Catarina.
- May 5, 2007 – An unrated tornado struck the town of Canoinhas, in Santa Catarina.
- July 29, 2007 – A landspout tornado struck the town of Araguari, in Minas Gerais.
- September 24, 2007 – A tornado tornado struck the town of Ji-Paraná, in Rondonia. The tornado uprooted more than 150 trees, knocked down a radio tower and spread destruction for 2 kilometers. Winds of almost 150 km/h, accompanied by hail and a downburst.

- October 20, 2007 – An F2 tornado tornado struck the town of Ronda Alta, in Rio Grande do Sul. The tornado damaged several homes and knocked down trees and power poles.
- October 27, 2007 – An F2 tornado tornado struck the town of Três de Maio, in Rio Grande do Sul. There is no information about damage.
- October 28, 2007 – An F0 tornado struck the city of Ribeirão Preto, in São Paulo. It felled several tree branches and was accompanied by hail.
- November 1, 2007 – An F0 tornado struck the city of Campinas in São Paulo. The tornado caused several trees to fall, one of which hit a car and resulted in a fatality.
- November 1, 2007 – An F2 tornado struck the town of Três de Maio, in Rio Grande do Sul. The tornado caused extensive damage to multiple homes, toppled trees and power lines, and completely destroyed a church building.
- November 2, 2007 – An F1 tornado struck the town of Guzolândia, in São Paulo. The nighttime tornado ripped off the roofs of several homes, knocked down trees and poles, and destroyed a clothing factory.
- January 5, 2008 – An unrated tornado struck the town of Maquiné, in Rio Grande do Sul.
- January 26, 2008 – A waterspout formed in the town of Morro de São Paulo, in Bahia.
- February 1, 2008 – An unrated tornado struck the town of Papanduva, in Santa Catarina. The tornado destroyed approximately 90% of the crops and damaged several buildings.
- February 16, 2008 – An F1 tornado struck the town of Tubarão, in Santa Catarina. The tornado caused minor damage to a rural home, resulting in one injury.
- April 21, 2008 – An unrated tornado struck the town of Maringá, in Paraná.
- June 10, 2008 – A waterspout struck the town of Santarém, in Pará.
- June 16, 2008 – An unrated tornado struck the city of São Luís, in Maranhão.
- August 28, 2008 – A landspout tornado struck the town of Paranatinga, in Mato Grosso.
- September 5, 2008 – An F1 tornado struck the town of Coxilha, in Rio Grande do Sul. Much damage was recorded.
- September 10, 2008 – Two tornadic events were recorded in Rio Grande do Sul: an F1 tornado in Tabaí (with vehicle damage on BR-386 and falling vegetation) and an unclassified phenomenon in Pareci Novo (with residential roofs being ripped off).
- September 11, 2008 – An F2 tornado struck the town of Mato Leitão, in Rio Grande do Sul. Severe destruction in the village.
- October 24, 2008 – On this day, two tornadoes hit the city of Abelardo Luz(Santa Catarina). The first one hit the rural area, and the second one occurred hours later, causing roofs to be ripped off several homes.
- October 26, 2008 – An unrated tornado struck Canoinhas, Santa Catarina, snapping dozens of trees in half.
- November 6, 2008 – An F0 tornado struck the town of São Gabriel, in Rio Grande do Sul. Observed in a rural area.
- November 15, 2008 – An F1 tornado struck Itupeva, São Paulo, causing serious damage to a nursery school.
- November 11, 2008 – During an event with multiple downbursts, a tornado was confirmed in Cachoeira Paulista (São Paulo), after leaving a characteristic trail of destruction in its path.
- November 17, 2008 – On this day, two wide waterspouts were observed off Ilha Comprida, São Paulo.
- December 10, 2008 – An unrated tornado struck the town of Sidrolândia, in Mato Grosso do Sul.
- December 25, 2008 – An F1 tornado struck Lins, São Paulo, uprooting small trees and snapping others in a rural area.
- December 31, 2008 – An unrated tornado struck the town of Urupema, in Santa Catarina.
- January 31, 2009 – An unrated tornado struck the town of Sombrio, Santa Catarina.
- March 8, 2009 – Two tornadoes occurred in Santa Catarina. One tornado struck the town of Ponte Alta, damaging more than 50 homes. Another tornado hit the town of Turvo, damaging around 50 homes. Two poultry farms were completely destroyed, and power poles fell.
- June 20, 2009 – A waterspout formed in the city of Rio de Janeiro, in Rio de Janeiro.

Tornadoes confirmed in southern and southeast Brazil on September 7, 2009
Date	F/EF#	Deaths	Injuries	Location
September 7, 2009	F4	4	74	Guaraciaba(SC)
Around 9 p.m., an extremely violent tornado caused total destruction, from houses to trees. It hit more than five communities in Guaraciaba, some of them with severe damage. One house was thrown more than 50 meters, with its residents inside, resulting in injuries. Another house was also thrown about 50 meters, with a woman inside, resulting in her death. A resident reported seeing his neighbor's cows spinning along with the funnel. A refrigerator was thrown more than 100 meters. Another resident had his house completely destroyed, with the debris falling more than 50 meters away. He was sucked into the tornado and thrown 70 meters, but survived. A house, partially made of wood and the rest of masonry, was lifted off the ground, with its residents displaced about 150 meters away. The resident of the house reported that even the floorboards were missing. Many houses were left with only the bathroom standing, and others were completely destroyed. The church was completely destroyed. Eucalyptus plantations of up to three hectares were wiped off the map. Trees were violently cut, snapped, and twisted, many uprooted. Poultry farms were completely destroyed. A photo was found 240 km away, in the municipality of Aratiba, Rio Grande do Sul. The tornado killed four people, injured more than 70, and was described as: "You can see the path of the tornado and how it destroyed everything in its path. It looks like television scenes, like wartime bombings. I've never seen anything like it before," reported the city's police chief after watching aerial footage. Furthermore, the tornado caused an estimated 160 million reais (R$ in 2009). Classified as an F3 by a meteorologist/researcher at the University of São Paulo (USP), However, there is consensus among meteorologists that it was a violent F4 category tornado. The damage suggests a low-end F4, with damage that could be considered mid-F4. There is only one wide trail in Guaraciaba, caused by a single tornado, not three; that is, only one tornado occurred in the city. The tornado arose when the supercell was in a state of occlusion, shortly after generating the F4+ tornado in San Pedro, Misiones, Argentina. The San Pedro tornado caused damage consistent with that of a low-end F5 tornado, violently uprooting hardwood trees, causing groundscouring visible even in low-resolution satellite imagery, and leaving some victims unrecognizable.
September 7, 2009	FU	0	~1	Salto Veloso(SC)
Severe tornado, damage to crops and forest areas, death of animals, destruction of some homes, 200 people affected, 3 homeless and 22 displaced.
September 7, 2009	FU	0	25	Santa Cecília(SC)
A strong tornado affected 2,000 people, resulting in 50 homeless, 10 displaced, 60 displaced and 383 buildings severely damaged.
September 7, 2009	FU	0	~1	Macieira(SC)
A strong tornado caused damage to forested areas, tore off roofs, and damaged or destroyed over 50 homes, resulting in 6 people being homeless and 20 being displaced.
September 7, 2009	FU	0	~14	Primeiro de Maio(PR)
A tornado uprooted dozens of eucalyptus trees and caused destruction during an event, injuring 14 people.
September 7, 2009	FU	0	0	Echaporã,Platina(SP)
The tornado caused large trees to fall, with some being uprooted, and also damaged vegetation, as confirmed by IPMET.

- September 27, 2009 – An F1 tornado struck the town of Araranguá, in Santa Catarina.
- October 14, 2009 – Two tornadoes occurred in Paraná. One of them struck the town of Ampére, causing intense destruction in the rural area of the municipality, and one death was recorded. Another tornado hit the city of Cascavel.
- October 14, 2009 – An F2 tornado hit Pontão and Espumoso, two municipalities in Rio Grande do Sul, causing intense destruction over a width of 400 meters.
- November 27, 2009 – An F0 tornado struck the city of Londrina, in Paraná.

=== 2010–2019 ===
FU	F0	F1	F2	F3	F4	F5	Total
68	9	17	20	6	1	0	> 120
Deaths: ~34				Injuries: >508			

- January 23, 2010 – A waterspout struck the town of Ubatuba, in São Paulo.
- March 7, 2010 – A waterspout struck the town of Barra Velha, in Santa Catarina.
- March 9, 2010 – An unrated tornado struck the city of Cidade Ocidental, in Goiás. The tornado tore off roofs, knocked down small light poles, and threw 2 cars (~50 m). The suggested classification would be from a low-end F2 to mid-end F2.
- April 26, 2010 – An F1 tornado struck the city of Dourados, in Mato Grosso do Sul. A gas station had its roof twisted, and several houses were unroofed or destroyed due to trees being knocked down.
- July 22, 2010 – An F2 tornado struck the cities of Gramado and Canela, in Rio Grande do Sul. The tornado damaged 407 homes, with 81 of them destroyed, violently uprooted poles and trees, left approximately 200 people homeless and injured 12 people.
- October 7, 2010 – An unrated tornado struck the town of Juara, in Mato Grosso. The tornado twisted the metal roof of a gas station.
- November 24, 2010 – An F2 tornado struck the town of Caçador, in Santa Catarina. The tornado damaged 40% of rural properties, caused total damage to crops, broke trees and uprooted some.
- December 5, 2010 – A landspout(F0) tornado struck the city of Uberlândia, in Minas Gerais.
- December 13, 2010 – A gustnado struck Campinas, in São Paulo, overturning cars and causing intense destruction. It was referred to as a gustnado, but its destruction is compatible with that of a tornado.
- January 3, 2011 – An FU struck the town of Guarapuava, in Paraná. The tornado destroyed a gas station and tore the roofs off 42 homes.
- January 12, 2011 – An FU struck the town of Sombrio, in Santa Catarina. The tornado tore off houses and knocked down trees, and was accompanied by large hail.
- January 19, 2011 – An F1 struck the town of Nova Iguaçu, in Rio de Janeiro. Heavy damage in the affected area.
- April 2, 2011 – An F1 struck the town of Vilhena, in Rondonia. Houses were unroofed, walls were knocked down, trees were uprooted and a 2 km (1.2 mi) swath of damage was left.
- June 26, 2011 – A landspout(FU) tornado struck the city of Mogi-Mirim, in São Paulo.
- December 14, 2011 – On this day 3 waterspouts were seen in the cities of Capivari do Sul(1) and Arambaré(2).
- December 31, 2011 – An F1 tornado struck the town of Erechim, in Rio Grande do Sul. Houses were unroofed, entire walls were knocked down and furniture was lifted into the air. A brick house was almost completely destroyed. Trees were knocked down and crops destroyed.
- January 20, 2012 – An F0 tornado struck the town of Santa Margarida do Sul, in Rio Grande do Sul.
- July 20, 2012 – An F2 tornado struck the town of Santa Bárbara do Sul, in Rio Grande do Sul. The tornado destroyed 40 percent of the city, ripped off part of the roof of the school, and shingles were thrown onto nearby trees. 200 homes were damaged and 10 were destroyed. Ten people suffered minor injuries.
- November 1, 2012 –A tornado (FU) in Cândido Mota(São Paulo) destroyed several poles, trees, and transmission towers in the countryside.
- December 2, 2012 – An F3 tornado struck the city of Ponte Alta, Santa Catarina. The tornado damaged approximately 1,900 homes, with damage ranging from minor to severe. One home had its heavy door thrown into the living room, the bathroom roof was ripped off, and the structure suffered severe damage, almost completely destroyed. Another home, measuring 750 square meters and largely built of masonry, was completely destroyed. The entire house was thrown into the air, and two cars were buried under the rubble. There was also damage to agricultural areas, and the loss exceeded 30 million reais (BRL in 2012). One person was injured and 20 were left homeless.
- January 17, 2013 – a tornado was seen between the municipalities of Encruzilhada do Sul and Pântano Grande, in Rio Grande do Sul. A waterspout was seen in the town of Tapes.
- March 3, 2013 –A landspout (F1) struck Limeira in (São Paulo). A ranch on a farm was destroyed. A wooden beam, 4 meters long, was broken in half by the wind, which also carried away the roof tiles.
- April 4, 2013 – A short-lived but violent tornado hit the town of Redentora, in Rio Grande do Sul. 45 houses were unroofed and fifteen were completely destroyed, including solid masonry houses, many with only the floor remaining. One house was lifted 25 meters off the ground, and its floor ended up 50 meters away. Household appliances such as refrigerators and stoves were thrown into the middle of the field, a long distance away. A school and a health center also had their roofs ripped off by the force of the wind. Fifteen people were injured, some with exposed fractures.
- May 3, 2013 – An F2 tornado struck the town of Canguçu, in Rio Grande do Sul. Severe damage to vegetation. Classified as F2 by MetSul Meteorologia.
- September 22, 2013 – A violent rain-wrapped tornado struck the city of Taquarituba, in São Paulo. The tornado uprooted trees, destroyed crops, unroofed houses and even completely destroyed some. A gas station was also destroyed. Silos were damaged and businesses suffered severe losses. Trucks and buses were overturned. A bus was swept away by the wind, overturned and ended up dozens of meters away, resulting in one death. Industries were also damaged and some brick buildings suffered severe damage. The roof of a gymnasium collapsed, resulting in another death. The gymnasium's walls collapsed and its metal structures were violently twisted. By the end of the tornado, two people had died and sixty-six were injured. The tornado was filmed from several angles and its classification is cited as F2 to F3.
- October 21, 2013 – A tornado(FU) struck the town of Chopinzinho, in Paraná. Several homes damaged. Warehouses destroyed.
- October 24, 2013 – A tornado(FU) struck the town of Aral Moreira, in Mato Grosso do Sul.
- December 5, 2013 – On this day, two tornadoes occurred in Santa Catarina, both classified as F1. One of them hit Canoinhas, knocking down trees and destroying warehouses. Some brick houses suffered severe damage. One person was seriously injured after a supermarket was destroyed, indicating that the tornado possibly reached the F2 scale. Another tornado hit the town of Bom Jardim da Serra, knocking down trees and uprooting them. Some were snapped. At least 200 pine trees were uprooted and 50 houses were damaged. The city's health clinic and Social Welfare Department were also destroyed. A projectile was violently embedded in a car tire, and poles were broken. The F1 classification may have been underestimated. The first tornado caused five injuries.
- February 2, 2014 – An F2 tornado struck the town of Taim(Cerrito and Santa Maria), in Rio Grande do Sul, The tornado caused complete roofing of homes, some with severe damage and partial collapses. A storage silo was completely destroyed.
- February 24, 2014 – On this day, four waterspouts were seen over the city of Guaíba. A supposed tornado was spotted in Nova Petrópolis, but it closely resembled a scud cloud.
- March 16, 2014 –a tornado hit the municipalities of São Gabriel and Cacequi. The tornado tore off the roofs of houses; solid masonry buildings suffered total or partial structural collapse, with one of them being destroyed. Trees were uprooted and trunks were severed. Classified as F1 by Metsul.
- April 8, 2014 –A tornado(FU) struck the town of Taquari. Vegetation with cut trees.
- April 12, 2014 – On this day, three tornadoes occurred. A tornado hit the urban area of the city of Erebango, causing extensive destruction, with 200 houses having their structures damaged. One of the houses collapsed completely, and another was left with only its foundations. Boards flew off the houses and got stuck in pine trees, vehicles were overturned, and trees and power poles were knocked down. One person died and 26 were injured. Another tornado, with a width estimated at between 250 and 300 meters, caused severe damage in the urban area of Tapejara, damaging hundreds of houses and destroying a gymnasium. A truck was thrown into a house, and a car was overturned. A third tornado hit the rural area of Soledade, causing extensive damage, a house collapsed, a metal door was found about a 1 km(1093 yd) away from its original position, and trees were uprooted. All were classified between F1 and F2 by MetSul, but most of the damage exceeded these categories.
- July 3, 2014 – A tornado struck the town of Ibarama, in Rio Grande do Sul. The tornado was accompanied by heavy hail, tearing off the roofs of houses, warehouses and stores in the city; it tore off more than 110 power poles; trees (cypresses) were uprooted; the structure of the city's gas station was twisted and torn off. A carpentry shop in the city had half of its structure collapsed. A man lost control of his vehicle and overturned. An 11-ton truck was lifted and thrown 5 meters. The tornado was classified as F0 to F1 by Metsul.
- July 4, 2014 – A tornado struck the town of Rosario do Sul, in Rio Grande do Sul. The tornado blew off roofs, knocked down fences, damaged farm machinery and uprooted trees or snapped them in half.
- August 30, 2014 – A tornado struck the town of Restinga Seca, in Rio Grande do Sul. The tornado occurred in a rural area and damaged 40 houses, with some being completely destroyed.
- September 20, 2014 – An FU tornado occurred between the municipalities of Pedro Osório and Capão do Leão, In Rio Grande do Sul. Observed by a journalist in an uninhabited area.
- September 21, 2014 – A waterspout struck Cidreira in Rio Grande do Sul.
- September 24, 2014 – An F1 tornado struck the town of Porto Murtinho, In Mato Grosso do Sul. The tornado capsized a boat carrying 27 people, resulting in the death of 3 people and 11 missing.
- October 1, 2014 – A landspout(F0) struck Brasilia. Downburst from a bow-echo (96 km/h) produced some damage at the international airport.
- October 30, 2014 – An F0 struck the town of Urubici in Santa Catarina. Roofless homes and felled trees.
- January 1, 2015 – An unrated tornado struck Irani in Santa Catarina. The tornado knocked down trees and unroofed houses.
- January 20, 2015 – A Landspout (FU) struck Pérola in Paraná. The tornado Collapsed the walls of a laundry built with masonry, resulting in one death and 14 injuries.
- April 20, 2015 – That afternoon, two tornadoes struck Santa Catarina. One of them, wedge-shaped, hit the urban area of the city of Xanxerê, being enveloped in rain for most of its path. It caused damage to 2,188 homes, some completely destroyed; 9 public facilities were damaged or destroyed; 38 businesses reported total or partial damage. An analysis was conducted and published in July of that same year. This analysis classified the tornado as F2 (high-end) because the destroyed houses were poorly constructed and anchored, as was the case of a house that was displaced by 10 meters (11 yd). Another house was completely obliterated. However, nearby power poles remained partially intact and standing. A large truck was overturned and dragged. The walls of a gymnasium collapsed, although it had no internal walls, only external ones, which prevented classification as F3. A radar, 7 km away (4,3 mi), recorded winds of approximately 84 km/h. This resulted in an estimated wind speed of 250 km/h (155 mph). Television reports showed further damage, such as power poles violently twisted, broken, or torn from the ground. The overturned truck may have been thrown, as the owner reported that there was no evidence that the vehicle had been rolled over and dragged. However, this damage is still consistent with a high-end F2. The tornado caused 4 deaths and approximately 140 injuries. It was considered the best-documented tornado in images in Brazil, but the one in Rio Bonito do Iguaçu (Paraná, 2025) possibly has more records. Another tornado hit the city of Passos Maia, causing extensive destruction. It was classified as F1.
- April 25, 2015 – An unrated tornado struck the city of Chapada dos Guimarães, in Mato Grosso. It was observed in rural áreas.
- July 13, 2015 – On the afternoon of this day, two tornadoes struck Paraná. In the municipality of Francisco Beltrão, a tornado destroyed wooden and masonry houses. A brick house was left with only the floor remaining. A truck was thrown about 50 meters and suffered violent damage to its body. The tornado injured 19 people, and Simepar classified it between F2 and F3. In November 2024, a meteorologist from PREVOTS shared on his Twitter the estimate of the wind speed necessary for the truck to be lifted. According to him, the estimated winds were 380 km/h (236 mph). That is, the tornado possibly reached an intensity of F4 in the KM 8 community. However, no article has yet been published on the reclassification. Another tornado occurred in the city of Mariópolis, destroying 30 houses and damaging others, resulting in 50 injuries.
- September 10, 2015 – A tornado crossed cities in 2 states: São Paulo and Mato Grosso do Sul. The tornado began as a waterspout in the municipality of Brasilândia (MS), sucking up a lot of water. It then moved onto dry land and hit the rural area, where it caused no damage, moving to the urban area of the municipality of Panorama (SP), where it caused damage to houses: zinc roof tiles were found 500 meters away (546 yd), walls were knocked down and some houses were almost completely destroyed. Light and heavy vehicles were overturned. The tornado was classified as F2, resulting in more than 20 injuries.
- October 10, 2015 – An F0 tornado struck Cafelândia in Paraná. A poultry farm was destroyed, resulting in the death of 15,000 birds.
- November 10, 2015 – On this day, two tornadoes occurred in Rio Grande do Sul. One of them hit the city of São Borja: more than fifty power poles were knocked down, dozens of houses were unroofed and twenty of them were destroyed. A storage structure was also destroyed, and large trees were knocked down. Another tornado occurred in the town of Tuparendi, causing destruction of crops and unroofing of houses.
- November 19, 2015 – On the afternoon of this day, four tornadoes occurred in the South of Brazil. A violent multi-vortex wedge hit Marechal Cândido Rondon, in the state of Paraná. Large trees were uprooted. A truck was overturned. Concrete and iron structures suffered severe damage. Power poles were uprooted or broken. Approximately 1,500 houses were hit, many of them roofless and some destroyed. Twenty people were injured, with one in serious condition. The tornado was classified as F2. Another tornado, also classified as F2, hit the municipality of Alpestre, in the state of Rio Grande do Sul. Power poles were knocked down and trees were uprooted. Houses suffered damage; one of them was destroyed. Three people were injured. In addition, two tornadoes occurred in the state of Santa Catarina. An F2 (high-end) tornado hit Chapecó. Trees were knocked down. Trucks were overturned. A car was dragged for 50 meters. Heavy equipment, such as a washing machine, was also carried away by the force of the wind. The roof of an entire condominium of affordable housing was destroyed. Homes were damaged; some were destroyed. Four people were injured. A tornado classified as F0 hit the municipality of Treze Tílias, resulting in roofs being ripped off houses; no one was injured.
- December 8, 2015 – An unrated tornado struck São José do Xingu in Mato Grosso. The tornado was observed in a village.
- December 18, 2015 – An F1 tornado struck Canoas in Rio Grande do Sul. The wind tore off the structure of a building. A concrete pillar fell. Buildings were unroofed.
- March 13, 2016 –A waterspout struck the town of Luís Correia, in Piauí.
- April 24, 2016 – A multi-vortex F2 tornado struck the municipality of São Miguel das Missões, in Rio Grande do Sul. One hundred homes were damaged. The municipal hospital suffered damage to its roof. The city's historical museum also suffered damage. Centuries-old trees were uprooted. Eight people were injured.
- May 15, 2016 – On this day, 2 tornadoes occurred in the state of Santa Catarina, both classified as F2. One tornado hit Ponte Alta do Norte. Six houses were partially destroyed and another eight were completely destroyed. Trees were uprooted. In total, three people died and twenty were injured. Another tornado hit the city of Porto União. A truck was overturned. Animals were killed. Homes were damaged, resulting in 1 death. Both tornadoes were initially classified as microbursts; however, they were reclassified as tornadoes after damage analysis. However, some damage indicates two F3 tornadoes.
- June 1, 2016 – An unrated tornado struck Congonhal, in Minas Gerais. A house was unroofed and had cracks in the walls. A tractor and other farm equipment were damaged. Two sheds were destroyed. A metal roof was thrown away.
- June 5, 2016 – In the early morning hours of that day, at least three tornadoes struck the state of São Paulo. One of them passed through the city of Campinas, in the urban area. Cars were swept away, trees were uprooted, power poles were knocked down and twisted, and several houses suffered structural damage. The phenomenon was classified as an F3, mainly because it hit middle and upper-class neighborhoods. An F3 tornado hit the city of Jarinu. Two 40-ton trucks were overturned. A gas station was destroyed and became almost unrecognizable. More than fifty commercial establishments were totally or partially destroyed, ten public buildings were damaged, and more than twenty houses suffered damage, resulting in the displacement of forty-five families. One person died and fifty others were injured. However, some sources cite that the fatality was due to a lightning strike, while other sources cite death by collapse caused by the tornado. Another tornado hit the city of São Roque. Houses, wineries, restaurants, and rural properties were destroyed. Trees were uprooted and power poles were knocked down. Cars and a truck were swept away.
- October 20, 2016 – An F1 tornado struck Ponta Grossa, in Paraná. The tornado ripped off the roofs of houses, a gas station and a store. Trees had branches broken. A door of a house was blown off. A car was moved.
- December 7, 2016 – An unrated tornado struck Aral Moreira, in Mato Grosso do Sul. The tornado was observed in a rural area.
- December 23, 2016 – An F1 tornado hit the municipality of Nova iguaçu, in Rio de Janeiro. Classified by the Civil Defense of Nova Iguaçu, the tornado lasted less than 5 minutes, but caused serious damage to the Cerâmica neighborhood, including uprooting more than 20 trees.
- December 27, 2016 – An F0 tornado hit the municipality of Rodeio, in Santa Catarina. Several buildings were partially destroyed.
- January 25, 2017 – A waterspout struck Laguna in Santa Catarina.
- January 25, 2017 – An unrated tornado struck Capivari do Sul, in Rio Grande do Sul. The tornado damaged homes, grain storage silos and public buildings (basic health unit, school and school gym).
- February 18, 2017 – A landspout(F0) hit the municipality of São Miguel Arcanjo, in São Paulo. The wind caused minor damage to sheds, resulting in 1 injury.
- March 8, 2017 – On March 7, 2017, On March 7, 2017, a tornado struck the municipality of Imbé (RS), mainly affecting the beach resorts of Imara and Santa Terezinha. Based on the observed damage, the event is classified as F1 at the upper limit of the Fujita scale by Defesa Civil, with estimated winds close to 180 km/h.

- March 12, 2017 – A tornado struck São Francisco de Paula, in Rio Grande do Sul. The tornado destroyed three hundred houses and damaged the structure of others, leaving more than 1,400 people homeless. Trees and utility poles were knocked down. A gymnasium and a church were destroyed; both were made of masonry. The tornado was classified as F1 by Metsul, because the houses were made of wood. However, the classification was completely underestimated, as this does not explain the masonry houses with collapsed walls and other destroyed buildings. One person died and eighty-seven others were injured. The loss was 21 million (BRL in 2017).
- April 29, 2017 – An unrated tornado hit a community in Santarém(Pará). The tornado knocked down the church, houses, trees and the community school was completely destroyed.
- May 17, 2017 – An unrated tornado hit the municipality of Água Clara, in Mato Grosso do Sul. The tornado knocked down eighteen power transmission towers and twisted them, resulting in five injuries. A gas station suffered serious damage.
- June 6, 2017 – An unrated tornado hit reached the municipalities of Rio Branco do Ivaí and Rosário do Ivaí, in Paraná. The tornado knocked down several power lines and trees. A gymnasium of sports was completely destroyed. Some houses were unroofed and others were destroyed. Several animals were killed. The tornado can be classified as an F2 (high-end) or F3 (low-end).
- June 7–8, 2017 – Between the evening and early morning of June 7 and 8, eleven tornadoes occurred in Rio Grande do Sul. Late in the evening of the 7th, a tornado struck the municipality of Erebango, traveling 10.7 km (6.64 mi) and causing minor damage. On the 8th, another tornado, which traveled 18.8 km (11.6 mi), struck the municipalities of Maratá, São José do Sul, Harmonia and Brochier, causing severe damage to brick homes. One house was completely destroyed and its furniture was thrown into the yard, with the resident found 20 meters away. Trees were uprooted. A truck was overturned. Eight people were injured. Another tornado caused similar damage in Vila Oliveira (Caxias do Sul), resulting in 1 death and 115 homeless people. Another tornado, which traveled 9.4 km (5.8 mi), struck the municipalities of Charrua and Tapejara, causing similar damage to the previous ones. Others occurred in Soledade & Espumoso, Veranópolis, São Sebastião do Caí, Fontoura Xavier, Barros Cassal and Capão Bonito do Sul, causing light to significant damage. By the end of the outbreak, 4 people had died and dozens were injured. The purpose of the study was only to document the tracks. However, it is possible to estimate the Maratá tornado as a low-end F4 at its maximum peak, and the Vila Oliva (Caxias do Sul) tornado as an F3.
- August 11, 2017 – A landspout(FU) hit Guarantã do Norte, in Mato Grosso. It was observed in a rural area.
- October 2, 2017 – An F1 tornado struck Pato Branco, in Paraná. The tornado ripped off the roofs of eighty houses. A 150-square-meter shed was destroyed. Huge trees were snapped in half.
- November 21, 2017 – A landspout(F0) struck Cristalina in Goiás.
- January 6, 2018 – A tornado struck Toledo in Paraná. A pig shed was destroyed. A shed where agricultural machinery was stored was also destroyed. The tornado was classified as F1, with winds of 179 km/h (111 mph) picked up by radar, which puts it close to the F2 category.
- June 11–12, 2018 – Between the late afternoon of the 11th and the early morning of the 12th, 11 tornadoes occurred between northern Argentina and Rio Grande do Sul. Ten of them struck Rio Grande do Sul, including tornadoes ranging from F2 to F4 (the classification is debated). Around 11:00 PM on the 11th, an F3 tornado struck the municipality of Sarandi, resulting in roofless houses, a completely destroyed wooden house, and an overturned truck, in addition to the destruction of exterior walls of well-constructed masonry houses. In the early morning of the 12th, a violent tornado struck the municipalities of Coxilha, Vila Lângaro, Água Santa, and Ciríaco. Trucks were overturned, and a 14-ton truck was thrown into a nearby field. The exterior concrete walls of one house collapsed, and many fragile wooden houses were completely destroyed. Light projectiles were found up to 70 km (43 mi) away. The tornado was classified as F3 by the Federal University of Santa Maria (UFSM) and as F4 by MetSul. Prevots described it as "one of the most intense tornadoes in RS in recent years." The tornado outbreak killed three people and left several injured, including one death in Argentina.
- June 13, 2018 – An unrated tornado struck Ibiúna, in São Paulo. The tornado was captured on video. The city was hit by strong winds, resulting in downed trees and roofs blown off houses. However, the tornado struck an uninhabited area. A downburst caused the damage.
- October 31, 2018 – On this day, two tornadoes occurred in Rio Grande do Sul. One tornado hit the municipalities of Flores da Cunha and São Marcos, causing extensive damage to rural properties. Trees were uprooted and some crops were destroyed. Another tornado hit the municipality of Farroupilha. Several trees and poles were knocked down, and some homes were damaged.
- November 30, 2018 – A tornado struck Itaperuçu in Paraná. Vehicles were thrown some distances. Houses and buildings suffered partial or total roof damage. Walls were collapsed. Power poles were knocked down, causing a power outage. Two people died. The tornado was classified as F1 by Simepar, but Prevots classified it as a high-end EF2/F2.
- February 17, 2019 – A waterspout struck Santarém in Pará. Houses and buildings were unroofed.
- February 25, 2019 – A waterspout struck Guaíba in Rio Grande do Sul. It was filmed by fishermen.
- February 26, 2019 – An unrated tornado struck Campo Grande in Mato Grosso do Sul. It was filmed by a resident. There was no visible condensation, but you can see tiles and debris spinning in the air.
- March 5, 2019 – An unrated tornado struck Rio Grande in Rio Grande do Sul. It was observed in a rural and uninhabited area. No damage was reported.
- March 9, 2019 – An unrated tornado struck Chupinguaia in Rondonia. Observed in rural areas. Registered by PREVOTS.
- May 30, 2019 – An unrated tornado struck Santa Maria do Oeste in Paraná. A warehouse was destroyed and trees were uprooted.
- November 30, 2019 – A landspout struck Vicentina in Mato Grosso do sul. No damage was reported.

=== 2020–present ===
FU	F0	F1	F2	F3	F4	F5	Total
56	57	22	11	3	4	0	146
Deaths: 8				Injuries: >896			

- January 2, 2020 – A waterspout struck Bragança in Pará. It advanced onto the land, destroying tents and taking chairs.
- January 7, 2020 – A short-lived tornado(FU) struck Cambé in Paraná. Businesses and homes were damaged. Trees were knocked down.
- January 22, 2020 – A landspout(FU) struck Salvador in Bahia. Part of a university roof was ripped off.
- January 27, 2020 – An unrated tornado struck Dourados in Mato Grosso do sul. Trees were uprooted and several houses were unroofed.
- February 5, 2020 – A waterspout struck Três Marias in Minas Gerais. Captured in photos by people on site.
- February 25, 2020 – An unrated tornado struck Serranópolis do Iguaçu in Paraná. A shed was destroyed and some of its fragments were found 300 meters away (328 yd). Some trees also fell and were twisted. Animals were killed.
- February 25, 2020 – An F1 tornado struck Camargo in Rio Grande do Sul. Commercial warehouses and roofs of hundreds of homes were destroyed.
- March 4, 2020 – A waterspout struck Balneário Camboriú in Santa Catarina. Recorded on video by internet users.
- April 17, 2020 – A supercell waterspout (F1) hit the cities of Cidreira and Tramandaí, causing damage to fishing vessels and some beachfront houses. The event is remembered by Metsul, which called it "The Day of the Waterspouts" because more than 30 waterspouts were sighted on the coast of Rio Grande do Sul.
- April 23, 2020 – A landspout (F0) tornado struck Serra do Mel in Rio Grande do Norte. No damage was reported.
- June 10, 2020 – On this day, 2 tornadoes occurred in Santa Catarina. One tornado hit the municipality of São Miguel do Oeste. The tornado was small and short-lived. recorded in photos in the rural area. Another tornado hit the municipalities of Belmonte and Descanso. Some solidly built homes were reduced to the ground. A truck was overturned. The tornado was classified between F1 and F2 by Metsul.
- June 30, 2020 – On this day, four tornadoes occurred in Santa Catarina. One tornado hit Florianópolis. The roof of a building was "sucked off", and was then completely destroyed. Later, another tornado hit the city again, but caused little damage. Two other tornadoes hit the cities of Papanduva and Rio do Sul, causing trees to fall and minor damage.
- July 13, 2020 – A rain-wrapped tornado struck São Luís, in Maranhão. A transmission tower was knocked down. Homes, buildings, commercial establishments and churches were unroofed.
- August 14, 2020 – On this day, two tornadoes occurred in Santa Catarina. A huge, rain-wrapped, wedge-shaped tornado measuring nearly a mile long struck the cities of Água Doce and Tangará. 700 homes were damaged, 25 of which were completely destroyed. A brick house was completely destroyed, even the bathroom was demolished. A small portion of the foundation was ripped off, and some debris was vaporized. A freezer weighing approximately 400 kg (881 lb), considering its weight and that of the items inside, was thrown 100 meters away (109 yd). The occupants of the house were thrown 50 meters (54 yd), resulting in one person being injured. Large trees were snapped or uprooted, and a truck was overturned. The tornado was classified as EF3 by Prevots meteorologist. Another tornado hit Irineópolis. Homes, warehouses, and greenhouses were destroyed, and trees were cut in half. The tornado was recorded on video and classified as F2. After the tornadoes ended, 16 were injured, two of them seriously. 830 were left homeless and 125 were displaced.
- November 26, 2020 – A waterspout struck Rio Amazonas (Macapá) in Amapá. It was observed and recorded by dozens of people.
- December 1, 2020 – A landspout (FU) struck Terra Rica in Paraná. It was observed in the rural area.
- December 13, 2020 – A landspout (FU) struck Anicuns in Goias. It was observed by local residents.
- February 12, 2021 – An unrated tornado struck Camaquã in Rio Grande do Sul. No damage or injuries were reported.
- February 14, 2021 – Twin waterspouts formed in Mostardas, in Rio Grande do Sul. No damage reported.
- March 6, 2021 – A multi-vortex tornado struck Rio da casca (Chapada dos Guimarães) in Mato Grosso. Observed and recorded by a storm chaser.
- March 24, 2021 – A landspout(FU) struck Castro in Paraná. It was seen in a rural area.
- April 22, 2021 – A waterspout formed between the municipalities of Bujaru and Inhangapi, in Pará. Only one commercial point suffered losses.
- May 28, 2021 – An unrated tornado struck Campos Novos in Santa Catarina. Damage was caused to 288 homes, 20 industries and a school. 1,700 people were affected by the tornado. Two people were injured.
- May 31, 2021 – A Landspout (FU) struck Bom Jesus de Goiás in Goiás. It did not cause any damage as it occurred on uninhabited land.
- September 13, 2021 – An unrated tornado struck Guatambu in Santa Catarina. Houses were unroofed and trees were broken.
- September 20, 2021 – An F1 tornado struck Seara in Santa Catarina. Trees were broken or felled.
- September 21, 2021 – An unrated tornado struck Irani in Santa Catarina. Trees were broken, uprooted or twisted.
- October 20, 2021 – A landspout (FU) struck Vilhena in Rondônia. Roofs of houses and sheds were ripped off.
- October 27, 2021 – A landspout (FU) struck Marialva in Paraná. Houses suffered severe roof damage.
- November 26, 2021 – A F1 tornado struck Duartina in São Paulo. Houses were unroofed. A car, a livestock trailer and a tractor trailer overturned. Confirmed by Prevots.
- November 27, 2021 – A F0 tornado formed in Volta Redonda in Rio de Janeiro during a thunderstorm and hail. Roof tiles were pulled off.
- December 13, 2021 – A tornado (FU) struck Ibiraiaras in Rio Grande do Sul. Several trees were cut down.
- January 10, 2022 – A Landspout (FU) struck Matões in Maranhão. No damage was reported.
- April 13, 2022 – A waterspout struck Penha in Santa Catarina. No damage was reported.
- May 29, 2022 – An F0 tornado struck Campo Alegre in Santa Catarina. 100 houses and 12 sheds were left without roofs.
- May 29, 2022 – An unrated tornado struck Palmeira in Paraná. The building of an agricultural school was unroofed. Confirmed by PREVOTS.
- June 22, 2022 – An unrated tornado struck Concórdia in Santa Catarina. At least 50 homes and rural properties were damaged, with roofs being the most common damage. Estimated loss of 10 million (BRL in 2022).
- September 17, 2022 – On the afternoon of the same day, two landspouts occurred in Brasília. One of them occurred in Samambaia: several properties were damaged and houses were left with their roofs unroofed. Another landspout caused similar damage, also in Samambaia. The events were classified as F0 to F1, according to Metsul.
- September 20, 2022 – Twin waterspouts struck Macapá in Amapá. Recorded on video by locals.
- November 4, 2022 – An unrated tornado struck Bonito in Pernambuco. It was cited as a funnel cloud by newspapers; however, it was confirmed as a tornado by PREVOTS.
- December 6, 2022 – A landspout (FU) struck Planaltina in Brasília. Filmed by local residents. Did not cause any damage.
- January 13, 2023 – An F1 tornado hit the municipalities of Sangão (SC) and Jaguaruna (SC). 15 to 20 homes had partial roof removal. A truck was overturned. Trees were uprooted and the sports gym was structurally compromised.
- January 18, 2023 – A tornado (FU) struck Aral Moreira, in Mato Grosso do Sul. Confirmed by Prevots.
- February 24, 2023 – A tornado (FU) hit Campo Grande, in Mato Grosso do Sul. In a matter of seconds, plastic tables, signs, awnings and several snack boxes from a cafeteria were destroyed. People were dragged a few meters, resulting in three injuries. The tornado was confirmed by Prevots.
- March 3, 2023 – A tornado (FU) struck Campo Alegre, in Santa Catarina. Hundreds of araucaria trees were damaged, uprooted, or felled. No homes were directly affected. The tornado was captured on video.
- March 9, 2023 – A waterspout hit the Lagoa dos Patos, in Rio Grande do Sul. It was observed and recorded by residents. No injuries were reported.
- July 12, 2023 – On this day, two tornadoes struck Rio Grande do Sul. One struck the municipalities of Novo Machado, Doutor Maurício Cardoso, and Horizontina. It traveled 25.4 km (17.7 mi) and was estimated to be 450 meters wide. Trees were downed, and scars were visible on the ground. It was classified as EF2/F2, according to the Tornado Archive. Another tornado traveled 76 km (47,2 mi) and was 1.7 km wide (1,09 mile). It struck the municipalities of Nova Candelária, Humaitá, Sede Nova, Campo Novo, and Coronel Bicaco. Trees were uprooted and others were debarked. Severe damage occurred to rural structures. A school was unroofed, and the gymnasium suffered serious damage. A piece of wood was embedded in a water tank. The damage may have reached 100 million (BRL in 2023). According to the Tornado Archive, the damage is consistent with category F3 or higher. Both tornadoes were shrouded in rain. According to Prevots, it was a family of tornadoes, possibly two to five, with damage suggesting EF2/F2 intensity or higher. The Sede Nova tornado may have reached category EF3/F3, based on the damage recorded. This information was obtained by Prevots and from local broadcasters' YouTube reports. 11 people were injured in Sede Nova.
- September 5, 2023 – A nighttime tornado (FU) struck Santa Cecília, in Santa Catarina. Two houses were destroyed and trees were knocked down.
- October 28, 2023 – An F2 tornado struck São José da Boa Vista in Paraná. A truck was overturned. A cooperative suffered serious damage. It was recorded on video. Classified as F2 by Prevots.
- October 30, 2023 – An unrated tornado struck Luiziana in Paraná. It occurs in uninhabited. It was recorded on video.
- November 2, 2023 – A large wedge tornado struck Eldorado, in Mato Grosso do Sul. It was intercepted by a storm chaser in an uninhabited area. It remained on the ground for 2 minutes and was confirmed by PREVOTS.
- November 3, 2023 – An unrated tornado struck Cunha Porã, in Santa Catarina. Trees, crops and buildings suffered damage.
- November 11, 2023 – An unrated tornado struck Tubarão, in Santa Catarina. Trees were twisted, snapped, or toppled. Power lines were downed. The roof of a warehouse was twisted and part of it ripped off.
- November 14, 2023 – An unrated tornado struck São João Batista, in Santa Catarina. 63 homes and 2 businesses were damaged. Poles were knocked down, in addition to the occurrence of hail.
- November 16, 2023 – On this day, two tornadoes occurred in Santa Catarina. A tornado struck the municipalities of Itá and Seara. Trees were uprooted and eucalyptus trees were twisted. Another tornado struck Guaraciaba. A church was destroyed and 30 houses were unroofed.
- November 18, 2023 – On this day, two tornadoes occurred in Santa Catarina. A tornado struck Urupema. One home was completely destroyed, and others suffered structural damage, with debris being thrown long distances. Trees, including some large ones, were uprooted or toppled. Another tornado occurred in the municipalities of Balneário Gaivota and Sombrio. Homes and buildings suffered partial or complete roof damage, as well as broken trees.
- November 21, 2023 – A landspout struck Taquarussu, in Mato Grosso do Sul. The roof of a shed for storing machinery was destroyed.
- November 28, 2023 – A tornado (F0) struck Rio das Antas, in Santa Catarina. Minor damage in rural areas.
- December 25, 2023 – A tornado (FU) struck Sant'Ana do Livramento (RS). It was recorded in an uninhabited area.
- January 19, 2024 – A short-lived tornado struck rural Mandaguari, Paraná. It was recorded by a storm chaser.
- January 26, 2024 – A waterspout struck Florianópolis in Santa Catarina. It was filmed very close to the coast.
- February 19, 2024 – A tornado struck Júlio de Castilhos, in Rio Grande do Sul. It was confirmed by Civil Defense, but no damage was reported.
- February 22, 2024 – An F1 tornado struck Estrela de Alagoas, in Alagoas. Houses were unroofed and some had their walls collapsed.
- February 26, 2024 – A tornado struck Arraial d'Ajuda (Porto Seguro), in Bahia. Houses were unroofed and some had their walls collapsed.
- March 21, 2024 – A tornado struck São Sepé, in Rio Grande do Sul. The tornado occurred during the early morning hours. A house was destroyed and dislodged from its foundation, resulting in two injuries. The tornado was classified as EF2/F2 by Prevots and UFSM.
- April 5, 2024 – A tornado struck Ponta Grossa, in Paraná. 13 sheds were unroofed. Several trees were affected, including eucalyptus, cedar, and araucaria species, which were uprooted, had their crowns displaced, and branches torn off. The tornado traveled 4 km (2.48 mi), following an irregular path with apparent arcs of destruction, likely indicating a multi-vortex structure. Classified as EF2 by ABR Hidro.
- April 27, 2024 – On this day, three tornadoes occurred in Rio Grande do Sul. A tornado struck the rural area of Cruz Alta; they were observed by storm chasers. Another tornado struck São Martinho da Serra, resulting in damage to rural properties.
- April 29, 2024 – A tornado struck Fortaleza dos Valos, in Rio Grande do Sul. It was seen and photographed by storm chasers in an uninhabited area.
- May 2, 2024 – A tornado (FU) hit the municipalities of Ponte Serrada and Passos Maia. Dozens of eucalyptus trees were toppled and twisted, and some trees were uprooted.
- May 11, 2024 – A tornado struck Gentil, in Rio Grande do Sul. A farm machinery shed was destroyed, and its zinc roofing was found 500 meters away (546 yd). The tornado lasted about 20 minutes and occurred in a rural area. Metsul classified it between F0 and F1.
- May 23, 2024 – A tornado (FU) struck Santa Helena, in Santa Catarina. Dozens of trees were knocked down and sheds were unroofed.
- November 25, 2024 – A landspout (FU) struck Luís Eduardo Magalhães, in Bahia. It was observed in a rural area.
- December 9, 2024 – A tornado struck Nova Santa Rosa, in Paraná. Trees were uprooted and twisted.
- December 16, 2024 – A tornado struck Vale do Rio Pardo (Vale Verde), in Rio Grande do Sul. It did not cause damage as it hit an uninhabited area.
- January 8, 2025 – A tornado struck Formosa do Rio Preto, in Bahia. It was registered by a resident and confirmed by Prevots.
- January 24, 2025 – A waterpout (F0) struck Curuçá, in Pará. It advanced towards the land and caused little damage.
- January 31, 2025 – A tornado (F1) struck a rural area in the Campestre neighborhood, municipality of Piracicaba, in São Paulo, caused by a marginal/weak supercell. It damaged a commercial eucalyptus plantation, causing trunk torsion, stem fractures, widespread defoliation, and debarking.
- March 31, 2025 – A waterpout struck Guaíba, in Rio Grande do Sul. It occurred during a severe weather event with strong winds; at least two waterspouts were recorded.
- May 8–9, 2025 – Between May 8 and 9, five tornadoes struck southern Brazil. On the 8th, two tornadoes were spotted in the rural area of Bossoroca, Rio Grande do Sul, in the early evening. There was no significant damage. On the 9th, a tornado classified as F2 by Prevots struck Erval Grande, also in Rio Grande do Sul. Many properties were affected and damaged, with trees and power lines downed. In Santa Catarina, two tornadoes struck. One struck the city of Palmitos, damaging more than 50 rural properties and downing trees, resulting in one fatality and 65 displaced people. Another tornado struck Santo Amaro da Imperatriz, where homes were damaged, including a mixed-wood and masonry residence that suffered serious damage. Trees were downed, but there were no injuries. A possible tornado may have struck Nova Laranjeiras, Paraná, but has not been confirmed.
- June 3, 2025 – A tornado (FU) struck Kaloré, in Paraná. Caused light to moderate damage to crops. Confirmed by Prevots.
- June 4, 2025 – A tornado (FU) struck Lajeado Grande, in Santa Catarina. It was said to be the beginning of a tornado, but confirmed as a tornado by Civil Defense and Prevots.
- June 22–23, 2025 – Between the night of the day 22nd and the early morning of the 23rd, six tornadoes were confirmed in Santa Catarina. Two to three tornadoes occurred between the municipalities of São José do Cerrito and Lages, causing moderate damage to vegetation, with some trees being downed. Also on the 22nd, the municipalities of Descanso and Belmonte also recorded one tornado each. In both cases, there was severe damage to eucalyptus plantations. Another tornado occurred in Xavantina, causing damage to forested areas. In the early morning of the 23rd, a strong tornado struck Passos Maia. Trees were uprooted or cut and thrown several meters. Power poles were snapped and toppled. Warehouses were completely destroyed. According to Prevots, the tornado was classified as EF2/F2. However, in some parts of its path, damage consistent with intensities above EF2 was observed. The tornado caused damage along a 14,8 km (9.1 mi) stretch and a width of up to 800 meters ( > 874 yd).
- September 22, 2025 – On this day, at least 21 tornadoes occurred between the states of Paraná and São Paulo. On the 20th, in Santa Catarina, the municipality of Barra Bonita was hit by a strong downburst, but Civil Defense classified it as a tornado. However, Prevots said it was indeed a downburst. On the 22nd, a F1 tornado hit Santa Maria do Oeste, in the state of Paraná, causing moderate to significant damage. Trees were uprooted or snapped, and houses lost their roofs. Also in Paraná, a suspected tornado hit the municipality of Reserva, causing fallen trees and roofs to be ripped off. Later, twenty tornadoes were confirmed in the state of São Paulo. The strongest of these hit the municipality of Porto Feliz, causing extensive damage. The Toyota Engine Factory suffered significant damage, including the loss of its roof, and part of the structure collapsed. In the factory parking lot, a car was thrown 20 meters (22 yd), causing significant damage to the body. Another car was thrown 60 meters away (65 yd), resulting in severe damage and a total loss, as the car was rendered almost unrecognizable. Thirty people were injured. According to PREVOTS, the tornado was classified as E/F2+ and defined as intense. The cause of this outbreak was a large QLCS system.
- November 3, 2025 – A tornado struck the municipality of Itaiópolis, in Santa Catarina. Eucalyptus plantations were damaged, and rural residences suffered moderate to significant damage. No deaths or injuries were reported.

Tornadoes confirmed in southern Brazil on November 7, 2025
Date	F/EF#	Deaths	Injuries	Location
November 7, 2025	F1+	0	4	Dionísio Cerqueira (SC)
60 houses were damaged, trees were uprooted, a school had its roof torn off and its gymnasium partially destroyed. Prevots classified the tornado as a high-end F1. Four people were injured.
November 7, 2025	F1	0	some	Xanxerê and Faxinal dos Guedes (SC)
Trees were uprooted, a truck was overturned, and houses had their roofs blown off.
November 7, 2025	F1	0	?	Xaxim (SC)
Listed and classified, but information about damage is still scarce.
November 7, 2025	F1	0	?	Quedas do Iguaçu (PR)
Listed and classified, but information about damage is still scarce.
November 7, 2025	F1	0	?	Campina do Simão (PR)
Listed and classified, but information about damage is still scarce.
November 7, 2025	F1	0	0	Mauá da Serra and Faxinal (PR)
Several trees and utility poles were knocked down, but some damage was caused by strong downbursts.
November 7, 2025	FU	0	0	Maurilândia do Sul (PR)
In the urban area, more than five trees fell and several houses had their roofs blown off. In a part of the rural area, greenhouses, walls, and utility poles were knocked down or damaged, in addition to sheds and residences having their roofs torn off.
November 7, 2025	F4	5 (+1 indirect)	835	Rio Bonito do Iguaçu (PR)
Main article: 2025 Rio Bonito do Iguaçu tornado A violent tornado struck the municipality of Rio Bonito do Iguaçu, in Paraná, Brazil. Wooden houses were devastated and destroyed, and some brick houses suffered the same fate, but most brick houses lost their roofs or had walls collapse. Several vehicles of different types were overturned, some thrown considerable distances. It is possible to observe that the tornado left deep marks in the ground. In addition, the tornado violently ripped the bark off trees. In total, 5 people died directly as a result of injuries sustained due to the tornado, and one died the next day due to acute heart failure brought on by post-traumatic stress due to the tornado. 835 also received medical attention in the aftermath of the tornado. An experienced engineer was impressed and said: "We were impressed because even the foundations were ripped away." According to Prevots, after further analysis, the partial or complete destruction of several reinforced masonry structures was verified, such as houses, a school, a church and two shops. Classified as F4 (preliminary) by Prevots and also as F4 by a meteorologist from the National Institute for Space Research (INPE).
November 7, 2025	F4	1	some	Guarapuava and Candói (PR)
2025 Southern Brazil tornado outbreak #Candói–Guarapuava, Paraná A violent tornado struck the municipalities of Guarapuava and Candói, in Paraná, Brazil. According to Prevots, two points of extreme devastation (>80%) of the dense native vegetation, composed of hardwood trees, were found. Furthermore, the removal of vegetation cover and soil fragments near these points was also observed. Additionally, a large commercial container was thrown 165 meters away. All these factors led to the classification being updated to F4 (preliminary). In total, there was one death, 22 houses destroyed, and 120 people left homeless. The Rio Bonito tornado occluded over western Candoi, and a new circulation formed shortly afterward, resulting in this tornado.
November 7, 2025	F2	0	0	Turvo (PR)
A significant tornado struck the municipality of Turvo, Paraná, at approximately 7:30 pm. Extensive damage was reported in the municipality. Two wooden houses were destroyed and a restaurant had its more fragile masonry walls collapse. Prevots classified the tornado as F2.

- December 7, 2025 – A nighttime F1 tornado was filmed in Rio das Pedras, in São Paulo state, and was recorded by PREVOTS.
- December 7, 2025 – A nighttime tornado struck Mombuca, in São Paulo state, and was recorded by PREVOTS. Significant damage to the root system of a young sugarcane field suggests an F1.
- December 8, 2025 – A significant tornado struck the municipality of Flores da Cunha, in Rio Grande do Sul. Houses had their roofs torn off, trees were uprooted, more than 20 vineyards were destroyed, and the city's cafeteria and hospital were damaged. No one was injured. Classified as low-end F2.
- December 12, 2025 – A tornado struck the municipality of Teodoro Sampaio, in São Paulo. It lasted a short time and only caused damage to the city's cemetery, breaking or uprooting trees. Damage suggests an F0 and F1 tornado.
- December 23, 2025 – A short-lived tornado with heavy rainfall formed in Farroupilha, in Rio Grande do Sul, causing damage to roofs, fragile structures, and homes. Metsul estimated it as an F1 tornado.
- January 1, 2026 – A brief multi vortex tornado was recorded in rural areas near Mercedes, in Paraná. It was rated an F1. There is some damage in the municipality, but it went further than recorded, and the funnel cloud resembled a scud cloud.
- January 10, 2026 – A strong, narrow, and fast-moving tornado struck the municipality of São José dos Pinhais, in Paraná. Moderate damage was reported, including fallen trees, collapsed walls, and houses with roofs blown off. The tornado was rated F2 by Simepar.
- January 12, 2026 – A tornado was recorded in Felipe Schmidt district of Canoinhas, in Santa Catarina. No damages or injuries were reported.
- January 29, 2026 – A waterspout was recorded in Lagoa dos Patos in the city of Palmares do Sul, Rio Grande do Sul. There was no damage. The tornado likely had an intensity of F0.
- February 7, 2026 – a short-lived F0 tornado struck rural areas of the city of Foz do Iguaçu in Paraná.
- February 8, 2026 – tornado landspout cataloged by Conexão Geoclima was recorded In Ourinhos, São paulo. There was minor damage to tree branches, likely indicating an F0 or low-end F1 tornado.
- February 12, 2026 – tornado cataloged by Conexão Geoclima and Metsul was recorded in Pelotas, Rio grande do sul. The tornado caused significant damage in some areas of the city, probably an F1.
- February 15, 2026 – An unclassified tornado struck the city of Encruzilhada do Sul, in Rio Grande do Sul; reports indicate damage only to vegetation, trees, and soybean crops in the tornado's path. A meteorologist from Prevots confirmed the tornado.
- June 28, 2026 – Around 23:00, a tornado damaged at least 11 homes in a rural area in Reserva municipality, in central Paraná. It uprooted trees and threw a signpost 150 metres (490 ft) away. SIMEPAR assigned this tornado an F2 rating.
- July 28, 2026 – A destructive tornado hit the Brazilian municipalities of Giruá, Sete de Setembro and Senador Salgado Filho in Rio Grande do Sul. Several houses were damaged or destroyed and seven people were hospitalized due to the tornado. In addition to the tornado, hailstorms also impacted the region. The tornado was preliminarily rated high-end F3+ by MetSul Meteorologia and PREVOTS, before PREVOTS subsequently upgraded it to F4 based on an analysis of treefall patterns at three forested sites, referred to as regions. The first region indicated EF4/F4 intensity, while the remaining two regions indicated EF3/F3 intensity.
- August 06, 2026 – That afternoon, following an intense severe weather episode that prompted Prevots to issue a Level 3 severe weather alert, indicating a risk of tornadoes and strong wind gusts, a tornado struck Pedro Osório, in southeastern Rio Grande do Sul, causing serious damage to homes. The tornado formed in the municipality of Herval, traveled at least 34 kilometres (21 mi), and was preliminarily rated F3 by Prevots due to the damage it caused to masonry homes and the lofting of two grain bins approximately 175 metres (191 yd).
- August 08, 2026 – A small tornado outbreak occurred in Paraná. In total, four tornadoes were recorded, the strongest tornado from the outbreak was a violent F4 tornado, with windspeeds estimated at 380 km/h (236 mph), that mainly struck rural areas near Piraí do Sul. The tornado inflicted extreme tree damage and removed large areas of topsoil, with depths measuring 10–30 cm (0.33–0.98 ft). Alongside that, multiple homes and structures were damaged or destroyed, and an electric transmission tower was torn down. The tornado traveled for 26.1 kilometres (16.2 mi) and reached a maximum width of 750 metres (820 yd). Another strong tornado struck areas near Candói.

== Tornadoes by state ==
More information will be added soon, in addition to the inclusion of all states.

Tornadoes in Brazil, by State
State	Number of tornadoes	Area (km^{2})	Strongest rating	times
Paraná	≥ 106	199,324	F4	1959, 1997, 2015, 2025 (twice) and 2026
Santa Catarina	≥ 100	95,731	F4	1948, 1991 and 2009
Rio Grande do Sul	≥100	281,730	F4	2005, 2018 and 2026
São Paulo	≥32	248, 209	F4	1991
Mato Grosso do Sul	≥20	357,145	F3	1989
Minas Gerais	≥10	586,528	F2	1974
Goiás	≥5	340,086	F2	2010
Distrito Federal	~1	5,760	F2	2010
Rio de Janeiro	~7	43,696	F2	2004 and 1864
Alagoas	~1	27,768	F1	2024
Pará	~1	1.247.955	F1	2017
Rondônia	~1	237,590	F2	2007
Bahia	>4	567,295	F0	2008, 2020, 2024 and 2025
Pernambuco	~1	98,312	F0	2022
Amazonas	2	1.559.255	F0	2005 and 2020
Ceará	~1	148.886	F0	2006
Sergipe	1	21.938	FU	1977
Mato Grosso	16	???	F1	2010
Maranhão	5	???	F1	2020
Amapá	6	???	FU	2006
Roraima	~1	???	FU	2021

== Tornadoes by month ==
Tornadoes in Brazil, by month (1920–present) (Note: Only tornadoes (or waterspouts that caused deaths or damage) are being counted. Furthermore, only data from the list itself, obtained through news reports, websites, and dissertations, is being considered.)
	January	February	March	April	May	June	July	August	September	October	November	December
No. of tornadoes	37	22	21	22	51	47	19	17	40	31	50	29
Max F/EF#	F2	F2	F2	F3	F4 (Note: The tornado that occurred in Valinhos, in the interior of the municipality of Canoinhas, Santa Catarina, in May 1948, is considered F4 on this list.)	F4 (Note: A violent F4 tornado struck Nova Laranjeiras, in Paraná, in 1997.)	F4 (Note: A strong tornado struck Francisco Beltrão in 2015, it was rated between F2-F3 by Simepar, however official wind speed estimates from a PREVOTS meteorologist confirmed winds up to 370 km/h (229 mph) from a 5-ton truck thrown 50 metres away.)	F4	F4	F3	F4	F3
