= Macieira =

Macieira may refer to:

- Macieira de Rates, village in Portugal
- Macieira, Santa Catarina, municipality in Brazil
- Macieira Brandy, Portuguese spirit
