= Nova Santa Rosa =

Coordinates: 24.4658°S 53.9528°W

- Municipality
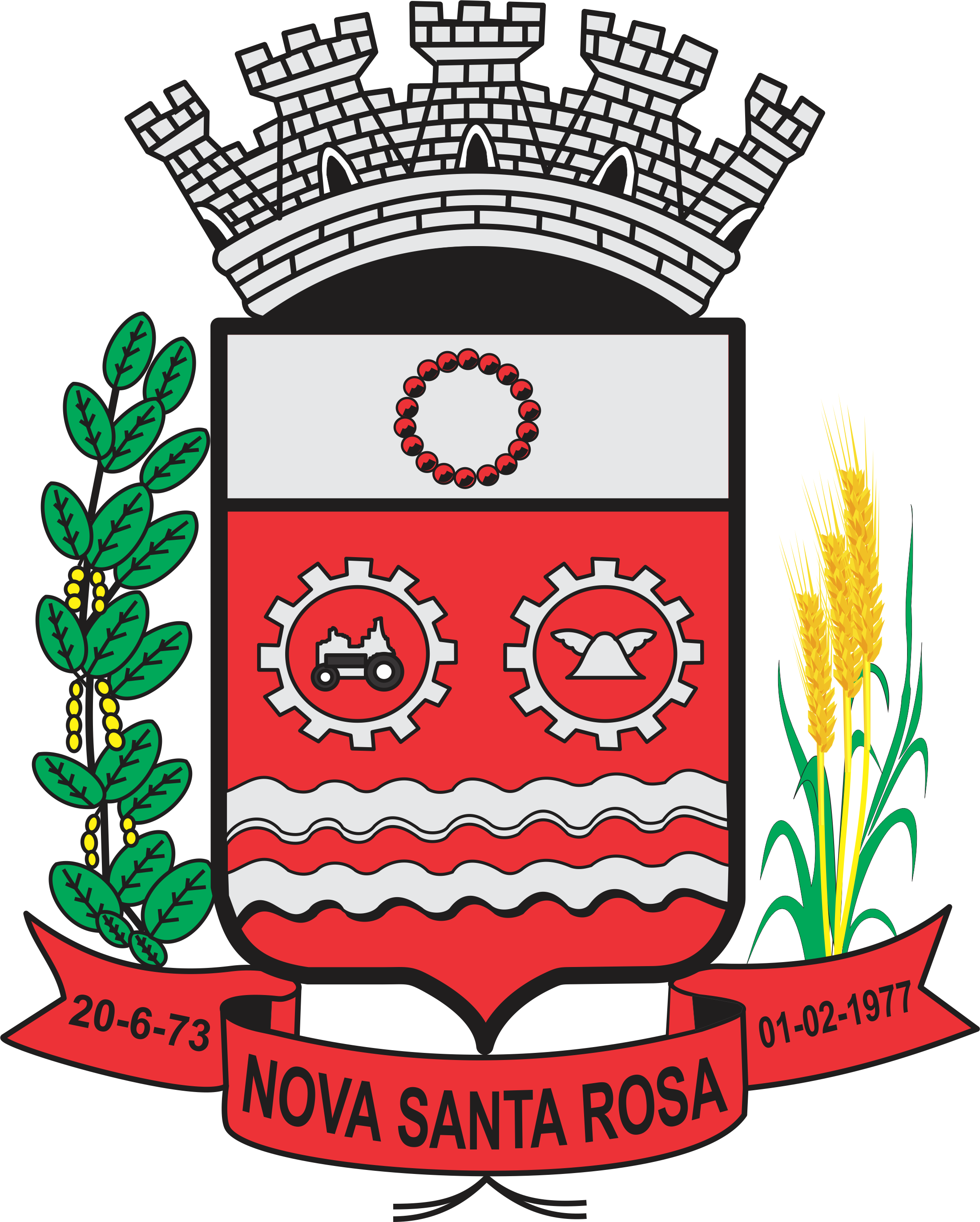
- Flag Coat of arms
- Interactive map of Nova Santa Rosa
- Country: Brazil
- Region: Southern
- State: Paraná
- Mesoregion: Oeste Paranaense

Population (2020)
  - Total: 8,266
- Time zone: UTC−3 (BRT)

Nova Santa Rosa is a municipality in the state of Paraná in the Southern Region of Brazil.

== See also ==
- List of municipalities in Paraná
