= Serranópolis do Iguaçu =

Coordinates: 25.38°S 54.0519°W

- Municipality
- Flag
- Interactive map of Serranópolis do Iguaçu
- Country: Brazil
- Region: Southern
- State: Paraná
- Mesoregion: Oeste Paranaense

Population (2020)
  - Total: 4,477
- Time zone: UTC−3 (BRT)

Serranópolis do Iguaçu is a municipality in the state of Paraná in the Southern Region of Brazil.

== See also ==
- List of municipalities in Paraná
