= Santa Lúcia, Paraná =

Coordinates: 25°24′25″S 53°33′57″W

- Municipality
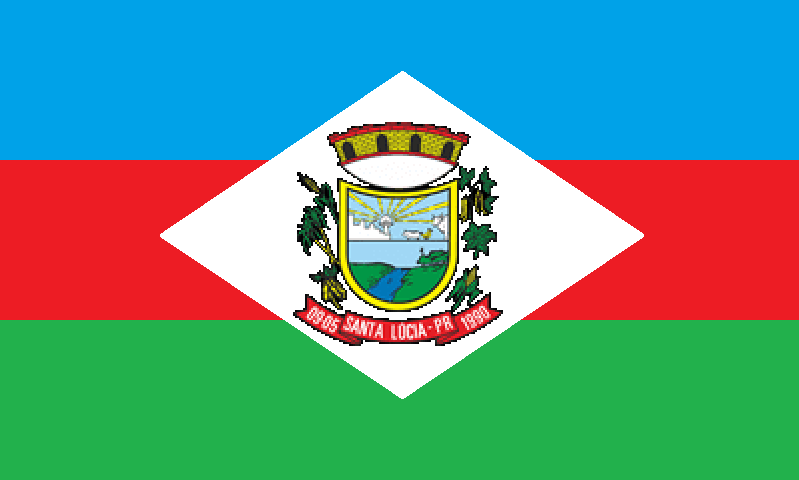
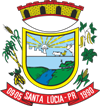
- Flag Coat of arms
- Interactive map of Santa Lúcia, Paraná
- Country: Brazil
- Region: Southern
- State: Paraná
- Mesoregion: Oeste Paranaense

Population (2010)
  - Total: 3,925
- Time zone: UTC−3 (BRT)

Santa Lúcia, Paraná is a municipality in the state of Paraná in the Southern Region of Brazil.

== See also ==
- List of municipalities in Paraná
