= Santo Antônio do Planalto =

Municipality in Rio Grande do Sul, Brazil

Coordinates: 28°23′45″S 52°41′27″W

- Municipality
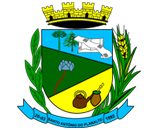
- Flag Coat of arms
- Interactive map of Santo Antônio do Planalto
- Country: Brazil
- Time zone: UTC−3 (BRT)

Santo Antônio do Planalto is a municipality in the state of Rio Grande do Sul, Brazil. As of 2020, the estimated population was 2,019.

== See also ==
- List of municipalities in Rio Grande do Sul
