= Sangão =

Coordinates: 28.6378°S 49.1292°W

- Municipality
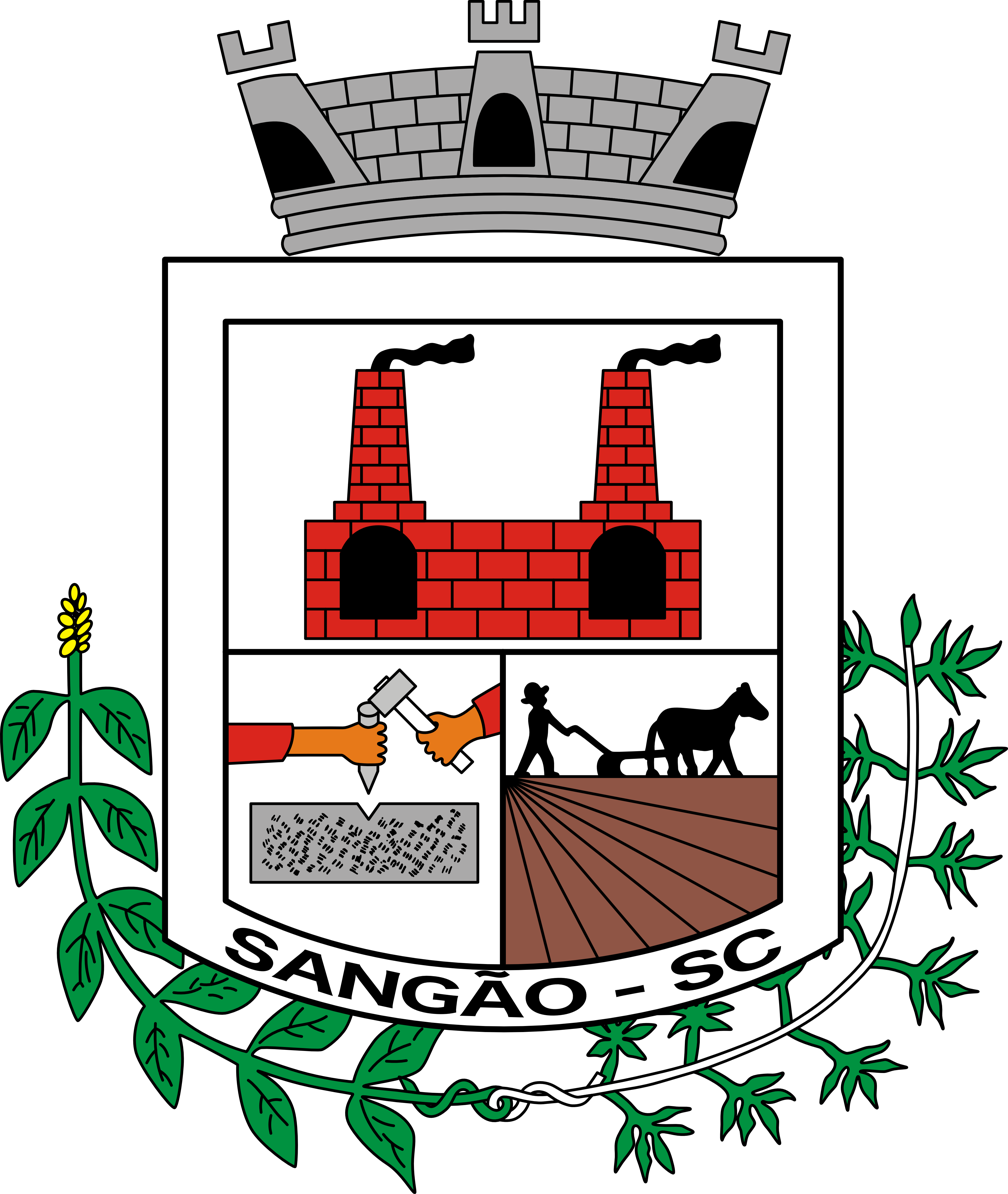
- Flag Coat of arms
- Interactive map of Sangão
- Country: Brazil
- Region: South
- State: Santa Catarina
- Mesoregion: Sul Catarinense

Population (2020)
  - Total: 12,905
- Time zone: UTC -3

Sangão is a municipality in the state of Santa Catarina in the South region of Brazil. In January 2023, the municipality was struck by an F0/1 tornado.

== See also ==
- List of municipalities in Santa Catarina
