= Primeiro de Maio, Paraná =

Coordinates: 22°48′S 51°01′W

- Municipality
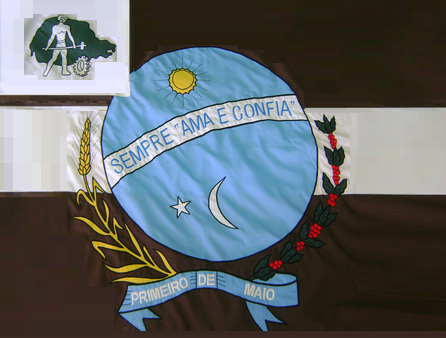
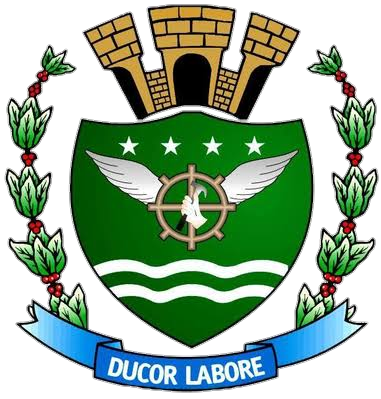
- Flag Coat of arms
- Interactive map of Primeiro de Maio, Paraná
- Country: Brazil
- Region: Southern
- State: Paraná
- Mesoregion: Norte Central Paranaense

Population (2020)
  - Total: 11,130
- Time zone: UTC−3 (BRT)

Primeiro de Maio, Paraná is a municipality in the state of Paraná in the Southern Region of Brazil.

== See also ==
- List of municipalities in Paraná
