= Pareci Novo =

Municipality of Rio Grande do Sul, Brazil

- Municipality
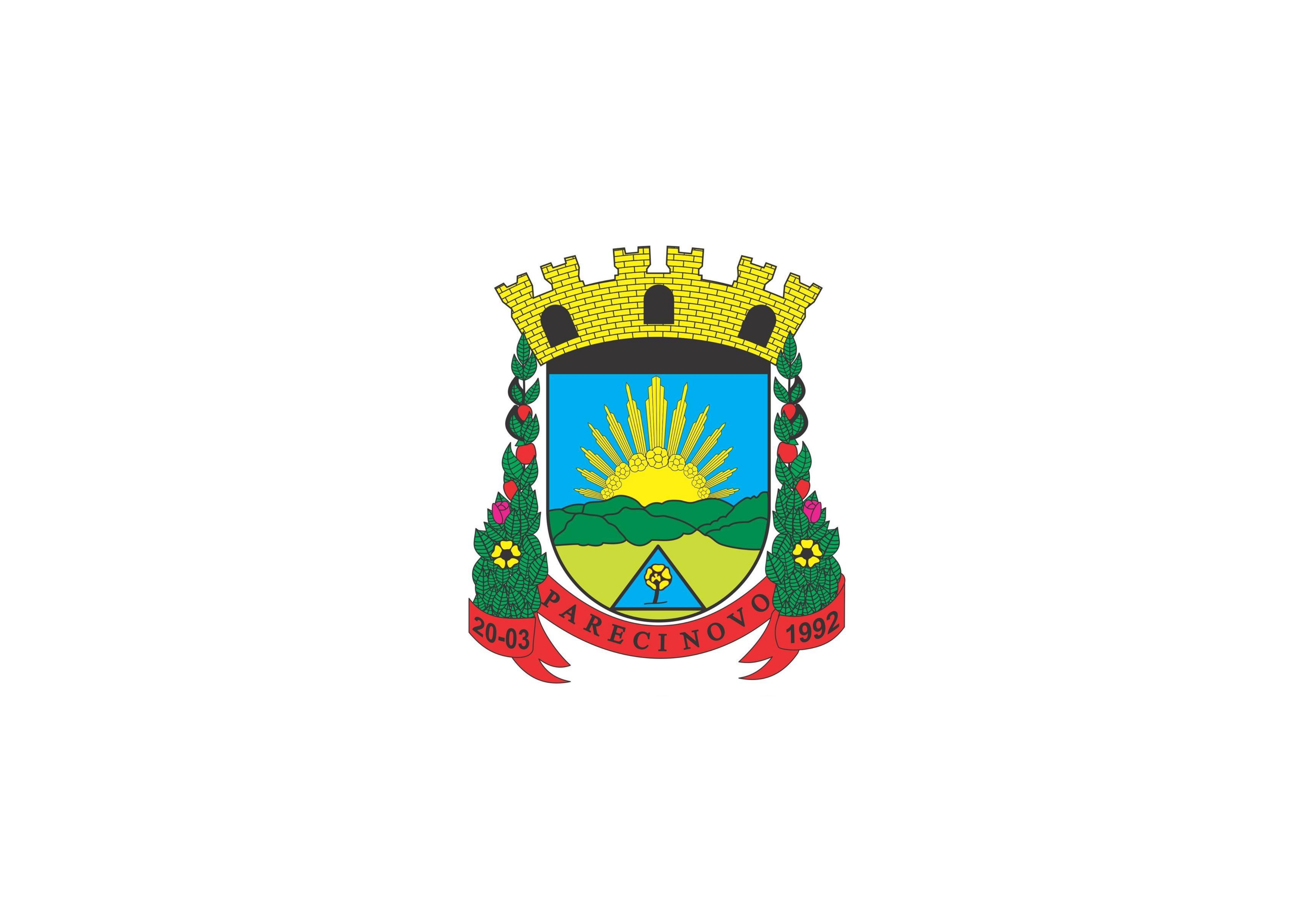
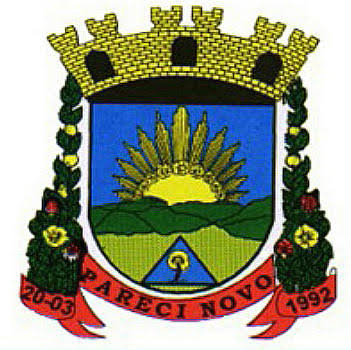
- Flag Coat of arms

- Location within Rio Grande do Sul

- Location in Brazil
- Coordinates: 29°39′S 51°24′W
- Country: Brazil
- State: Rio Grande do Sul

Population (2022)
  - Total: 4,319
- Time zone: UTC−3 (BRT)

Pareci Novo is a municipality in the state of Rio Grande do Sul, Brazil. It was raised to municipality status in 1992, the area being taken out of the municipality of Montenegro. As of 2022, it has 4,319 inhabitants.

== See also ==
- List of municipalities in Rio Grande do Sul
