= Matões =

Coordinates: 5.51889°S 43.1989°W

- Municipality
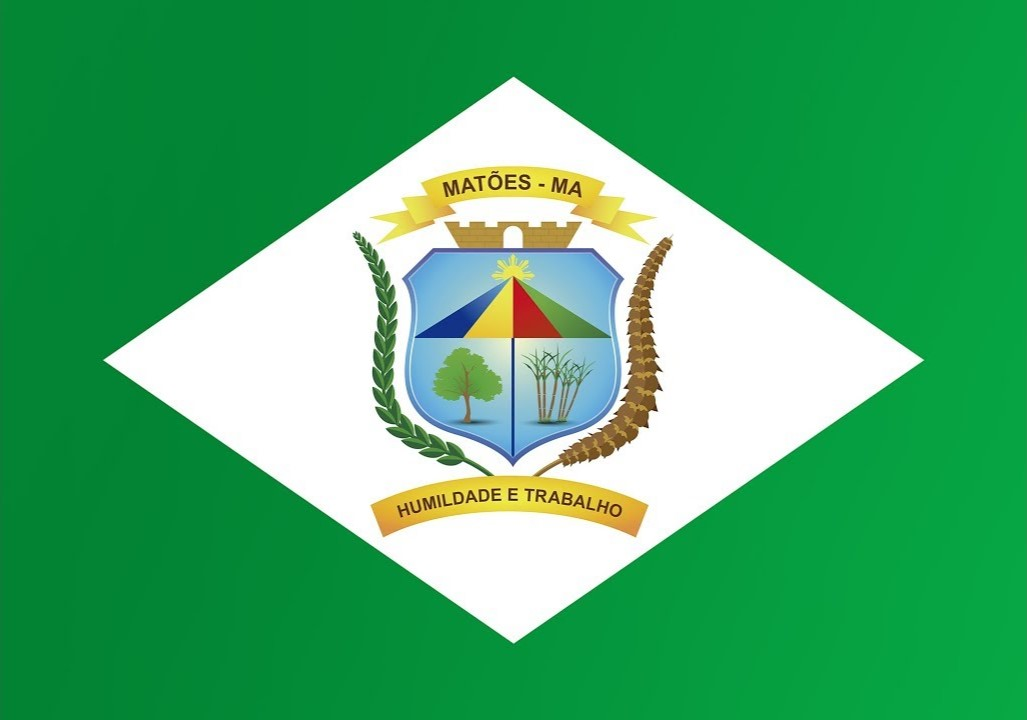
- Flag
- Interactive map of Matões
- Country: Brazil
- Region: Nordeste
- State: Maranhão
- Mesoregion: Leste Maranhense

Population (2020)
  - Total: 33,943
- Time zone: UTC−3 (BRT)

Matões is a municipality in the state of Maranhão in the Northeast region of Brazil.

== See also ==
- List of municipalities in Maranhão
