= Ponte Alta do Norte =

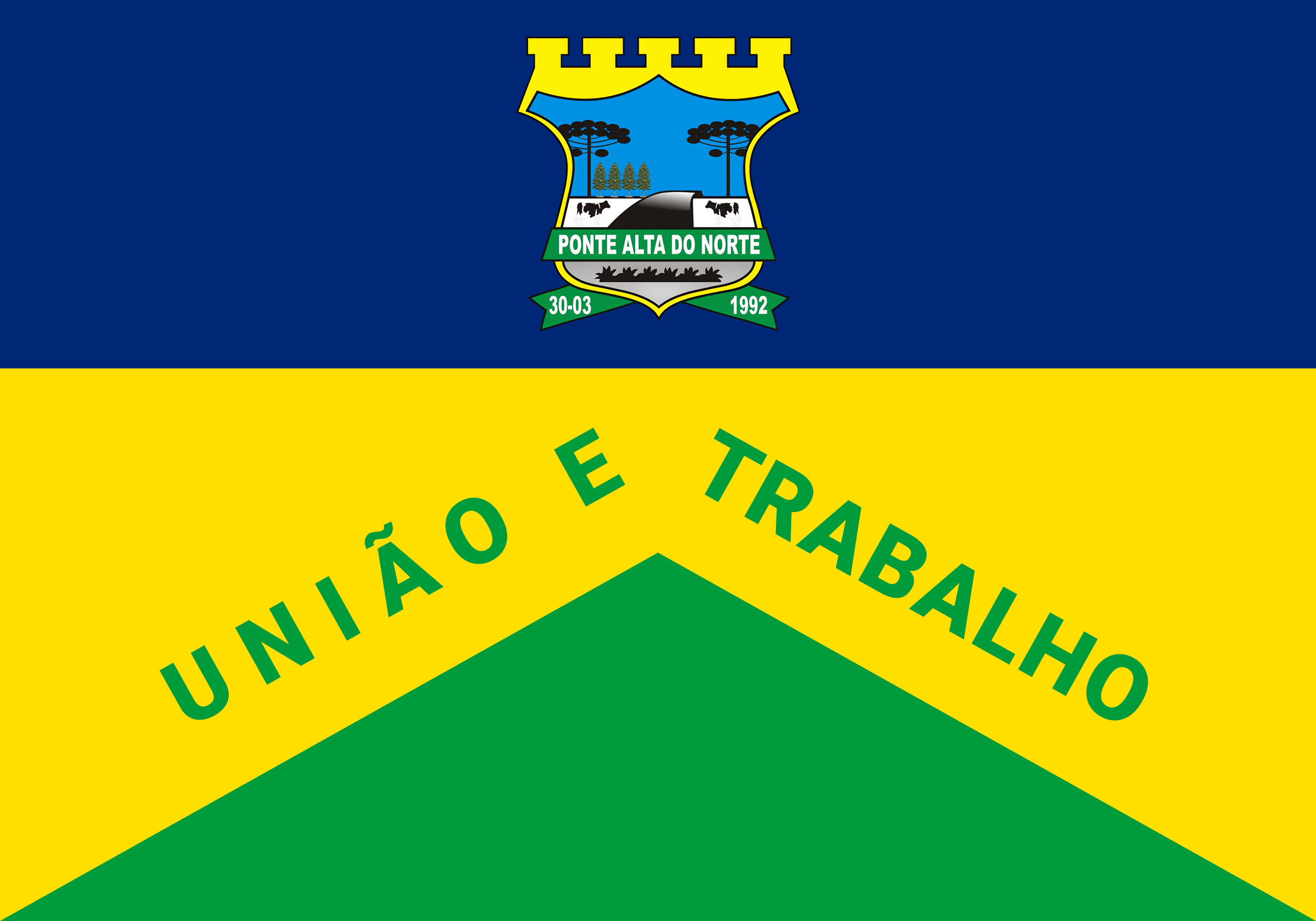
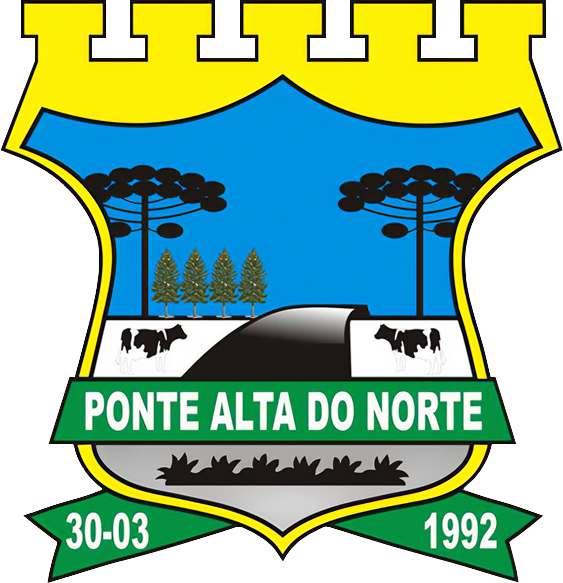
- Flag Coat of arms

- Ponte Alta do Norte

- Location within Brazil
- Coordinates: 27°09′30″S 50°27′52″W
- Country: Brazil
- Region: South
- State: (Santa Catarina (state)) Santa Catarina
- Founded: March 30, 1992

Government
  - Mayor: Laertes Antônio Borella

Area
  - Total: 400.972 km^{2} (154.816 sq mi)
- Elevation: 962 m (3,156 ft)

Population (2020)
  - Total: 3,420
  - Density: 9.1/km^{2} (24/sq mi)
- Time zone: UTC-3 (UTC-3)
  - Summer (DST): UTC-2 (UTC-2)
- HDI (2000): 0.752
- Website: www.pmpan.sc.gov.br

Ponte Alta do Norte is a city in Santa Catarina, in the Southern Region of Brazil.

On 16 May 2016, a rare tornado hit the city, killing three people and injuring 21 others, while over 100 homes were destroyed or damaged. 95% of Ponte Alta do Norte was left without power.
