= Ponte Alta =

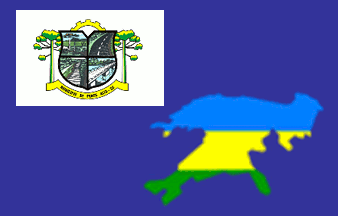
- Flag Coat of arms

- Ponte Alta

- Location within Brazil
- Coordinates: 27°29′02″S 50°22′48″W
- Country: Brazil
- Region: South
- State: (Santa Catarina (state)) Santa Catarina
- Founded: September 20, 1964

Government
  - Mayor: Luiz Paulo Farias

Area
  - Total: 566.754 km^{2} (218.825 sq mi)
- Elevation: 856 m (2,808 ft)

Population (2020)
  - Total: 4,650
  - Density: 9.7/km^{2} (25/sq mi)
- Time zone: UTC-3 (UTC-3)
  - Summer (DST): UTC-2 (UTC-2)
- HDI (2000): 0.727
- Website: www.pontealta.sc.gov.br

Ponte Alta is a city in Santa Catarina, in the Southern Region of Brazil.
