= Luiziana =

Coordinates: 24.2858°S 52.2758°W

- Municipality
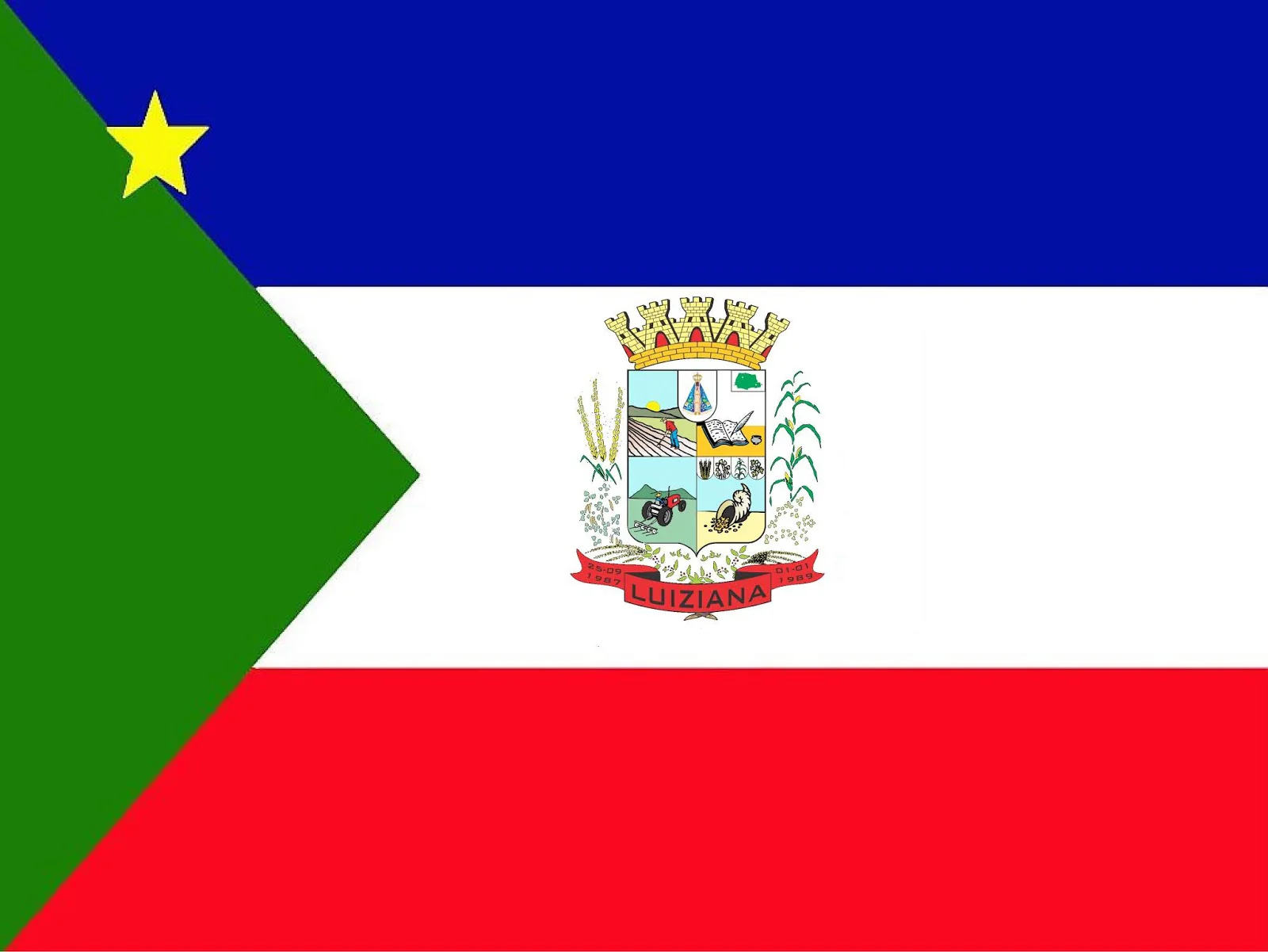
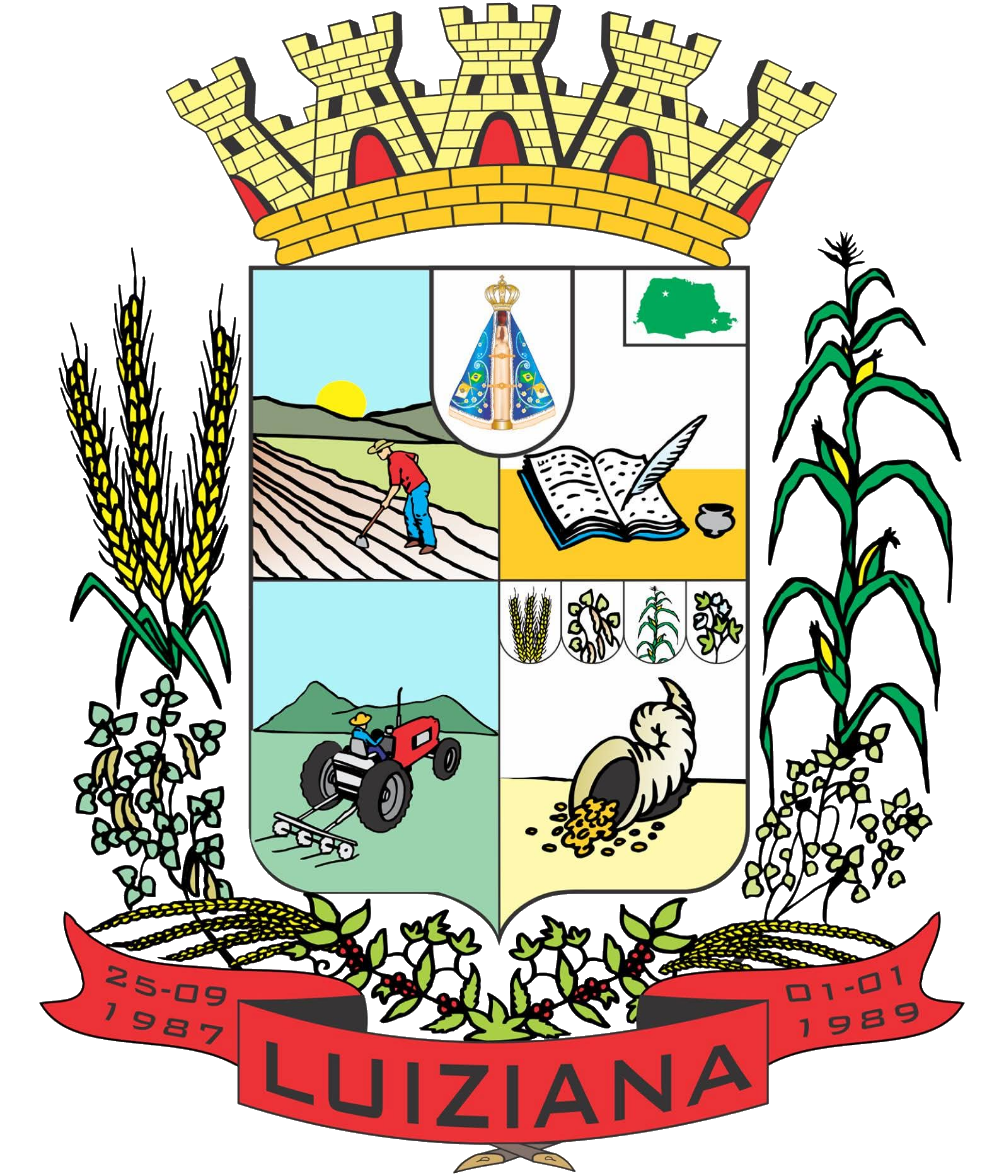
- Flag Coat of arms
- Interactive map of Luiziana
- Country: Brazil
- Region: Southern
- State: Paraná
- Mesoregion: Centro Ocidental Paranaense

Population (2020)
  - Total: 7,240
- Time zone: UTC−3 (BRT)

Luiziana is a municipality in the state of Paraná in the Southern Region of Brazil.

== See also ==
- List of municipalities in Paraná
