= Rio Branco do Ivaí =

Coordinates: 24.3239°S 51.3128°W

- Municipality
- Interactive map of Rio Branco do Ivaí
- Country: Brazil
- Region: Southern
- State: Paraná
- Mesoregion: Norte Central Paranaense

Population (2020)
  - Total: 4,109
- Time zone: UTC−3 (BRT)

Rio Branco do Ivaí is a municipality in the state of Paraná in the Southern Region of Brazil.

== See also ==
- List of municipalities in Paraná
