= Barros Cassal =

Municipality in Rio Grande do Sul, Brazil

Coordinates: 29°06′S 52°35′W

- Municipality
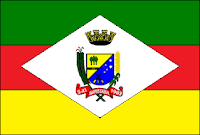
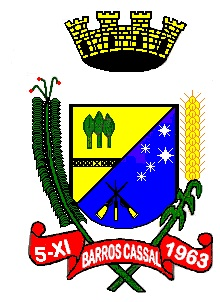
- Flag Coat of arms

- Location of Barros Cassal in Rio Grande do Sul
- Country: Brazil
- Region: South
- State: Rio Grande do Sul
- Mesoregion: Noroeste Rio-Grandense
- Microregion: Soledad
- Founded: 5 November 1963

Government
  - Mayor: Adão Reginei dos Santos Camargo (PSB, 2021–2024)

Area
  - Total: 647.994 km^{2} (250.192 sq mi)

Population (2021)
  - Total: 11,167
  - Density: 17.233/km^{2} (44.634/sq mi)
- Demonym: Barroscassalense
- Time zone: UTC−3 (BRT)
- Website: Official website

Barros Cassal is a municipality in the state of Rio Grande do Sul, Brazil. As of 2020, the estimated population was 11,182.

== See also ==
- List of municipalities in Rio Grande do Sul
