= Macieira, Santa Catarina =

Macieira
- Municipality
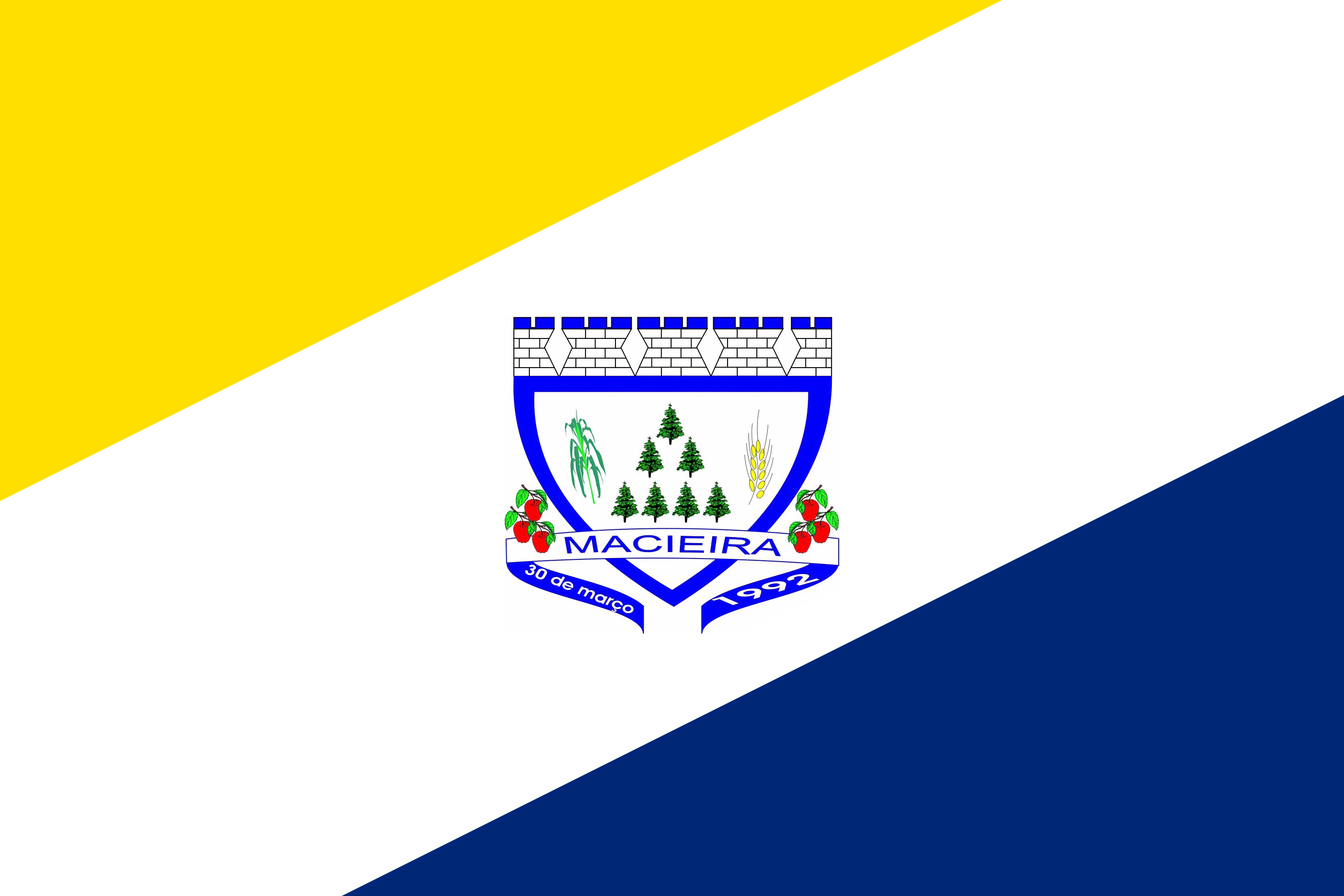
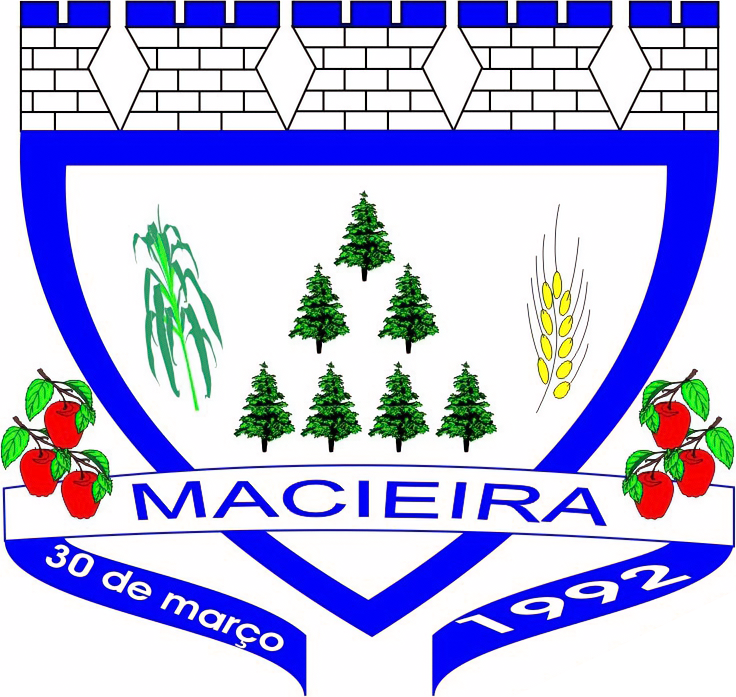
- Flag Coat of arms
- Interactive map of Macieira
- Coordinates: 26°51′S 51°23′W
- Country: Brazil
- Region: South
- State: Santa Catarina
- Mesoregion: Oeste Catarinense

Population (2020)
  - Total: 1,766
- Time zone: UTC -3
- Website: www.macieira.sc.gov.br

Macieira is a municipality in the state of Santa Catarina in the South region of Brazil.

== See also ==
- List of municipalities in Santa Catarina
