= List of South American tornadoes in 2025 =

South American tornadoes of 2025
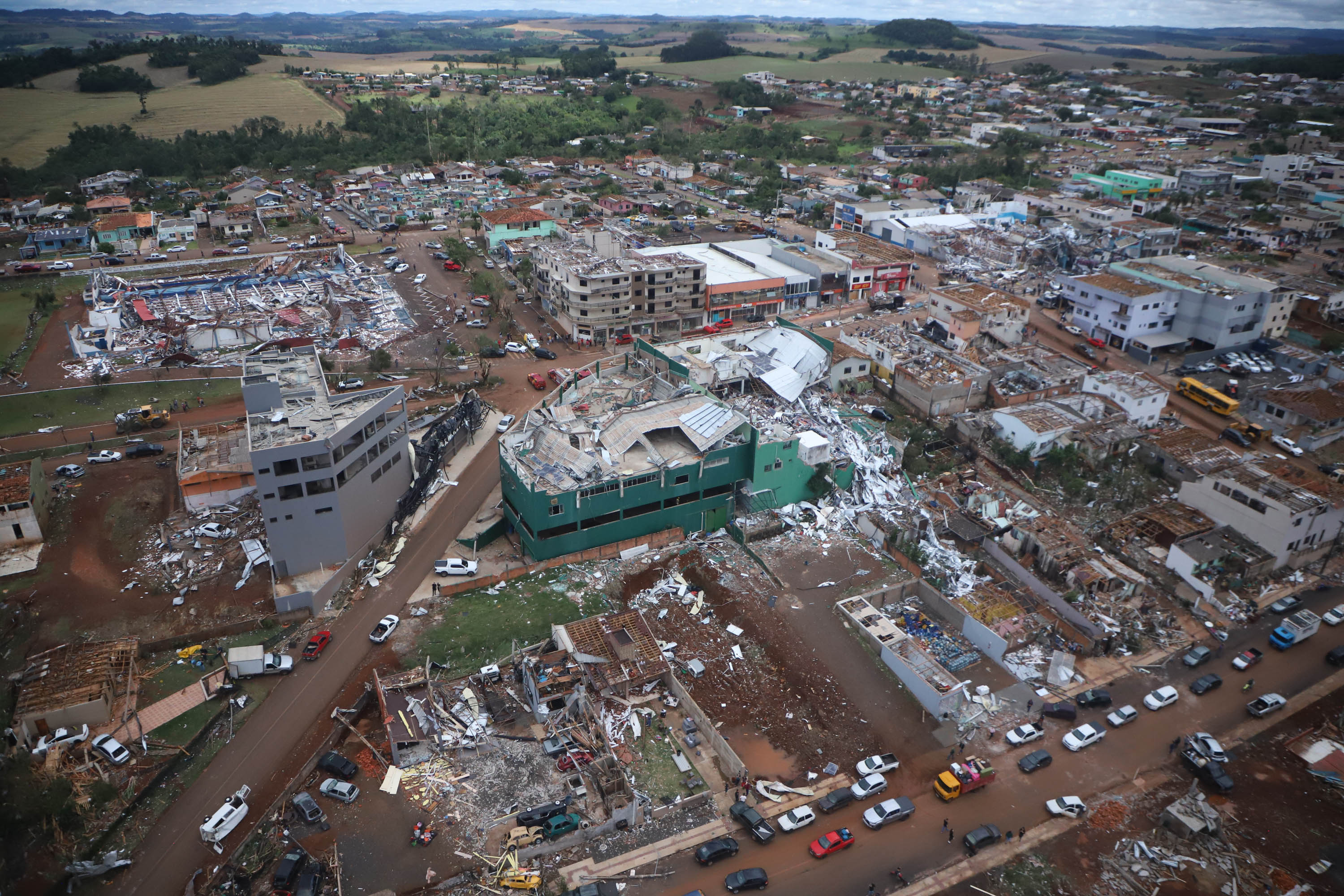
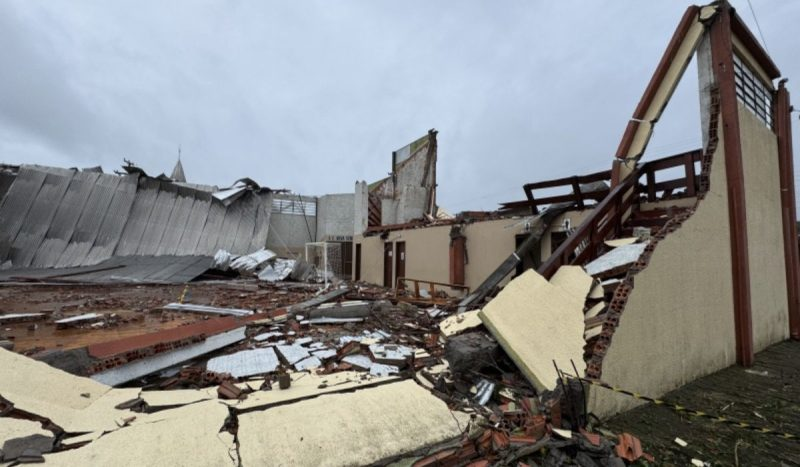
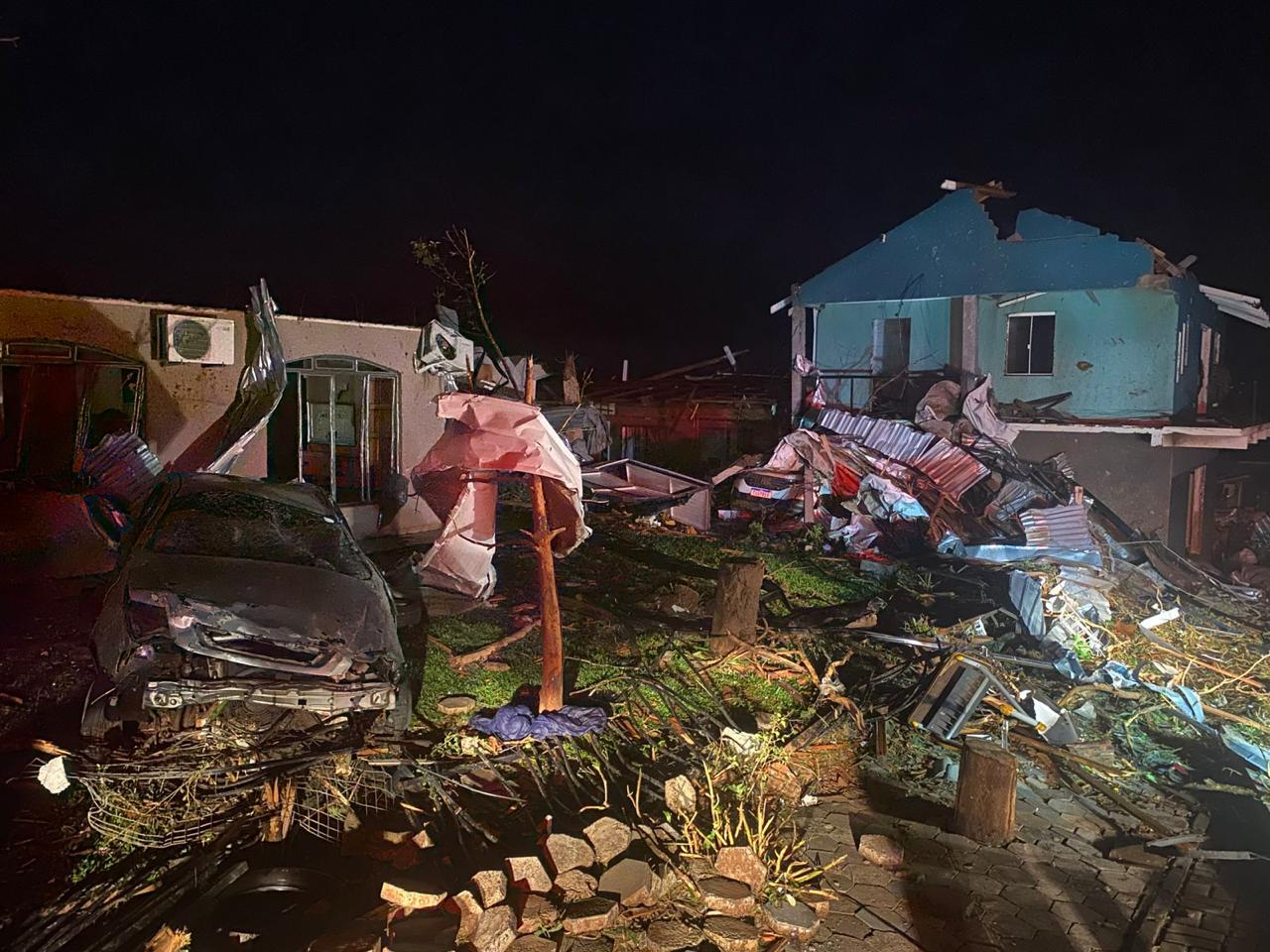
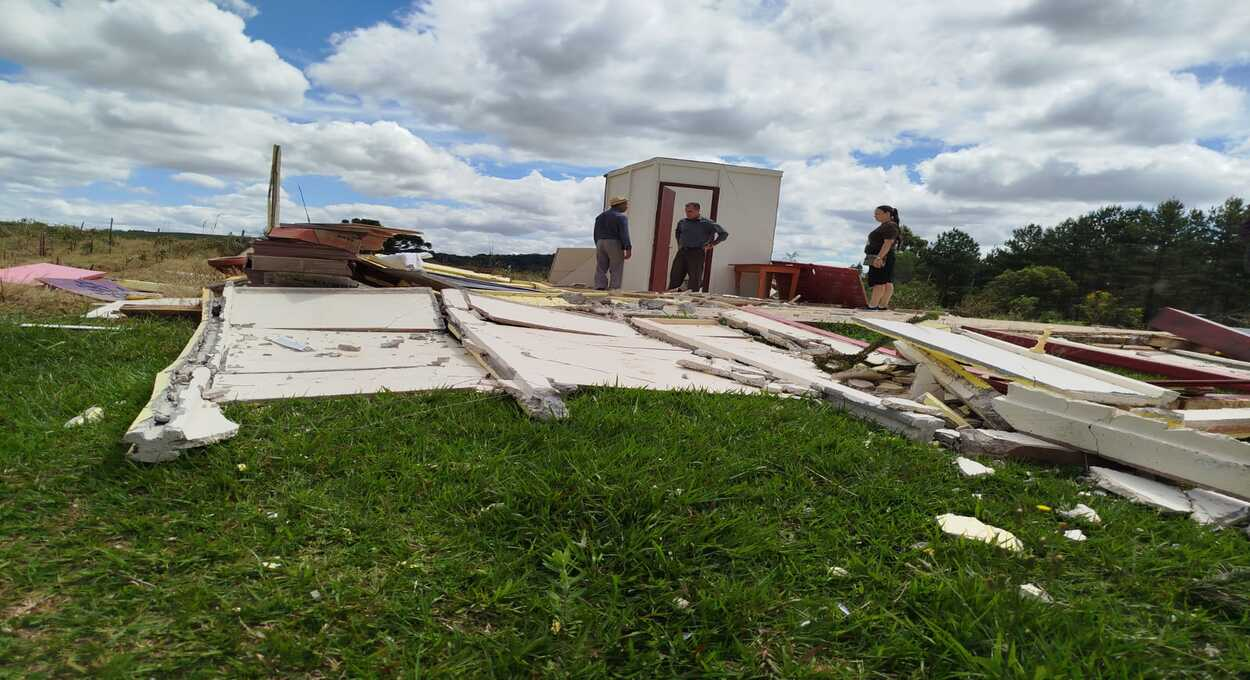
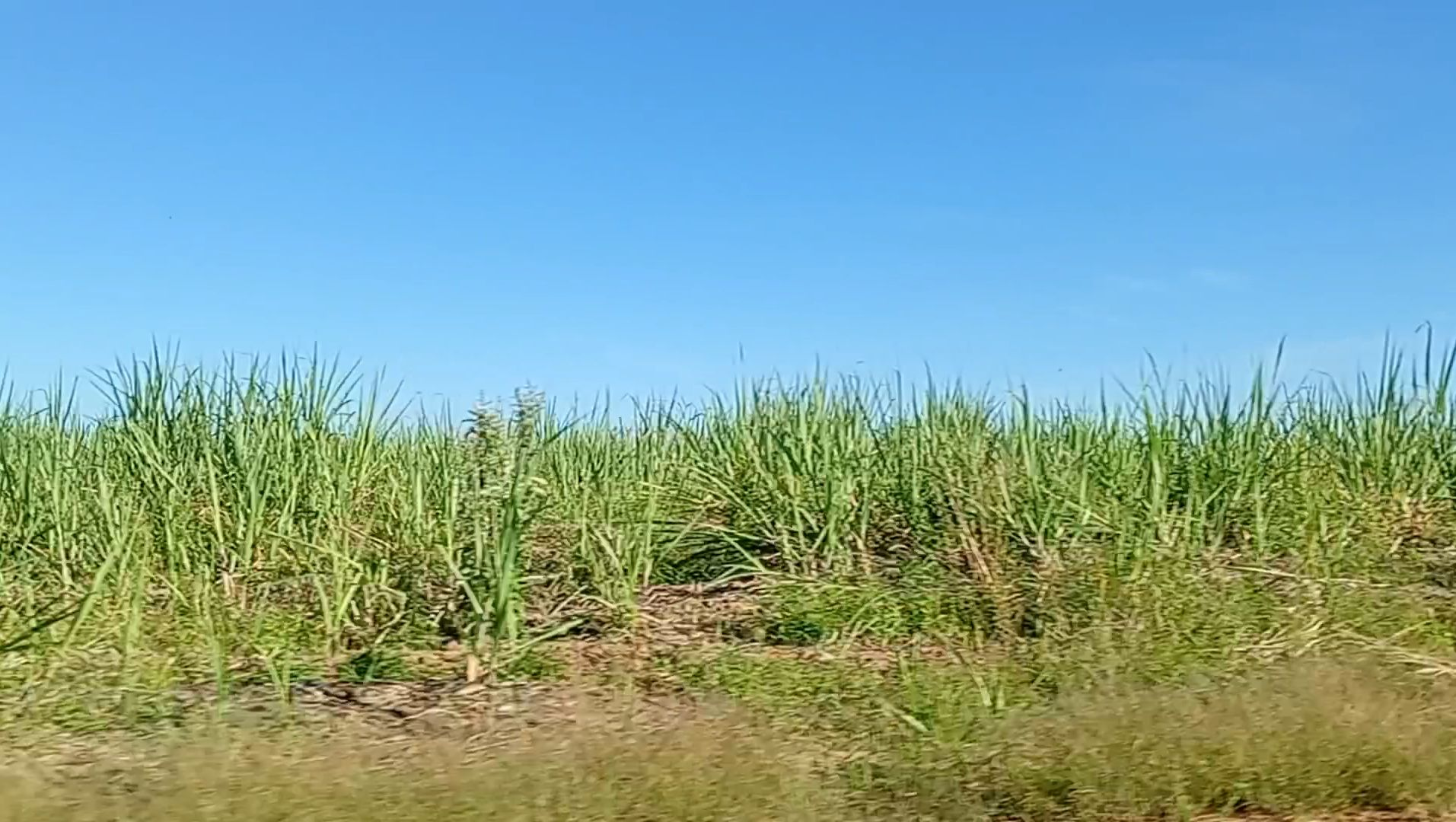
- Clockwise from top: Aerial view of the damage caused by the Rio Bonito do Iguaçu tornado; A masonry stadium partially destroyed; Piles of debris left after an enormous F4 tornado; A church completely destroyed by another F4 tornado in Guarapuava; A sugarcane field partially damaged by a tornado in Mombuca.
- Timespan: January 1st - December 28th
- Maximum rated tornado: F4 tornado: Rio Bonito do Iguaçu, Brazil on November 7; Guarapuava, Candói, Brazil on November 7
- Tornadoes: 92
- Fatalities: 8 (859 injuries)

The 2025 South American season consisted of tornadoes and tornado outbreaks across South America.

Confirmed tornadoes by Fujita rating
FU	F0	F1	F2	F3	F4	F5	Total
6	4	14	6	0	2	0	92

- Note: 16 tornadoes have been confirmed but not yet rated
- Note: Some tornadoes have been rated using different scales. They are counted as their closest F-Scale equivalent on this table.

Some tornadoes may be rated using different scales like the Enhanced Fujita scale, as some countries like Chile, Brazil or Paraguay uses partially or unofficially the Enhanced Fujita scale through independent studies or official estimates. However, because the Fujita scale isn't adapted to a single code build, it is mostly used between these countries due to the simplicity of adaptation and use, however, during damage assessment, Damage Indicators (DIs) from the EF-scale are still used to calculate and attribute a rating.

Note that most tornadoes outside Brazil, Argentina and Chile may lack information or sources due to the rarity of such event or scarce documentation.

== Climatology ==
Similar to North America or Europe, South America also experiences a few tornadoes per year, Brazil being one of the countries with the highest incidence of tornadoes outside the regions traditionally known for such phenomena. According to a survey by the State University of Ponta Grossa (UEPG), between 1975 and 2018, a total of 581 tornadoes were recorded in the country, 411 of which occurred in the Southern Region, accounting for approximately 70% of all cases.

In 2018, the PREVOTS platform was established to document severe weather events across Brazil. Upon completing five years of operation, a report indicated that between June 2018 and June 2023, 321 damage incidents caused by tornadoes were recorded, including waterspouts. Most tornadoes in Brazil are associated with high-precipitation supercells, resulting in rain-wrapped tornadoes that are difficult to see.

The annual average number of tornadoes in Brazil remains uncertain due to the country's less robust meteorological infrastructure compared to nations like the United States or Canada, and because of the low population density in the most tornado-prone areas. These factors contribute to underreporting, with many tornadoes being identified only months or even years after they occur. Recent estimates suggest a plausible average of 50 to 60 tornadoes per year, although this figure lacks official confirmation due to the aforementioned limitations.

== January ==
Confirmed tornadoes by Fujita rating
FU	F0	F1	F2	F3	F4	F5	Total
0	1	1	0	0	0	0	4

- Note: 2 tornadoes have been confirmed but not yet rated

=== January 1 ===
List of confirmed tornadoes - Wednesday, January 1 2025 (Note: All dates are based on the local time zone where the tornado touched down; however, all times are in Coordinated Universal Time for consistency.)
F#	Location	Country	Start coord.	Time (UTC-3)	Path length	Max width
F?	Mar Chiquita	AR	Unknown	~12:00	Unknown	Unknown
A brief multi-vortex tornado touched down on Mar Chiquita, Argentina and caused minor damages before dissipating.

=== January 8 ===
List of confirmed tornadoes - Wednesday, January 8 2025
F#	Location	Country	Start coord.	Time (UTC-3)	Path length	Max width
F?	Formosa do Rio Preto, Bahia	BR	Unknown	Unknown	Unknown	Unknown
A landspout was seen through the rural areas of Formosa do Rio Preto, in Bahia. It was registered by a resident and confirmed by Prevots.

=== January 24 ===
List of confirmed tornadoes - Friday, January 24 2025
F#	Location	Country	Start coord.	Time (UTC-3)	Path length	Max width
F0	Curuçá, Pará	BR	Unknown	Unknown	Unknown	Unknown
A waterspout struck Curuçá, in Pará. It advanced towards the land and caused little damage.

=== January 31 ===
List of confirmed tornadoes - Friday, January 31 2025
F#	Location	Country	Start coord.	Time (UTC-3)	Path length	Max width
EF1	Piracicaba, São Paulo	BR	22.764028°S 47.688667°W	19:04	0.3 km (0.19 mi)	50 m (55 yd)
A brief tornado damaged an Eucalyptus grandis commercial plantation. Some trees were debarked, snapped and twisted.

== March ==
Confirmed tornadoes by Fujita rating
FU	F0	F1	F2	F3	F4	F5	Total
0	0	0	0	0	0	0	2

- Note: 2 tornadoes have been confirmed but not yet rated

=== March 3 ===
List of confirmed tornadoes - Monday, March 3 2025
F#	Location	Country	Start coord.	Time (UTC-3)	Path length	Max width
F?	Tacuarembó, Tacuarembó Department	UR	Unknown	Unknown	Unknown	Unknown
A tornado occurred in an open field; Some trees were snapped. The event caused no human deaths or injuries, but it killed some animals.

=== March 31 ===
List of confirmed tornadoes - Saturday, March 31 2025
F#	Location	Country	Start coord.	Time (UTC-3)	Path length	Max width
F?	Guaíba, Rio Grande do Sul	BR	Unknown	Unknown	Unknown	Unknown
A waterspout struck Guaíba, in Rio Grande do Sul. It occurred during a severe weather event with strong winds; at least two waterspouts were recorded.

== April ==
Confirmed tornadoes by Fujita rating
FU	F0	F1	F2	F3	F4	F5	Total
0	0	0	0	0	0	0	2

- Note: 2 tornadoes (waterspouts) have been confirmed but not yet rated

=== April 5 ===
List of confirmed tornadoes - Saturday, April 05 2025
F#	Location	Country	Start coord.	Time (UTC-3)	Path length	Max width
F?	Aracruz, Espírito Santo	BR	Unknown	17:00	Unknown	Unknown
A waterspout was documented by bathers just a couple of metres away from the sand.

=== April 18 ===
List of confirmed tornadoes - Friday, April 18 2025
F#	Location	Country	Start coord.	Time (UTC-3)	Path length	Max width
F?	Três Marias, Minas Gerais	BR	Unknown	Unknown	Unknown	Unknown
A brief waterspout was recorded by a local fisher in a dam on Rio São Francisco.

== May ==
Confirmed tornadoes by Fujita rating
FU	F0	F1	F2	F3	F4	F5	Total
0	0	1	1	0	0	0	6

- Note: 4 tornadoes have been confirmed but not yet rated

=== May 8 ===
List of confirmed tornadoes - Thursday, May 8 2025
F#	Location	Country	Start coord.	Time (UTC-3)	Path length	Max width
F?	Bossoroca, Rio Grande do Sul	BR	Unknown	Unknown	Unknown	<1 km
On the 8th, two tornadoes were spotted in the rural area of Bossoroca, Rio Grande do Sul, in the early evening. There was no significant damage.
F?	Bossoroca, Rio Grande do Sul	BR	Unknown	Unknown	Unknown	<1 km
On the 8th, two tornadoes were spotted in the rural area of Bossoroca, Rio Grande do Sul, in the early evening. There was no significant damage.

=== May 9 ===
List of confirmed tornadoes - Friday, May 9 2025
F#	Location	Country	Start coord.	Time (UTC-3)	Path length	Max width
F2	Erval Grande, Rio Grande do Sul	BR	Unknown	Unknown	Unknown	Unknown
A tornado classified as F2 by Prevots struck Erval Grande, also in Rio Grande do Sul. Many properties were affected and damaged, with trees and power lines downed.
F?	Palmitos, Santa Catarina	BR	Unknown	14:00	Unknown	Unknown
1 death — A tornado struck Palmitos on Santa Catarina, damaging more than 50 rural properties and downing trees, resulting in the fatality of a man and 65 displaced people. The phenomenon lasted 20 minutes.
F?	Santo Amaro da Imperatriz, Santa Catarina	BR	Unknown	19:00-19:30	Unknown	Unknown
A tornado struck Santo Amaro da Imperatriz, where homes were damaged, including a mixed-wood and masonry residence that suffered serious damage. Trees were downed and one fatality was confirmed.

=== May 25 ===
List of confirmed tornadoes - Sunday, May 25 2025
F#	Location	Country	Start coord.	Time (UTC-3)	Path length	Max width
EF1	Puerto Varas, Los Lagos Region	CL	Unknown	15:30	Unknown	Unknown
Caused minimal damages to the city, no injuries were documented.

== June ==
Confirmed tornadoes by Fujita rating
FU	F0	F1	F2	F3	F4	F5	Total
2	0	0	1	0	0	0	8

- Note: 5 tornadoes have been confirmed but not yet rated

=== June 3 ===
List of confirmed tornadoes - Tuesday, June 3 2025
F#	Location	Country	Start coord.	Time (UTC-3)	Path length	Max width
FU	Kaloré, Paraná	BR	Unknown	Unknown	Unknown	Unknown
A tornado struck Kaloré, in Paraná. Caused light to moderate damage to crops. Confirmed by Prevots.

=== June 4 ===
List of confirmed tornadoes - Tuesday, June 3 2025
F#	Location	Country	Start coord.	Time (UTC-3)	Path length	Max width
FU	Lajeado Grande, Santa Catarina	BR	Unknown	Unknown	Unknown	Unknown
A tornado (FU) struck Lajeado Grande, in Santa Catarina. It was said to be the beginning of a tornado, but confirmed as a tornado by Civil Defense and Prevots.

=== June 22 ===
List of confirmed tornadoes - Sunday, June 22 2025
F#	Location	Country	Start coord.	Time (UTC-3)	Path length	Max width
F?	São José do Cerrito, Santa Catarina	BR	Unknown	Unknown	Unknown	Unknown
A tornado struck São José do Cerrito, in Santa Catarina causing moderate damage to vegetation, with some trees being downed.
F?	Lages, Santa Catarina	BR	Unknown	Unknown	Unknown	Unknown
Another tornado struck Lages, in Santa Catarina causing moderate damage to vegetation, with some trees being downed.
F?	Descanso, Santa Catarina	BR	Unknown	Unknown	Unknown	Unknown
Another tornado struck Descanso also recorded a tornado. In this case, there was severe damage to eucalyptus plantations.
F?	Belmonte, Santa Catarina	BR	Unknown	Unknown	Unknown	Unknown
Another tornado struck Belmonte also recorded a tornado. In this case, there was severe damage to eucalyptus plantations.
F?	Xavantina, Santa Catarina	BR	Unknown	Unknown	Unknown	Unknown
A final tornado occurred in Xavantina, causing damage to forested areas.

=== June 23 ===
List of confirmed tornadoes - Monday, June 23 2025
F#	Location	Country	Start coord.	Time (UTC-3)	Path length	Max width
EF2	Passos Maia, Santa Catarina	BR	Unknown	Unknown	14.8 km (9.1 mi)	>800 m (>874 yd)
In the early morning of the 23rd, a strong tornado struck Passos Maia. Trees were uprooted or cut and thrown several meters. Power poles were snapped and toppled. Warehouses were completely destroyed. According to Prevots, the tornado was classified as EF2/F2. However, in some parts of its path, damage consistent with intensities above EF2 was observed.

== July ==
Confirmed tornadoes by Fujita rating
FU	F0	F1	F2	F3	F4	F5	Total
0	0	0	0	0	0	0	1

- Note: 1 tornado has been confirmed but not yet rated

=== July 13 ===
List of confirmed tornadoes - Sunday, July 13 2025
F#	Location	Country	Start coord.	Time (UTC-3)	Path length	Max width
F?	Aracruz, Espírito Santo	BR	Unknown	Unknown	Unknown	Unknown
Two waterspouts were registered by local residents in Barra do Riacho and caused no damage.

== August ==
Confirmed tornadoes by Fujita rating
FU	F0	F1	F2	F3	F4	F5	Total
0	0	1	0	0	0	0	1

=== August 30 ===
List of confirmed tornadoes - Saturday, August 30 2025
F#	Location	Country	Start coord.	Time (UTC-3)	Path length	Max width
F1	Soledad, Atlántico	CO	Unknown	Unknown	Unknown	Unknown
A tornado struck the town of Soledad, Colombia, damaging over 700 homes across 10 neighborhoods. Eleven people were injured and received medical attention. Mayor Alcira Sandoval declared a state of public calamity to coordinate emergency response and humanitarian aid.

== September ==
Confirmed tornadoes by Fujita rating
FU	F0	F1	F2	F3	F4	F5	Total
3	3	1	1	0	0	0	8

- Note: 3 tornadoes have been confirmed but not yet rated

=== September 20 ===
List of confirmed tornadoes - Saturday, September 20
F#	Location	Country	Start coord.	Time (UTC-3)	Path length	Max width
F0	San Luis	AR	Unknown	Unknown	Unknown	Unknown
Landspout with winds over 70 km/h (43 mph) registered by local residents crossing the rural areas of San Luis, Argentina, beginning the September 2025 tornado outbreak that occurred on Brazil, Uruguay and Argentina.
EF0	Linares	CL	Unknown	12:00	Unknown	Unknown
A tornado destroyed multiple homes causing widespread power outages, ripped roofs off multiple homes, uprooted trees and downed power lines.
F0	San Pedro de La Paz	AR	Unknown	14:00	Unknown	Unknown
Little to no information, rated preliminary as F0.

=== September 22 ===
List of confirmed tornadoes - Monday, September 21
F#	Location	Country	Start coord.	Time (UTC-3)	Path length	Max width
FU	Barra Bonita, Santa Catarina	BR	Unknown	Unknown	Unknown	Unknown
A strong tornado struck Barra Bonita that damaged about 40 houses, including one wooden house that was lifted on top of a car.
F1	Santa Maria do Oeste, Paraná	BR	Unknown	Unknown	Unknown	Unknown
An F1 tornado struck Santa Maria do Oeste, damaging crops and houses, leaving residents in blackout and without water.
FU	Reserva, Paraná	BR	Unknown	Unknown	Unknown	Unknown
Tornado struck Reserva and snapped and uprooted trees and destroyed greenhouses.
FU	Concepción	PY	Unknown	15:00	Unknown	Unknown
Approximately 50 homes were partially or fully destroyed with the passage of the tornado.
EF2+	Porto Feliz, São Paulo	BR	Unknown	Unknown	Unknown	Unknown
Another tornado touched down and struck Porto Feliz where a Toyota plant suffered extensive damages, injuring 30 workers. The tornado was preliminary rated EF2+ by PREVOTS.

== November ==
Confirmed tornadoes by Fujita rating
FU	F0	F1	F2	F3	F4	F5	Total
1	0	5	1	0	2	0	10

- Note: 1 tornado has been confirmed but not yet rated

=== November 3 ===
List of confirmed tornadoes - Monday, November 3 2025
F#	Location	Country	Start coord.	Time (UTC-3)	Path length	Max width
F?	Itaiópolis, Santa Catarina	BR	Unknown	14:55	~7 km (4 mi)	Unknown
A tornado struck the municipality of Itaiópolis, in Santa Catarina. Eucalyptus trees were damaged, and homes in Itápolis suffered moderate to significant damage, with no deaths or injuries were reported.

=== November 7 ===
List of confirmed tornadoes – Friday, November 7, 2025
F#	Location	Country	Start coord.	Time (UTC)	Path length	Max. width
F1	Dionísio Cerqueria, Santa Catarina	BR	Unknown	Unknown	Unknown	Unknown
F1	4 injuries – This tornado caused damage to approximately 60 homes. There were reports of roofs being torn off and trees falling. Damage was reported at a school and a church.					
F1	Xaxim, Santa Catarina	BR	Unknown	~16:00	Unknown	Unknown
F1	Supercellular tornado rated by PREVOTS, but information is scarce.					
F1	Xanxerê, Faxinal dos Guedes, Santa Catarina	BR	Unknown	~17:00	Unknown	Unknown
F1	Partial destruction of structures was reported, along with vehicle damage and a bus being flipped over. 164 houses had received tarpaulins.					
F1	Quedas do Iguaçu, Paraná	BR	Unknown	Unknown	Unknown	Unknown
F1	Another supercellular tornado rated by PREVOTS, but information is scarce.					
F4	Quedas do Iguaçu, Espigão Alto do Iguaçu, Nova Laranjeiras, Rio Bonito do Iguaçu, Porto Barreiro, Laranjeiras do Sul, Virmond, Cantagalo, Paraná	BR	~25.4525149°S 52.9071011°W	17:30	75 km (47 mi)	3,250 m (3,550 yd)
F4	6 deaths, 835 injuries – A destructive tornado devasted the municipality of Rio Bonito do Iguaçu, injuring 835 people and causing devastating widespread damage. The tornado affected 90% of the structures, devasting schools, supermarkets and churches. With a total of 1,000 people displaced and 4,000 affected directly or indirectly by the tornado. Caused by an interaction between a mass of warm, humid air coming from the north of the country and a strong cold front advancing through the south, driven by an extratropical cyclone. The atmospheric conditions favored the formation of a supercell. Rated E/F4 by PREVOTS, MetSul Meteorologia and Simepar. See full article					
F4	Candói, Guarapuava, Paraná	BR	~25.5515547°S 52.0274396°W	~18:00	44 km (27 mi)	1,160 m (1,270 yd)
F4	1 death – See section on this tornado – Extreme sweeping of dense hardwood trees were found at two points along the path of this tornado. Ground scouring was also noted at these points. A large commercial container was hurled 165 m (180 yd).					
F1	Campina do Simão, Paraná	BR	Unknown	Unknown	Unknown	Unknown
F1	Another supercellular tornado rated by PREVOTS, but information is scarce.					
F2	Turvo, Paraná	BR	~25.0554006°S 51.7411278°W	19:30	12 km (7.5 mi)	675 m (738 yd)
F2	Extensive damage was reported. Two wooden houses were destroyed and a restaurant had its more fragile masonry walls collapse. PREVOTS and Simepar rated the tornado as F2.					
F1	Faxinal, Mauá da Serra, Paraná	BR	Unknown	Unknown	Unknown	Unknown
F1	Several properties had their roofs torn off, trees and poles were knocked over, and vehicles were flipped. Some of the damage, was also caused by a microburst.					
F2	Marilândia do Sul, Paraná	BR	Unknown	~23:20	Unknown	Unknown
F2	More than five trees fell and several houses had their roofs blown off. In a part of the rural area, greenhouses, walls, and utility poles were knocked down or damaged, in addition to sheds and residences having their roofs torn off. This tornado was rated F2 by PREVOTS.					

== December ==
Confirmed tornadoes by Fujita rating
FU	F0	F1	F2	F3	F4	F5	Total
0	0	5	1	0	0	0	6

=== December 7 ===
List of confirmed tornadoes - Sunday, December 7 2025
F#	Location	Country	Start coord.	Time (UTC-3)	Path length	Max width
F1	Rio das Pedras, São Paulo	BR	Unknown	19:21	Unknown	Unknown
A nighttime tornado was filmed in city's rural area and confirmed by PREVOTS.
F1	Mombuca, São Paulo	BR	22.9397222°S 47.5513889°W	Unknown	Unknown	Unknown
Another nighttime tornado struck the city's rural area and was confirmed by PREVOTS in 2026. Significant damage to the root system of a young sugarcane field suggests an F1 tornado.

=== December 8 ===
List of confirmed tornadoes - Monday, December 8 2025
F#	Location	Country	Start coord.	Time (UTC-3)	Path length	Max width
F2	Flores da Cunha, Rio Grande do Sul	BR	Unknown	Unknown	Unknown	Unknown
A significant tornado struck the municipality of Flores da Cunha, in Rio Grande do Sul. Houses had their roofs torn off, trees were uprooted, more than 20 vineyards were destroyed, and the city's cafeteria and hospital were damaged. No one was injured. Classified as low-end F2.

=== December 12 ===
List of confirmed tornadoes - Friday, December 12 2025
F#	Location	Country	Start coord.	Time (UTC-3)	Path length	Max width
F1	Teodoro Sampaio, São Paulo	BR	Unknown	Unknown	Unknown	Unknown
A tornado struck the municipality of Teodoro Sampaio, in São Paulo. It lasted a short time and only caused damage to the city's cemetery, breaking or uprooting trees. Damage suggests an F0 and F1 tornado.

=== December 21 ===
List of confirmed tornadoes - Sunday, December 21 2025
F#	Location	Country	Start coord.	Time (UTC-3)	Path length	Max width
F1	Alto Paraná	PY	Unknown	Unknown	Unknown	Unknown
A brief and weak tornado formed on Santa Rita in Paraguay and caused minor damages to rural structures, rated as F1 by Dirección de Meteorología e Hidrología (DMH).

=== December 28 ===
List of confirmed tornadoes - Sunday, December 28 2025
F#	Location	Country	Start coord.	Time (UTC-3)	Path length	Max width
F1	Farroupilha	BR	Unknown	Unknown	Unknown	Unknown
A high precipitation brief tornado formed in Farroupilha causing damage to house roofs, weak structures and homes. Metsul estimated an F1 rating.

== See also ==
- Tornadoes of 2025
  - 2025 Rio Bonito do Iguaçu tornado
- Fujita scale
