= 2025 Southern Brazil tornado outbreak =

Tornado outbreak in Brazil

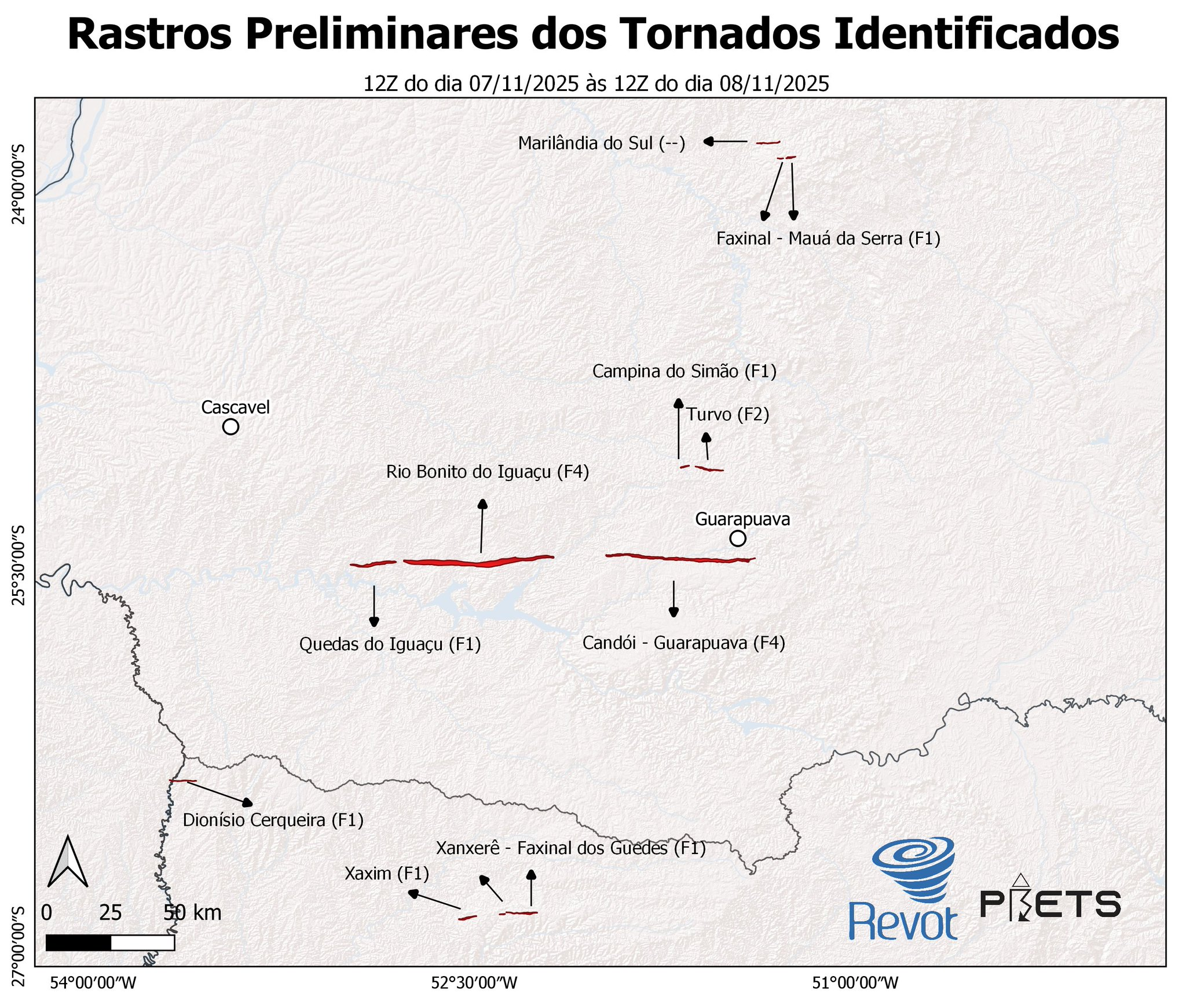
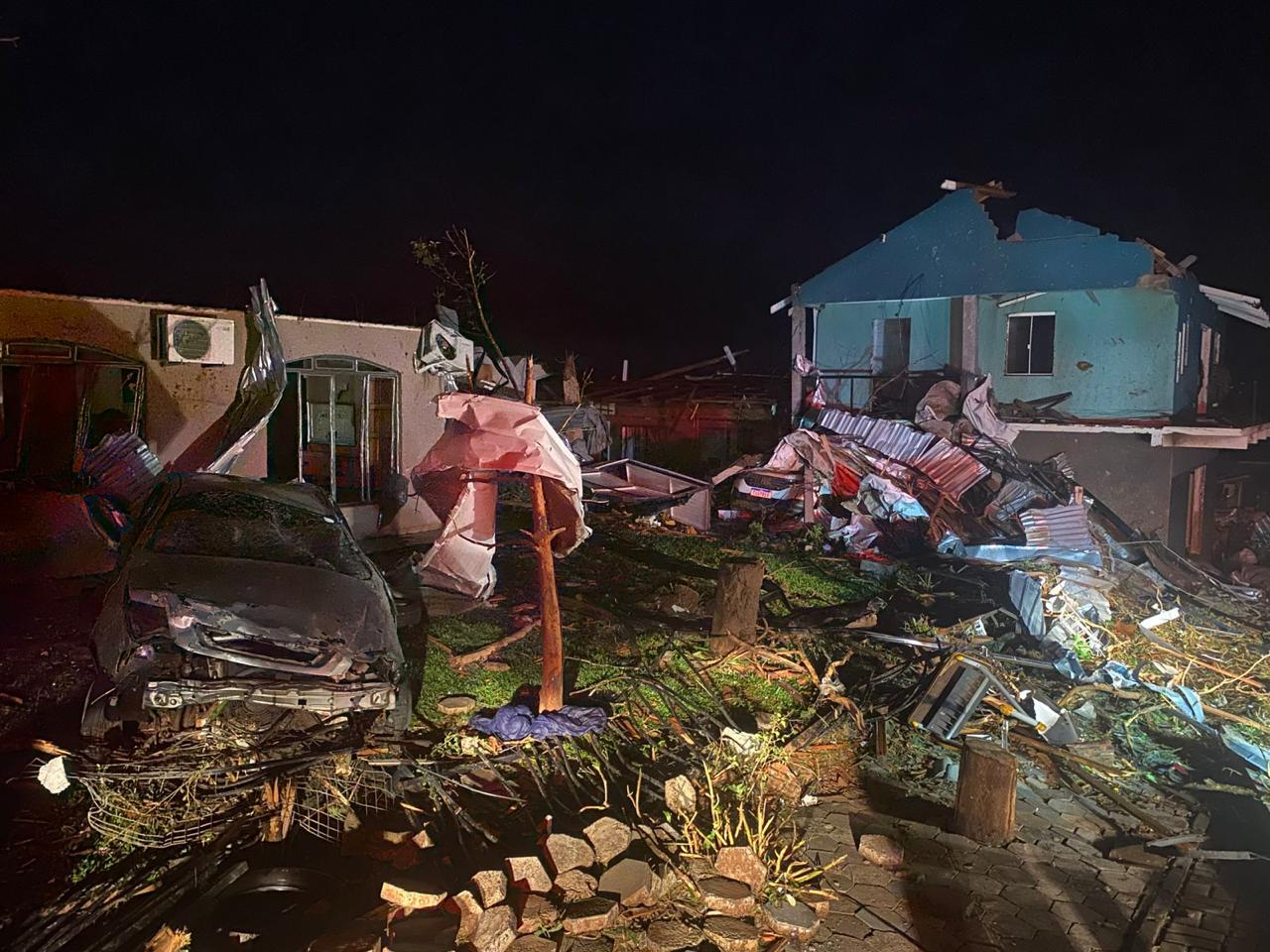
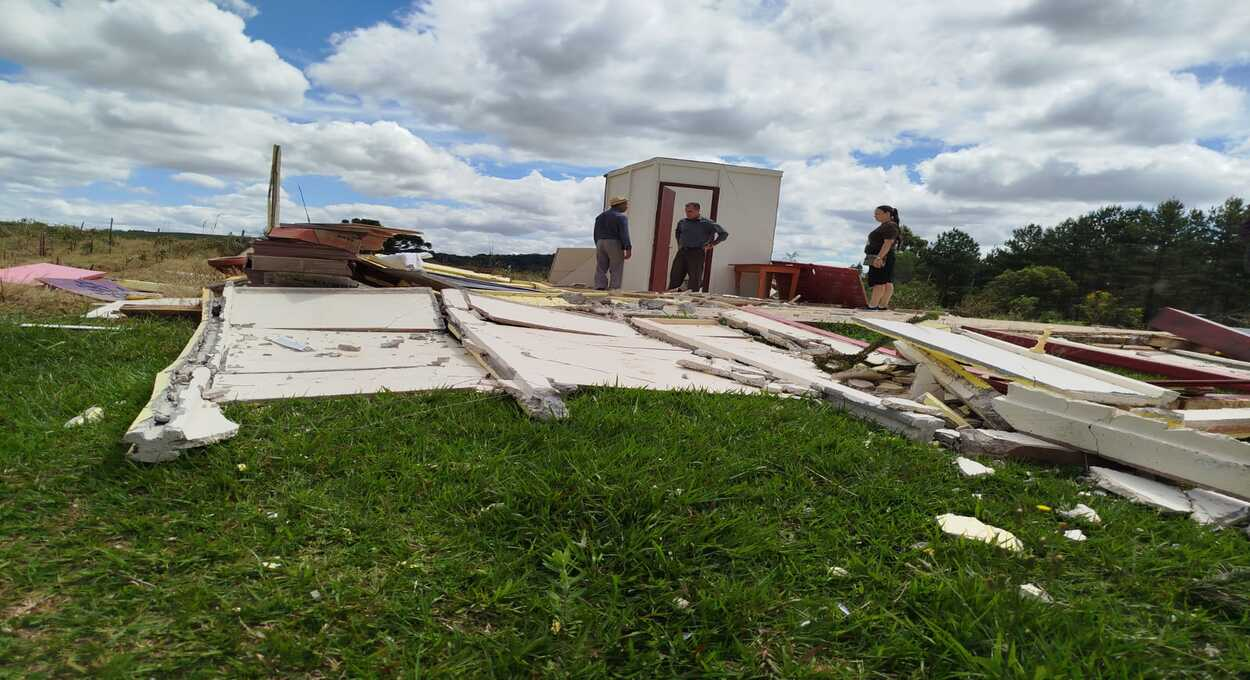
- Clockwise from top: The preliminary path of all identified tornadoes; A church destroyed by the tornado that struck Guarapuava, Houses and a vehicle damaged by The tornado that struck Rio Bonito do Iguaçu

Meteorological history
- Date: November 7, 2025

Tornado outbreak
- Tornadoes: 11
- Max. rating: F4 tornado

Overall effects
- Fatalities: 7 total (6 tornadic, 1 non-tornadic)
- Injuries: ~859
- Part of the Tornadoes of 2025

During the afternoon through evening of November 7, 2025, a relatively rare tornado outbreak occurred in the South Region of Brazil. The outbreak produced many tornadoes off of a cold front associated with an extratropical cyclone, most notably two violent tornadoes that were spawned from the same supercell. The first and more impactful of these tornadoes directly impacted the municipality of Rio Bonito do Iguaçu in Paraná, resulting in 90% of structures being damaged or destroyed, killing five, and injuring 835 people. The second violent tornado killed an additional person and cause extreme vegetation damage near Candói.

== Meteorological synopsis ==
According to Simepar and MetSul Meteorologia, the tornado in Rio Bonito do Iguaçu was caused by the interaction between a mass of warm, humid air coming from the north of the country and a strong cold front advancing through the south, driven by an extratropical cyclone. The atmospheric conditions favored the formation of a supercell.

The warm air that was over southern Brazil, coming from the Amazon rainforest, increased thermodynamic instability, which was also intensified by the sharp drop in temperature, enabling the formation of other storms in the region, including at least three other tornadoes in the neighboring state of Santa Catarina.

In addition to the squall line produced by the cyclone, other determining factors for the formation of the tornado were low level jets directed westward across Santa Catarina and Paraná, increasing vertical wind shear and thus favoring tornadogenesis.

== Confirmed tornadoes ==
Confirmed tornadoes by Fujita rating
| FU | F0 | F1 | F2 | F3 | F4 | F5 | Total |
|---|---|---|---|---|---|---|---|
| 0 | 1 | 6 | 2 | 0 | 2 | 0 | 11 |

List of confirmed tornadoes – Friday, November 7, 2025
| F# | Location | State | Start coord. | Time (UTC) | Path length | Max. width |
|---|---|---|---|---|---|---|
| F1 | Dionísio Cerqueria | SC | Unknown | Unknown | Unknown | Unknown |
| F1 | 4 injuries – This tornado caused damage to approximately 60 homes. There were reports of roofs being torn off and trees falling. Damage was reported at a school and a church. | | | | | |
| F1 | Xaxim | SC | Unknown | ~16:00 | Unknown | Unknown |
| F1 | Supercellular tornado rated by PREVOTS, but information is scarce. | | | | | |
| F1 | Xanxerê, Faxinal dos Guedes | SC | Unknown | ~17:00 | Unknown | Unknown |
| F1 | Partial destruction of structures was reported, along with vehicle damage and a bus being flipped over. 164 houses had received tarpaulins. | | | | | |
| F1 | Quedas do Iguaçu | PR | Unknown | Unknown | Unknown | Unknown |
| F1 | Another supercellular tornado rated by PREVOTS, but information is scarce. | | | | | |
| F4 | Quedas do Iguaçu, Espigão Alto do Iguaçu, Nova Laranjeiras, Rio Bonito do Iguaçu, Porto Barreiro, Laranjeiras do Sul, Virmond, Cantagalo | PR | ~25.4525149°S 52.9071011°W | 17:30 | 75 km (47 mi) | 3,250 m (3,550 yd) |
| F4 | 6 deaths, 835 injuries – See article on this tornado | | | | | |
| F4 | Candói, Guarapuava | PR | ~25.5515547°S 52.0274396°W | ~18:00 | 44 km (27 mi) | 1,160 m (1,270 yd) |
| F4 | 1 death – See section on this tornado – Extreme sweeping of dense hardwood trees were found at two points along the path of this tornado. Ground scouring was also noted at these points. A large commercial container was hurled 165 m (180 yd). | | | | | |
| F1 | Campina do Simão | PR | Unknown | Unknown | Unknown | Unknown |
| F1 | Another supercellular tornado rated by PREVOTS, but information is scarce. | | | | | |
| F2 | Turvo | PR | ~25.0554006°S 51.7411278°W | 19:30 | 12 km (7.5 mi) | 675 m (738 yd) |
| F2 | Extensive damage was reported. Two wooden houses were destroyed and a restaurant had its more fragile masonry walls collapse. PREVOTS and Simepar rated the tornado as F2. | | | | | |
| F2 | Marilândia do Sul | PR | Unknown | Unknown | Unknown | Unknown |
| F2 | More than five trees fell and several houses had their roofs blown off. In a part of the rural area, greenhouses, walls, and utility poles were knocked down or damaged, in addition to sheds and residences having their roofs torn off. Tornado upgraded to F2 after further review by PREVOTS. | | | | | |
| F1 | Faxinal, Mauá da Serra | PR | Unknown | Unknown | Unknown | Unknown |
| F1 | Several properties had their roofs torn off, trees and poles were knocked over, and vehicles were flipped. Some of the damage, was also caused by a microburst. | | | | | |
| F0 | Guaraniaçu, Nova Laranjeiras | PR | Unknown | Unknown | Unknown | Unknown |
| F0 | Another supercellular tornado rated by PREVOTS, but information is scarce. | | | | | |

=== Rio Bonito do Iguaçu, Paraná ===
Rio Bonito do Iguaçu, Paraná
- A view of the tornado from a security camera near Rio Bonito do Iguaçu.

Meteorological history
- Date: November 7, 2025

F4 tornado
- on the Fujita scale
- Highest winds: 333–418 km/h (207–260 mph)

Overall effects
- Fatalities: 5 (+1 indirect)
- Injuries: 835

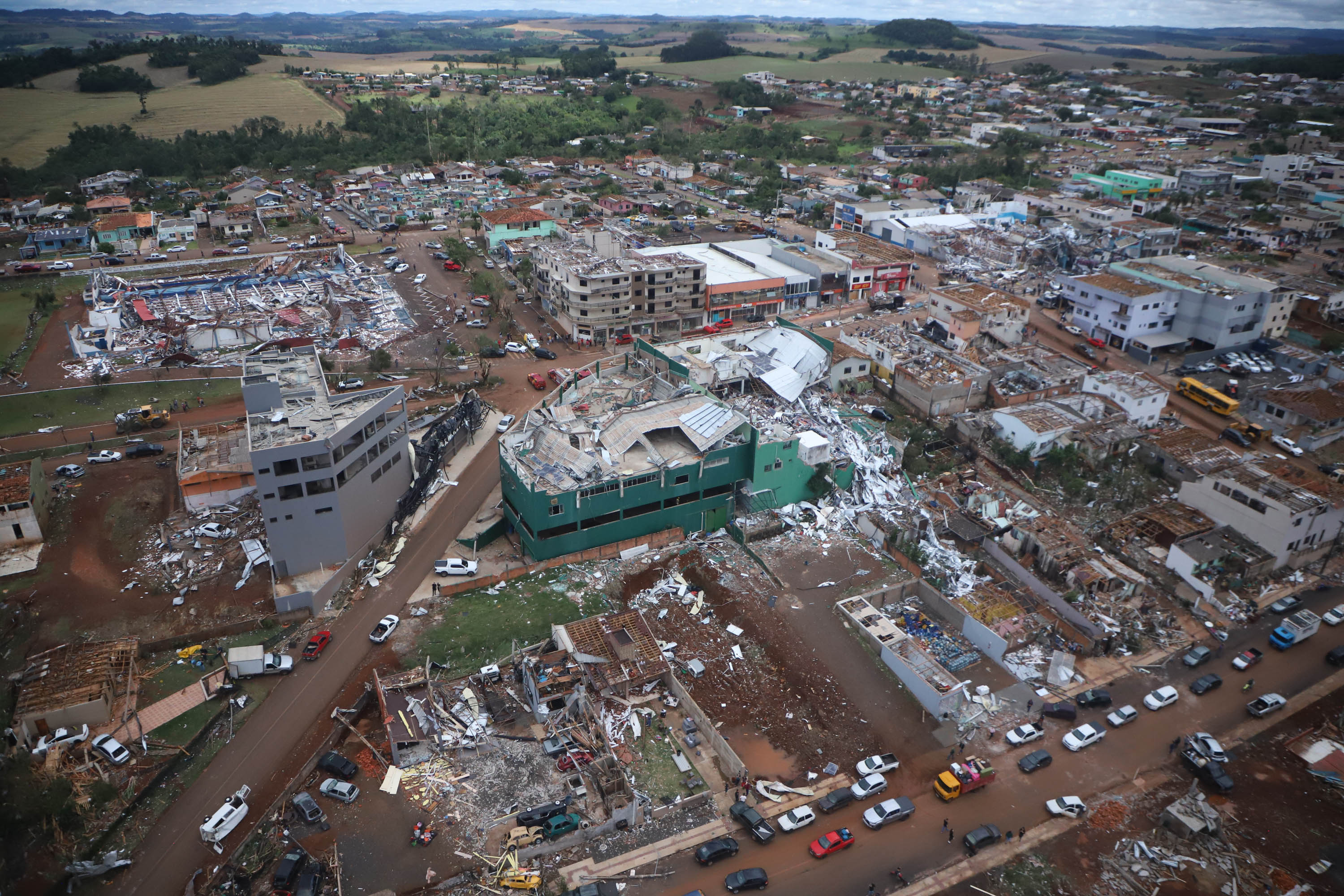
Aerial view of tornado damage in Rio Bonito do Iguaçu

This violent, enormous and destructive tornado caused widespread destruction in the urban and rural areas of the municipality. According to the governor of Paraná, Ratinho Júnior, about 90% of the homes in Rio Bonito do Iguaçu were partially or totally destroyed. Of the impacted homes, it is estimated about 40% of them will need to be completely demolished and rebuilt.

The tornado killed at least six people (one indirectly) and injured 835 others. Among the victims was a 14-year-old girl who died from her injuries after the house where she was sheltering with her family collapsed. A supermarket also collapsed, trapping multiple people under debris. About 1,000 people were displaced, and approximately 4,000 people were affected directly or indirectly in total.

Several schools in the city suffered severe structural damage, and 22 of the 30 school buses available were also damaged by the storm, affecting more than 2,000 students. Classes were temporarily suspended for over 1,900 students in schools run by the state government. The Exame Nacional do Ensino Médio (ENEM), originally planned for 9 and 16 November, was cancelled in the city.

The tornado had widespread national and international repercussions, being described by meteorologists as one of the most intense ever recorded in Paraná. MetSul highlighted that the occurrence of an F4 tornado in southern Brazil is a rare event, comparable only to a few documented cases in recent decades.

=== Candói–Guarapuava, Paraná ===
Candói–Guarapuava, Paraná
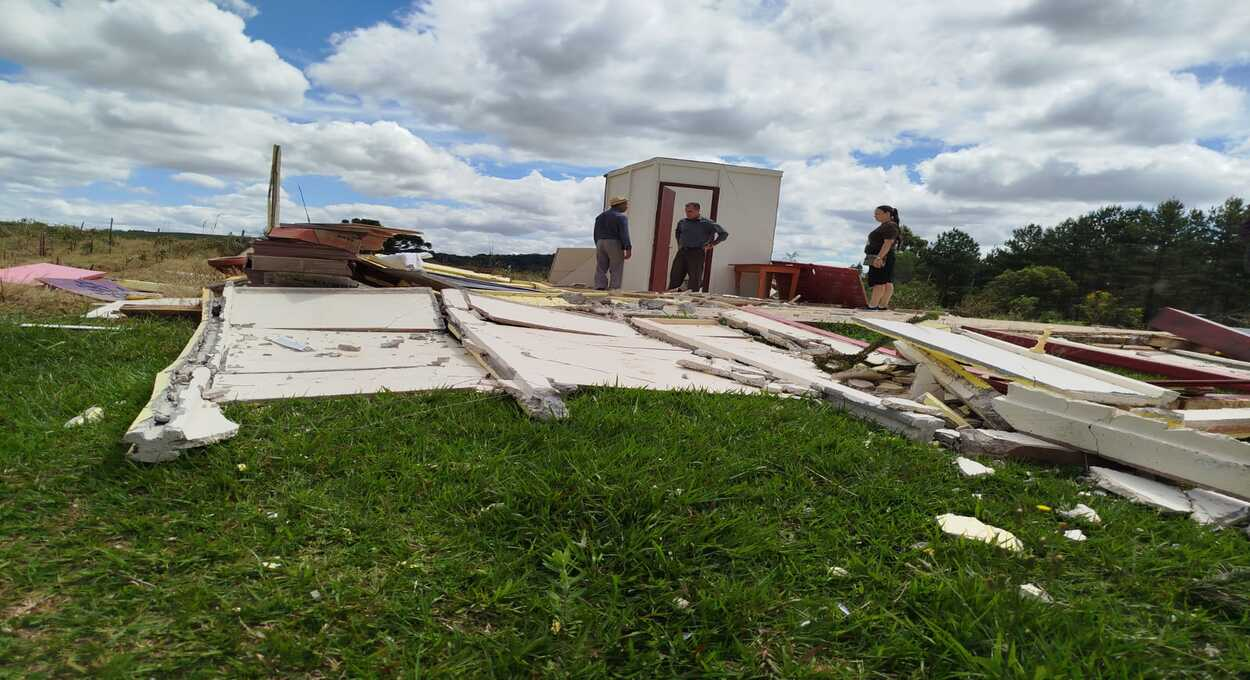
- A church completely destroyed by the tornado.

Meteorological history
- Date: November 7, 2025

F4 tornado
- on the Fujita scale
- Highest winds: 333–418 km/h (207–260 mph)

Overall effects
- Fatalities: 1
- Injuries: 20

This extremely destructive and large tornado, was formed from the same supercell as the other F4 tornado which had occluded before forming a new circulation, resulting on this tornado forming on the Entre Rios district.

This tornado swept away >80% of native vegetation, composed by hardwood trees, debarking and uprooting was also noted. Various homes including a church were obliterated, ground scouring was also found at these points, the tornado also threw a commercial container 165 m (180 yd) away and almost completely destroyed a well-built mansion, a man also died due to his house collapsing on him.

All these factors leaded to upgrading the tornado rating from F3 to F4, making this the first occurrence in South America of two violent tornadoes in a single day since the 2009 Brazil and Argentina tornado outbreak.

== See also ==
- List of F4, EF4, and IF4 tornadoes (2020–present)
- List of Brazil tornadoes
- List of South American tornadoes and tornado outbreaks
