= 2025 Rio Bonito do Iguaçu tornado =

F4 tornado in Paraná, Brazil

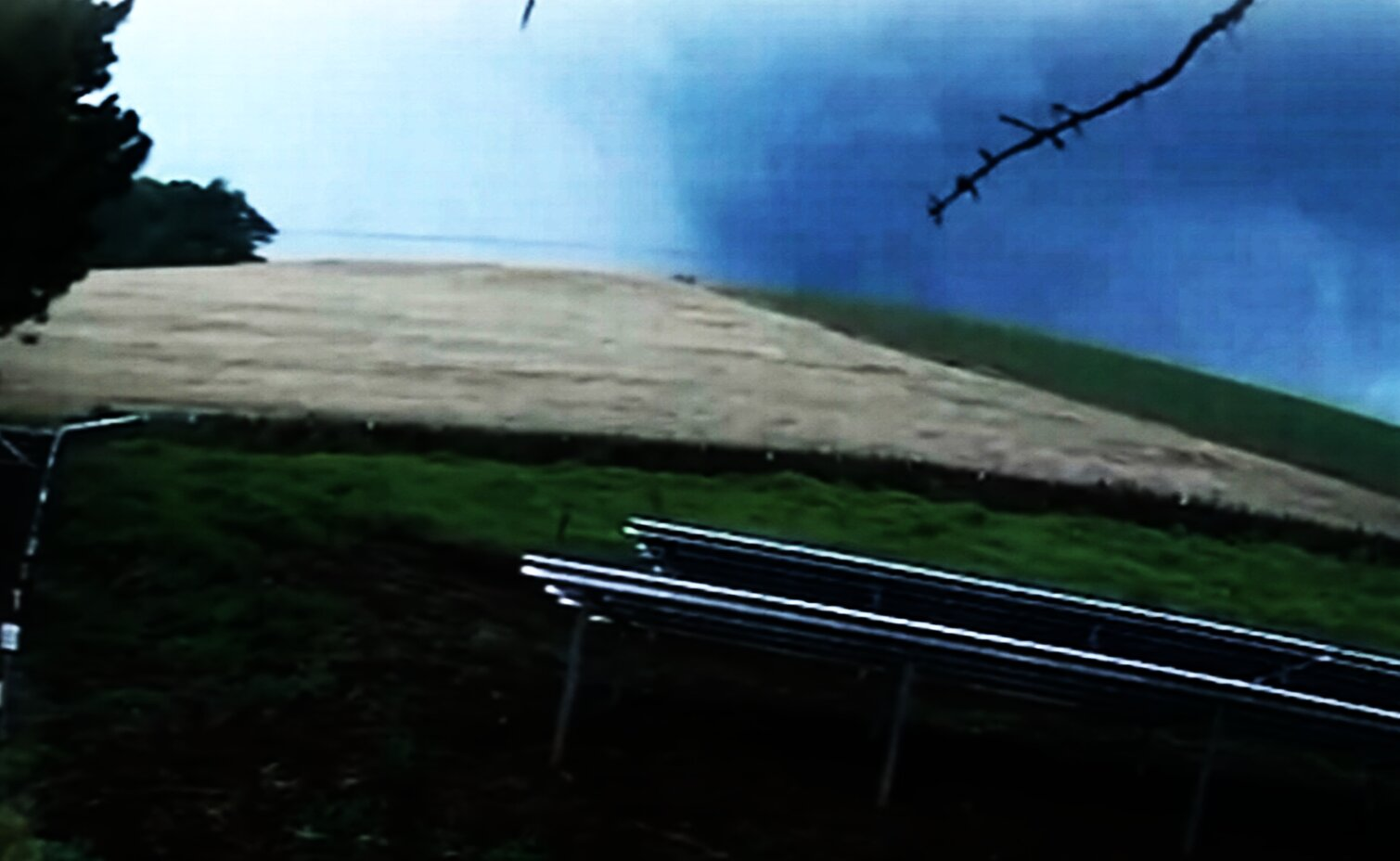
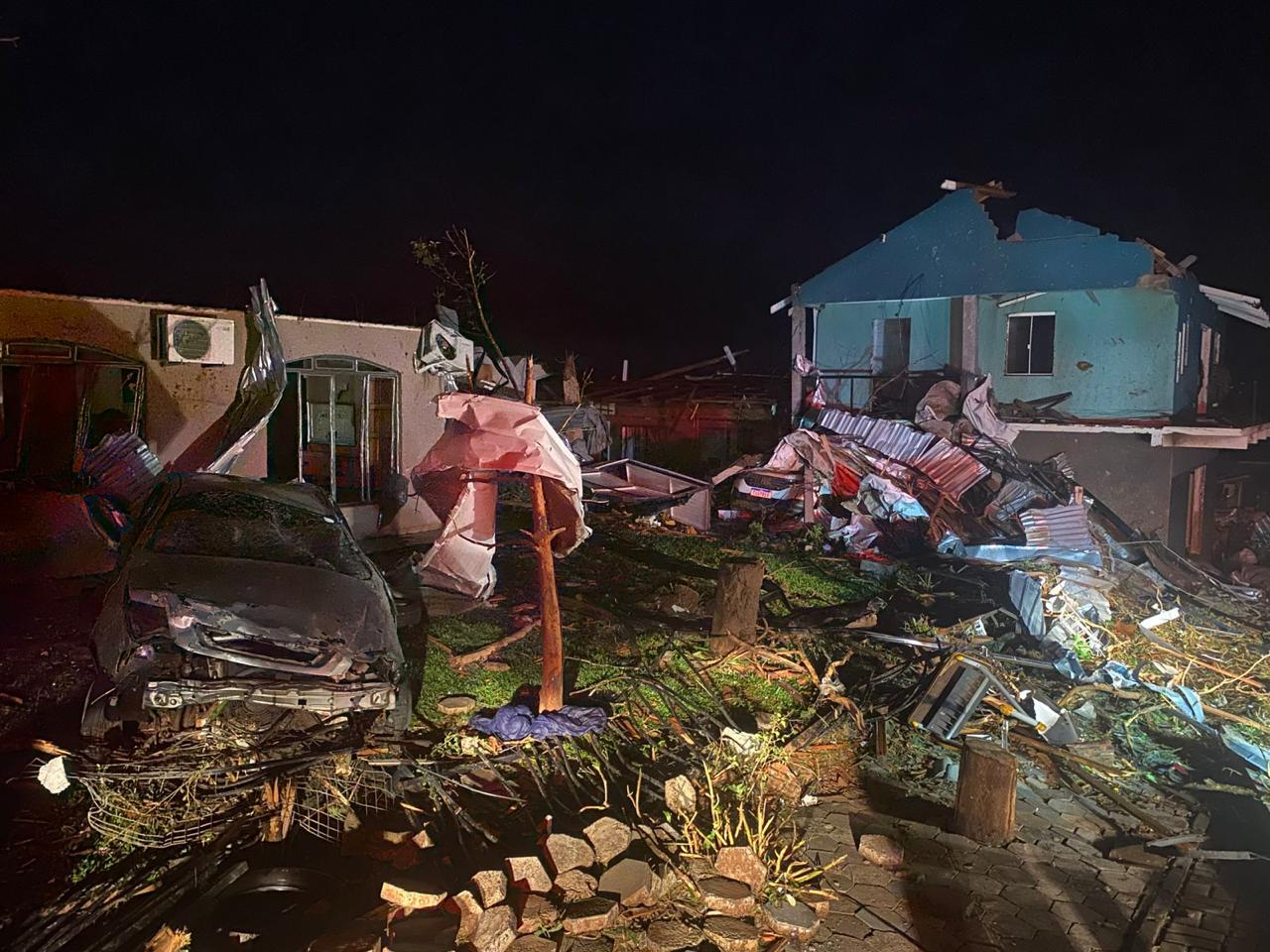
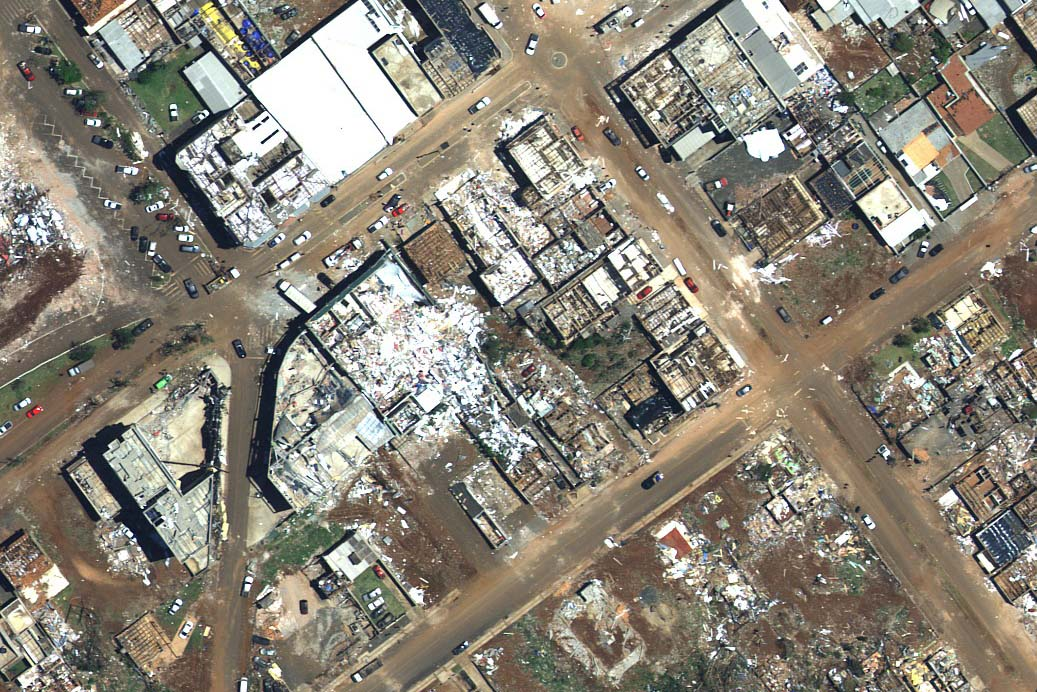
- Clockwise from top: The tornado seen by a security camera; The same supercell that would produce the tornado seen approaching Rio Bonito do Iguaçu; Aerial view of the damage caused by the tornado; Houses and a vehicle damaged by the tornado

Meteorological history
- Date: 7 November 2025
- Formed: 5:30 pm (UTC-3)

F4 tornado
- on the Fujita scale
- Max width: 3,250 metres (3,550 yd; 2.02 mi)
- Path length: 75 km (47 mi)
- Highest winds: 333–418 km/h (207–260 mph)

Overall effects
- Fatalities: 5 (+1 indirect)
- Injuries: 835
- Damage: >R$114 million
- Areas affected: Rio Bonito do Iguaçu, Paraná, Brazil
- Part of the 2025 Southern Brazil tornado outbreak and Tornadoes of 2025

During the evening hours of November 7, 2025, a destructive and extremely large tornado devastated the municipality of Rio Bonito do Iguaçu in Paraná, Brazil, killing five people (one indirectly), injuring 835 others, and causing widespread damage. The tornado traveled 75 km (47 miles) and had a peak width of 3,250 m (3,550 yd) or 2.02 mi (3.25 km). The tornado was rated F4 on the Fujita scale by PREVOTS, MetSul Meteorologia, and SIMEPAR. The same storm went on to produce another violent F4 tornado that struck nearby Guarapuava and Candói, killing a sixth person. Another man died of acute heart failure the next day due to post-traumatic stress caused by the tornado.

== Meteorological synopsis ==
According to Simepar and MetSul Meteorologia, the tornado was caused by the interaction between a mass of warm, humid air coming from the north of the country and a strong cold front advancing through the south, driven by an extratropical cyclone. The atmospheric conditions favored the formation of a supercell.

The warm air that was over southern Brazil, coming from the Amazon rainforest, increased thermodynamic instability, which was also intensified by the sharp drop in temperature, enabling the formation of other storms in the region, including at least three other tornadoes in the neighboring state of Santa Catarina.

In addition to the squall line produced by the cyclone, other determining factors for the formation of the tornado were low level jets directed westward across Santa Catarina and Paraná, increasing vertical wind shear and thus favoring tornadogenesis.

The supercell that produced the Rio Bonito do Iguaçu tornado formed in the nearby municipality of Quedas do Iguaçu, to the west. After forming, the tornado traveled eastwards, gaining intensity before striking Rio Bonito with a width estimated at 800 to 1,000 metres, and dissipated within another neighboring municipality after covering an estimated distance of 40 km. This supercell also produced another F4 tornado in Guarapuava that killed a sixth person. A second supercell formed over the municipality of Ibema before moving east and producing another F2 tornado over Turvo, causing some damage to forests and homes.

== Impact ==
A security camera time-lapse showing the tornado.

The tornado caused widespread destruction in the urban and rural areas of the municipality. According to the governor of Paraná, Ratinho Júnior, about 90% of the homes in Rio Bonito do Iguaçu were partially or totally destroyed. Of the impacted homes, it is estimated about 40% of them will need to be completely demolished and rebuilt.

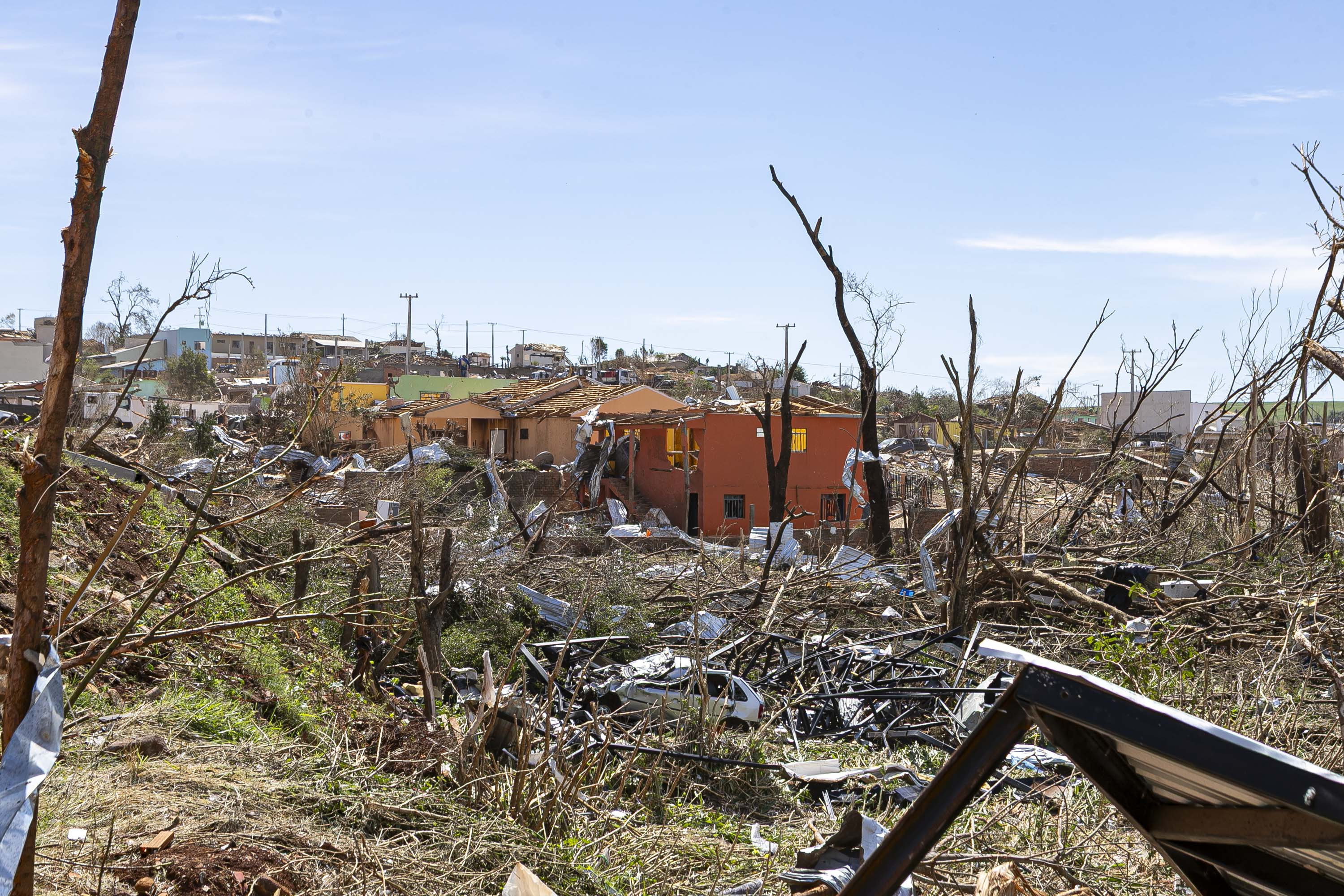
Extensive damage in Rio Bonito do Iguaçu.

The tornado killed at least six people (one indirectly) and injured 835 others. Among the victims was a 14-year-old girl who died from her injuries after the house where she was sheltering with her family collapsed. A supermarket also collapsed, trapping multiple people under debris. About 1,000 people were displaced, and approximately 4,000 people were affected directly or indirectly in total.

Several schools in the city suffered severe structural damage, and 22 of the 30 school buses available were also damaged by the storm, affecting more than 2,000 students. Classes were temporarily suspended for over 1,900 students in schools run by the state government. The Exame Nacional do Ensino Médio (Enem), originally planned for 9 and 16 November, was cancelled in the city.

The tornado had widespread national and international repercussions, being described by meteorologists as one of the most intense ever recorded in Paraná. MetSul highlighted that the occurrence of an F4 tornado in southern Brazil is a rare event, comparable only to a few documented cases in recent decades.

== Aftermath ==
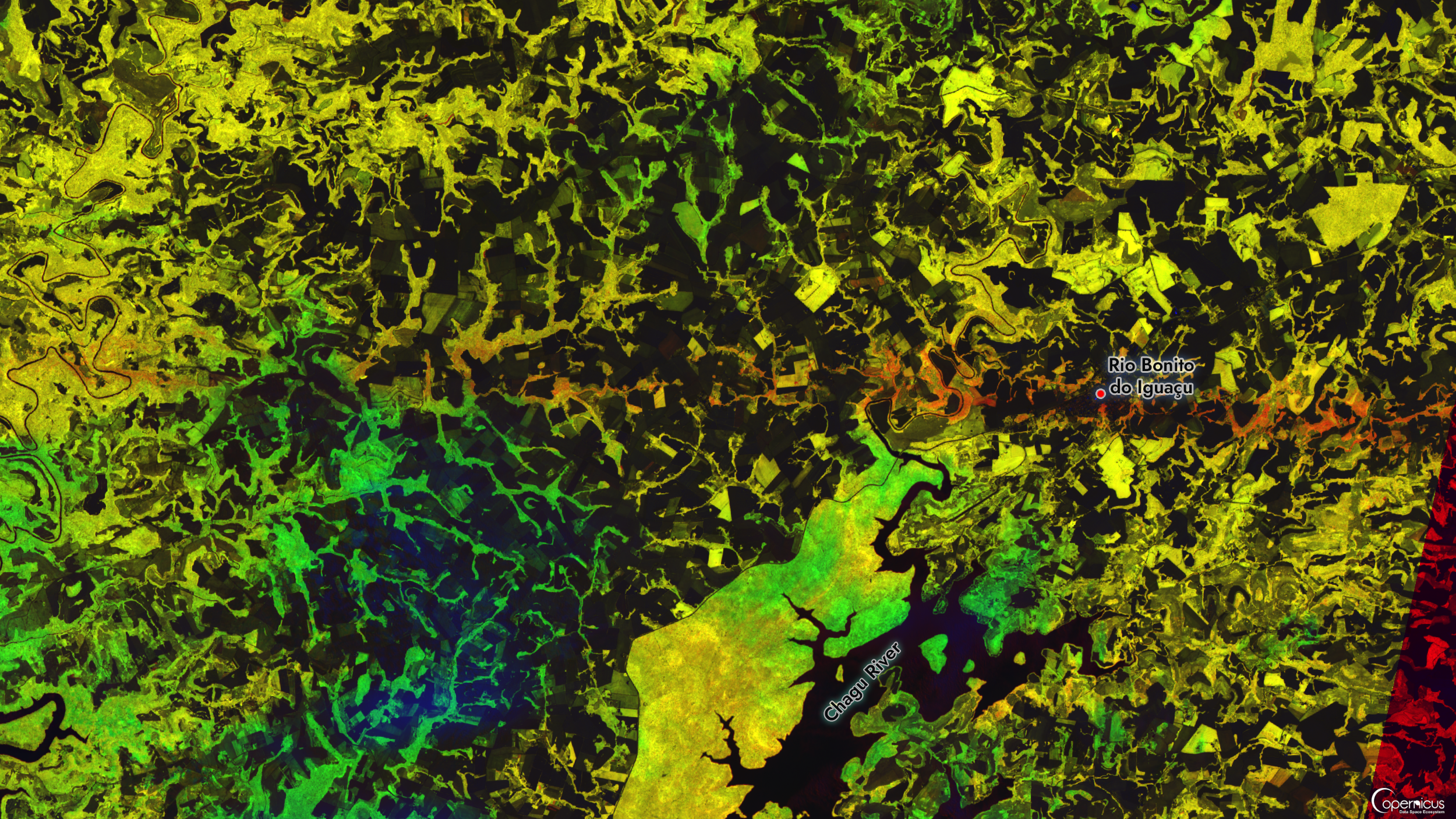
Sentinel-2 composite image showing the scar left by the tornado as it tracked east, visible as a reddish-brown horizontal line near the middle.

Teams from the state's Civil Defense service, the Firefighters Corps and the Brazilian Army were deployed to the municipality in the first few hours after the disaster. Searches for victims were carried out among the rubble throughout the weekend. The state government sent trucks with food, blankets, and drinking water, as well as equipment to restore electricity.

Temporary shelters were set up in gyms and schools in the region. Nearby hospitals, such as those in Laranjeiras do Sul and Guarapuava, received seriously injured people. Governor Ratinho Júnior declared a state of emergency and announced financial support for the reconstruction of the most affected areas.

Initial estimates pointed to losses in the tens of millions of reals, although the exact amount has not yet been officially released.

Governor Ratinho Júnior led an emergency meeting at the Central Firefighter Corps Headquarters in state capital Curitiba regarding response to the disaster, stating "it is a unique catastrophe in the history of Paraná".

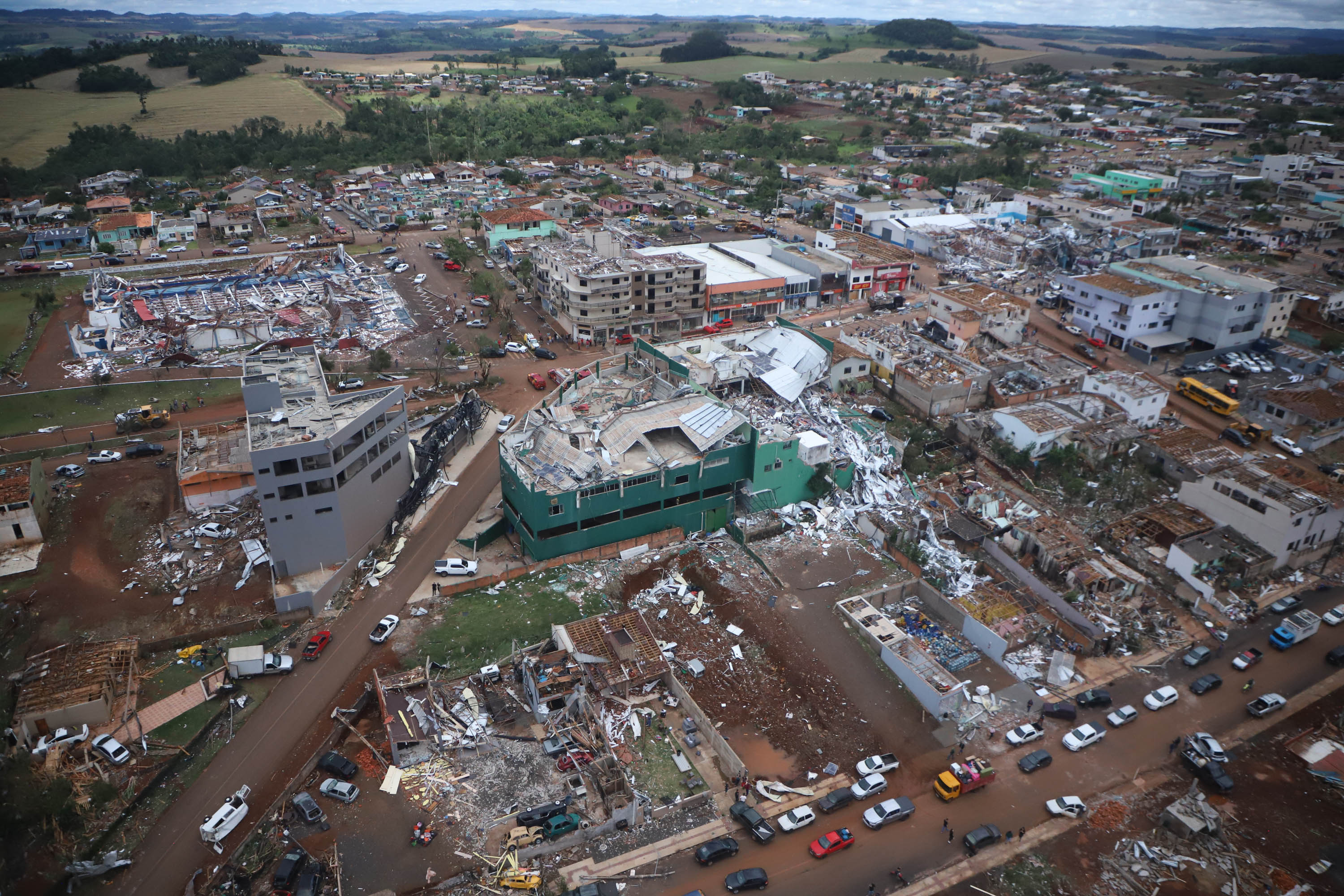
Aerial view damage tornado in Rio Bonito do Iguaçu

President of Brazil Luiz Inácio Lula da Silva sent his cabinet ministers to aid in the relief efforts.

On 10 November, the state government of Paraná announced emergency measures to aid the rebuilding of the city, including the emergency construction of 320 houses and the temporary suspension of power and water billing. The government also announced the destination of R$75,000 to the schools destroyed by the tornado, and passed an emergency bill to allow up to R$50 million from disaster relief funds to be directly sent to families affected for rebuilding their homes, for a maximum of R$50,000 per family.

== See also ==
- List of F4, EF4, and IF4 tornadoes (2020–present)
- List of Brazil tornadoes
- List of South American tornadoes and tornado outbreaks
