= Xavantina =

Coordinates: 27.0686°S 52.3419°W

- Municipality
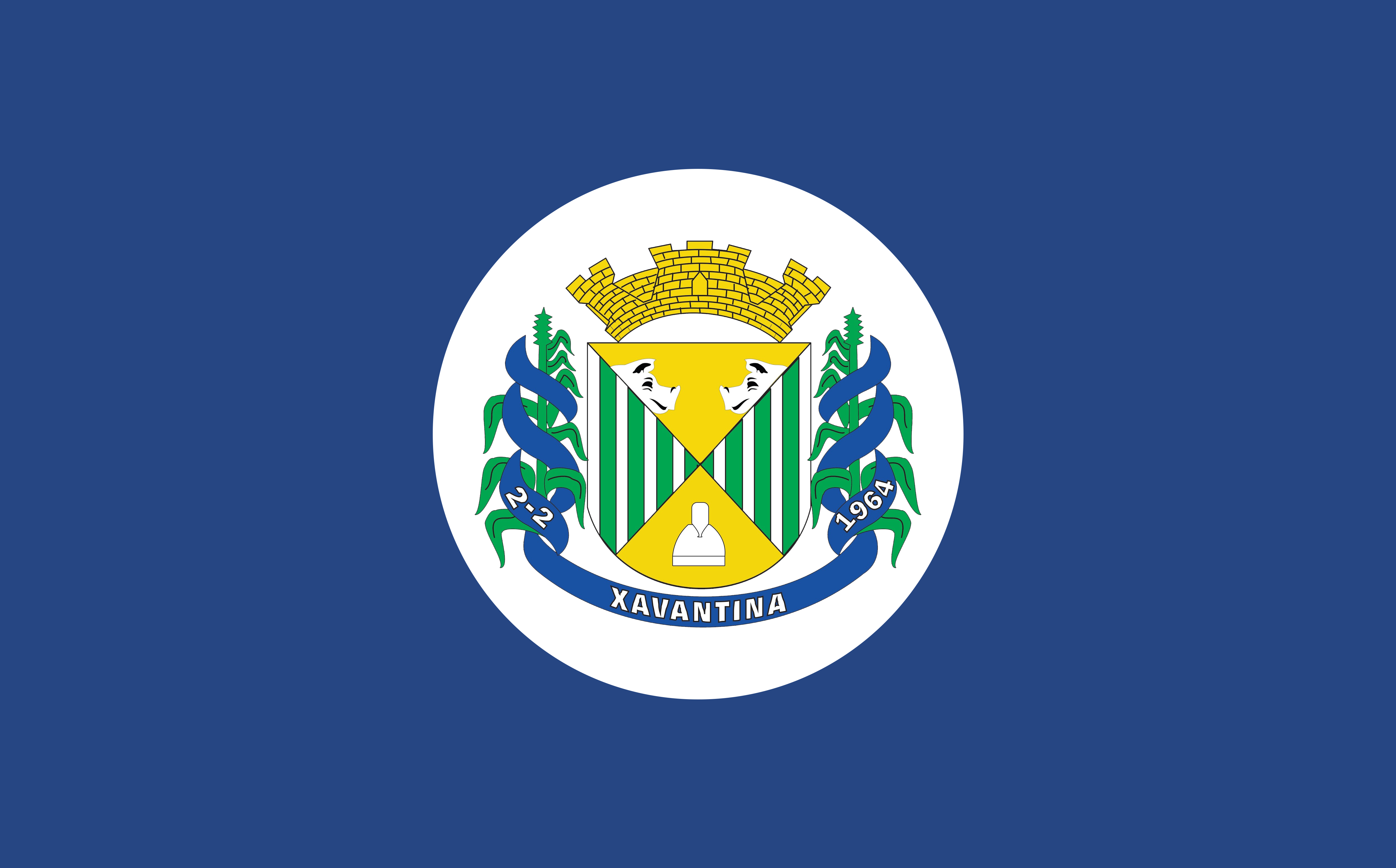
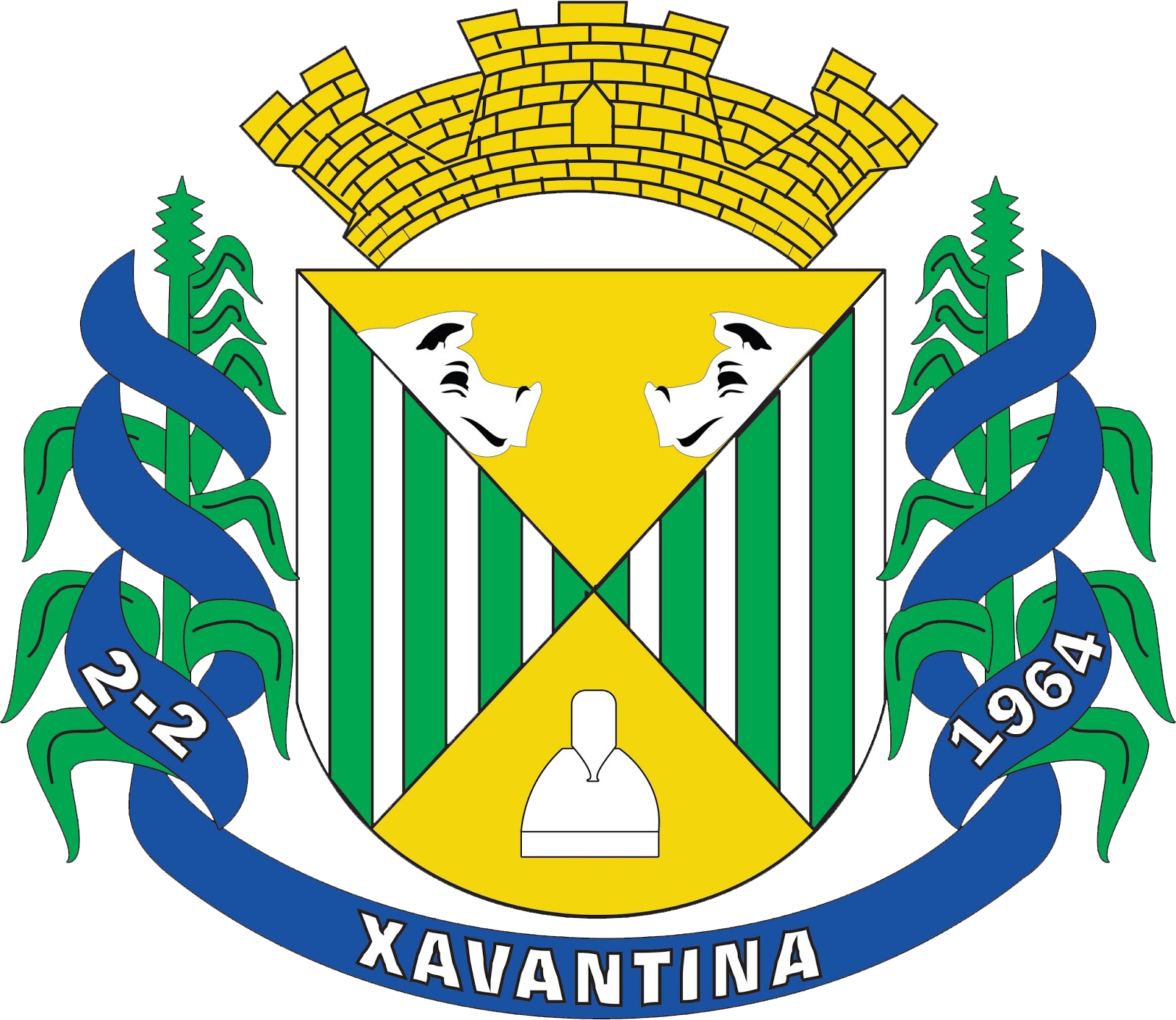
- Flag Coat of arms
- Interactive map of Xavantina
- Country: Brazil
- Region: South
- State: Santa Catarina
- Mesoregion: Oeste Catarinense

Population (2020)
  - Total: 3,903
- Time zone: UTC -3
- Website: www.xavantina.sc.gov.br

Xavantina is a municipality in the state of Santa Catarina in the South region of Brazil.

== See also ==
- List of municipalities in Santa Catarina
