= Belmonte, Santa Catarina =

Belmonte
- Municipality of Santa Catarina, Brazil
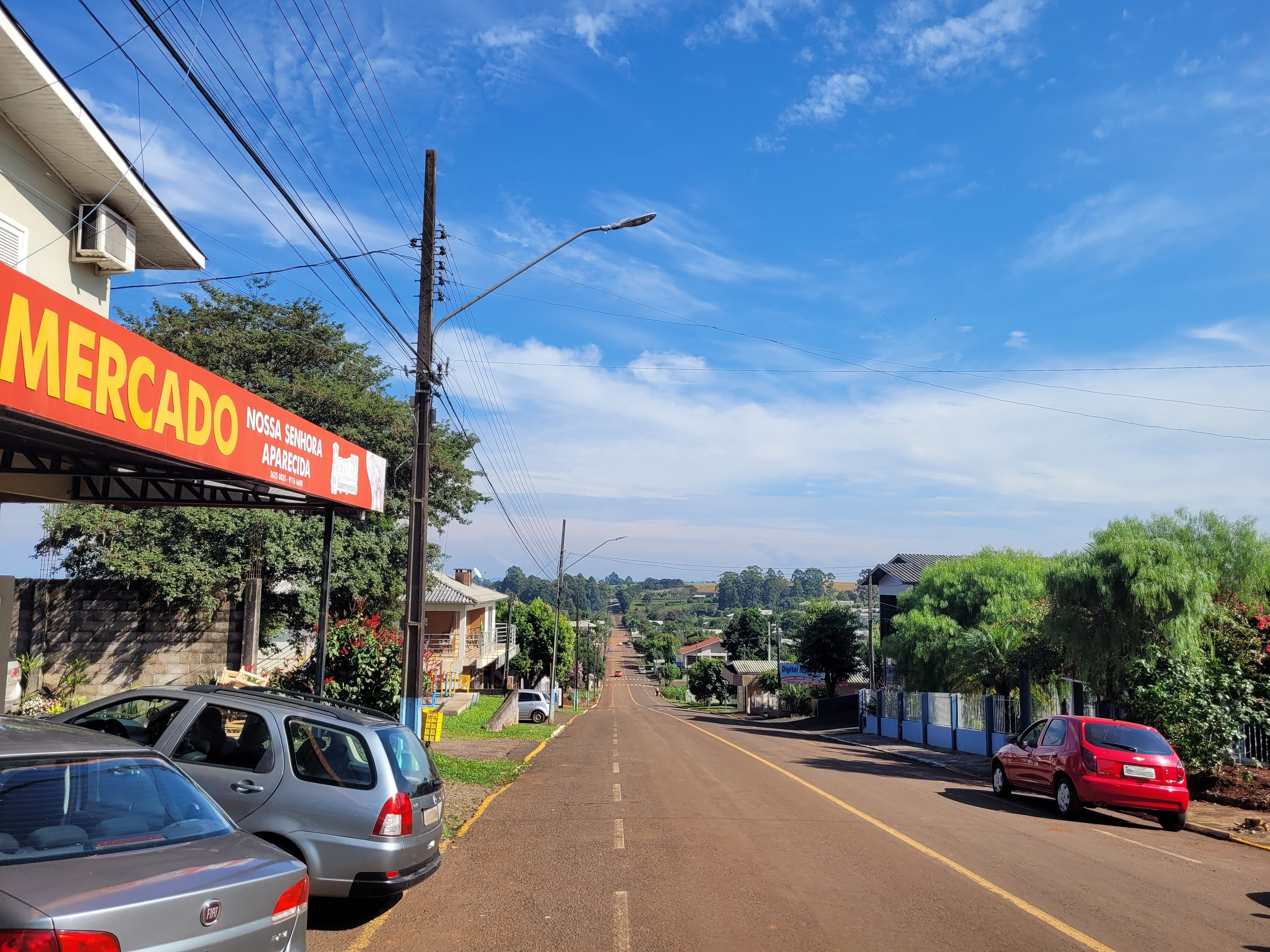
- Maurício Cardoso Street

- Flag Coat of arms

- Location of Belmonte in Santa Catarina

- Location within Brazil Location within South America
- Coordinates: 26°50′29″S 53°34′32″W
- Country: Brazil
- Region: South
- State: Santa Catarina
- Founded: 9 January 1992

Government
  - Mayor: Jair Antonio Giumbelli (PL) (2025-2028)
  - Vice Mayor: Cleonir Luiz Piton (MDB) (2025-2028)

Area
  - Total: 93.852 km^{2} (36.236 sq mi)
- Elevation: 490 m (1,610 ft)

Population (2022)
  - Total: 2,658
  - Density: 28.32/km^{2} (73.3/sq mi)
- Demonym: Belmontense (Brazilian Portuguese)
- Time zone: UTC-03:00 (Brasília Time)
- Postal code: 89925-000
- HDI (2010): 0.705 – high
- Website: belmonte.sc.gov.br

Belmonte is a municipality (município), in the Brazilian state of Santa Catarina. The name of the mayor is Genesio Bressain. It is located at 26º50'29" S, 53º34'32 W, and as of 2020 it has an estimated population of 2,709 inhabitants.
