= Guaraniaçu =

Coordinates: 25°06′S 52°52′W

- Municipality
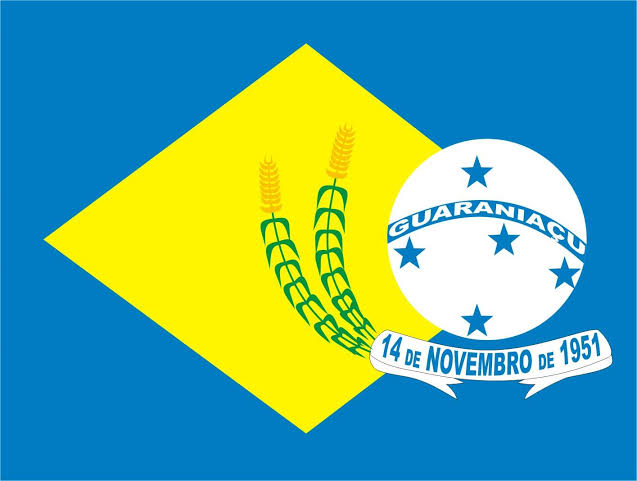
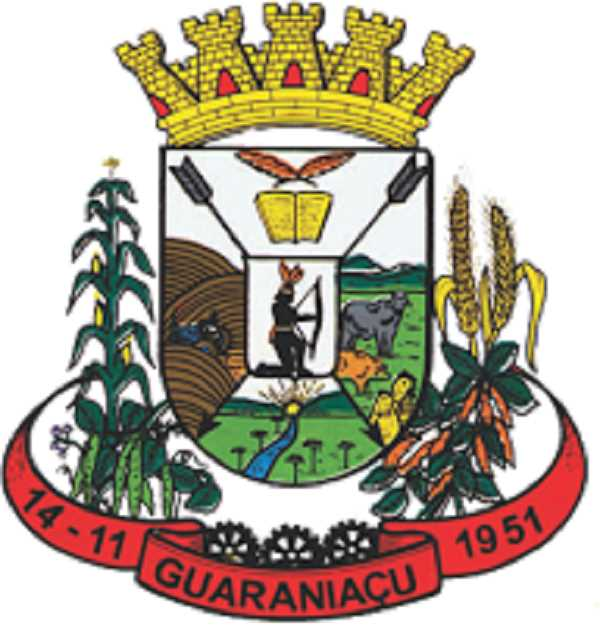
- Flag Coat of arms
- Interactive map of Guaraniaçu
- Country: Brazil
- Region: Southern
- State: Paraná
- Mesoregion: Oeste Paranaense

Population (2020)
  - Total: 12,217
- Time zone: UTC−3 (BRT)

Guaraniaçu is a municipality in the state of Paraná in the Southern Region of Brazil.

== See also ==
- List of municipalities in Paraná
