= Turvo, Paraná =

Coordinates: 25°2′34″S 51°31′48″W

Turvo
- Municipality
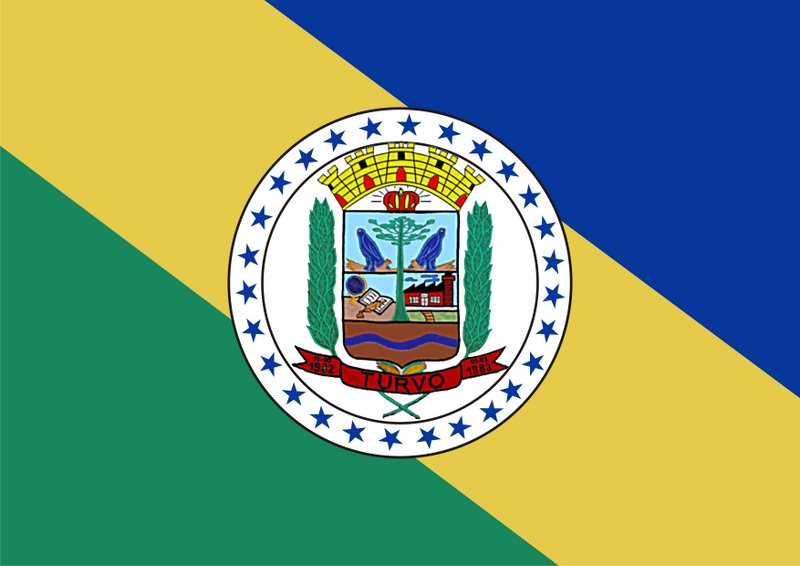
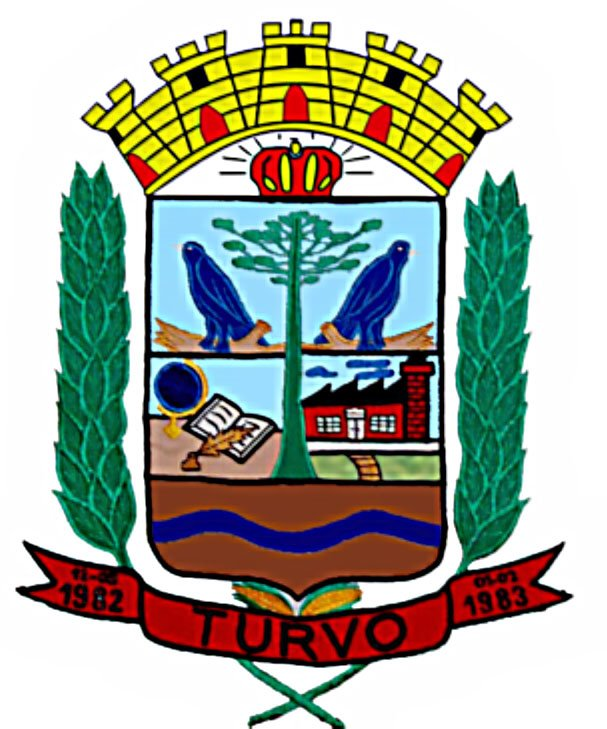
- Flag Coat of arms
- Interactive map of Turvo
- Country: Brazil
- Region: Southern
- State: Paraná
- Mesoregion: Centro-Sul Paranaense

Population (2020)
  - Total: 13,095
- Time zone: UTC−3 (BRT)

Turvo is a municipality in the state of Paraná in the Southern Region of Brazil.

== History ==
Turvo became municipality in 1 February 1983.

== Climate ==
Turvo has oceanic climate (Köppen: Cfb), The average temperature on summer are warm, it reaches 22°C, on winter it reaches 18°C. Frost are really common on winter.

== See also ==
- List of municipalities in Paraná
