= Santa Maria do Oeste =

Coordinates: 24.9389°S 51.8628°W

- Municipality
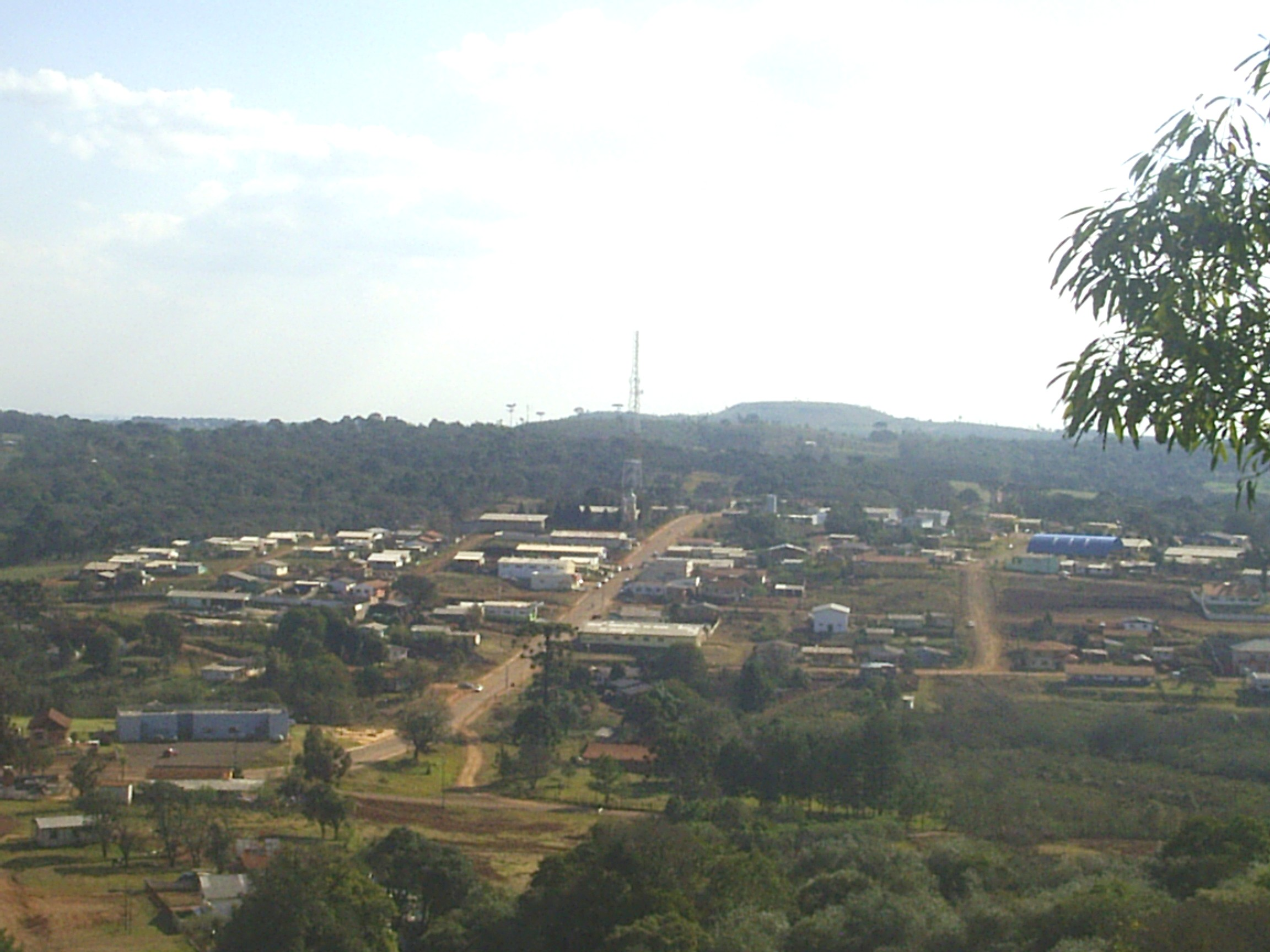

- Flag
- Interactive map of Santa Maria do Oeste
- Country: Brazil
- Region: Southern
- State: Paraná
- Mesoregion: Centro-Sul Paranaense

Population (2020)
  - Total: 9,410
- Time zone: UTC−3 (BRT)

Santa Maria do Oeste is a municipality in the state of Paraná in the Southern Region of Brazil.

== See also ==
- List of municipalities in Paraná
