= Erval Grande =

Municipality in Rio Grande do Sul, Brazil

Coordinates: 27°23′S 52°35′W

- Municipality
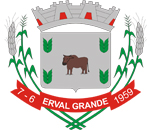
- Flag Coat of arms
- Interactive map of Erval Grande
- Country: Brazil
- Time zone: UTC−3 (BRT)

Erval Grande is a municipality in the state of Rio Grande do Sul, Brazil. As of 2020, the estimated population was 4,819.

== See also ==
- List of municipalities in Rio Grande do Sul
