= Rio Bonito do Iguaçu =

Coordinates: 25.4908°S 52.5258°W

- Municipality
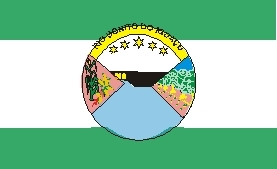
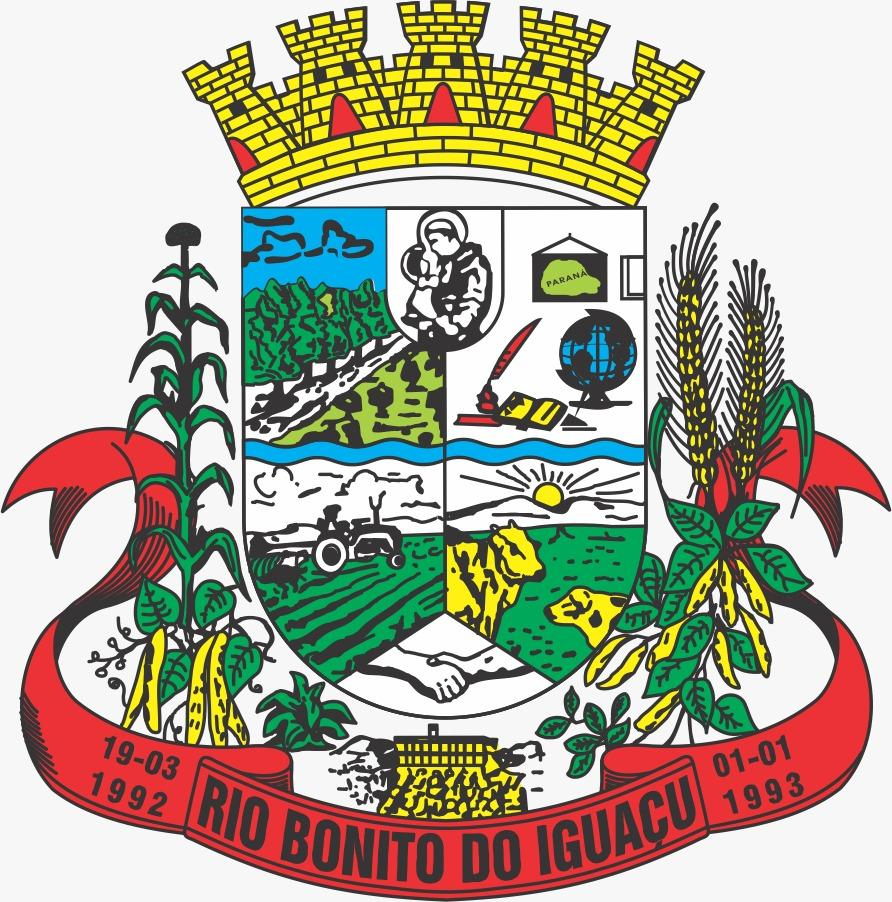
- Flag Coat of arms
- Interactive map of Rio Bonito do Iguaçu
- Country: Brazil
- Region: Southern
- State: Paraná
- Mesoregion: Centro-Sul Paranaense

Population (2020)
  - Total: 13,255
- Time zone: UTC−3 (BRT)

Rio Bonito do Iguaçu is a municipality in the state of Paraná in the Southern Region of Brazil.

== History ==
Rio Bonito means nice river and Iguaçu in Tupi means big water: y (water) and gûasu (big).

=== 2025 tornado ===
On November 7, 2025, an F4 tornado with winds exceeding 300 km/h impacted Rio Bonito do Iguaçu, leaving a trail of destruction, six confirmed deaths, and dozens injured. Previously rated as an F3, however, experts from PREVOTS, Simepar, and MetSul Meteorologia, rated the tornado as an F4 a few days later.

== See also ==
- List of municipalities in Paraná
