= Lajeado Grande =

Coordinates: 26.8581°S 52.5672°W

- Municipality
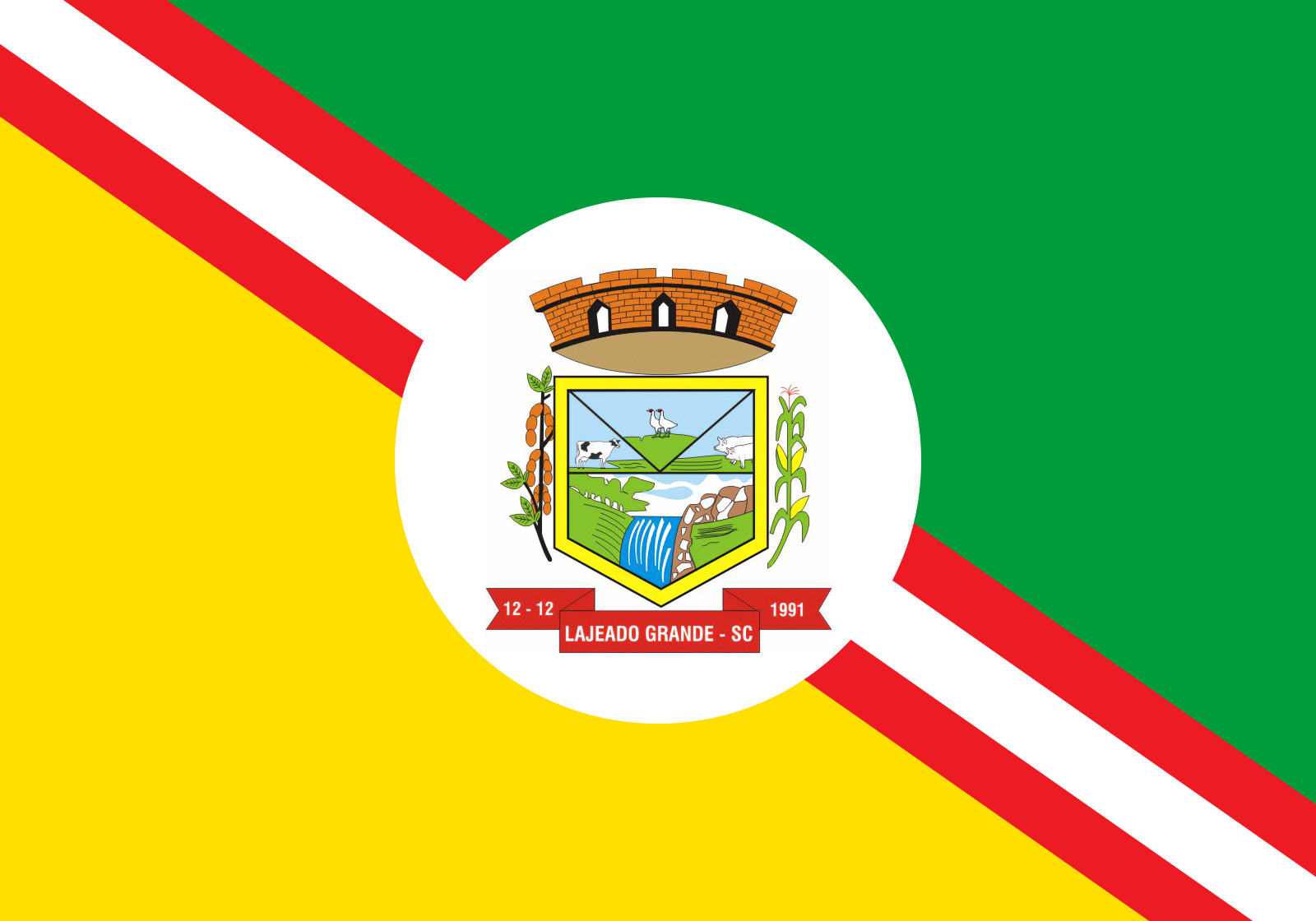
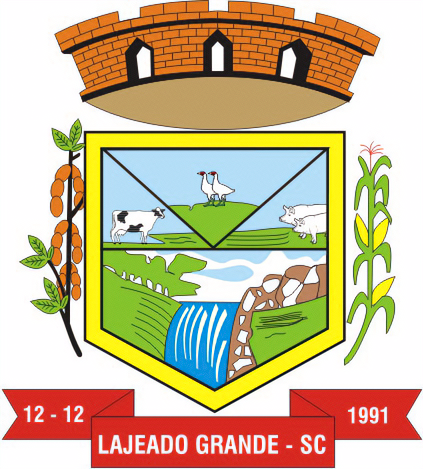
- Flag Coat of arms

- Country: Brazil
- Region: South
- State: Santa Catarina
- Mesoregion: Oeste Catarinense

Population (2020)
  - Total: 1,418
- Time zone: UTC -3
- Website: www.lajeadogrande.sc.gov.br

Lajeado Grande is a municipality in the state of Santa Catarina in the South region of Brazil.

== See also ==
- List of municipalities in Santa Catarina
