= Nova Laranjeiras =

Coordinates: 25°18′S 52°32′W

- Municipality
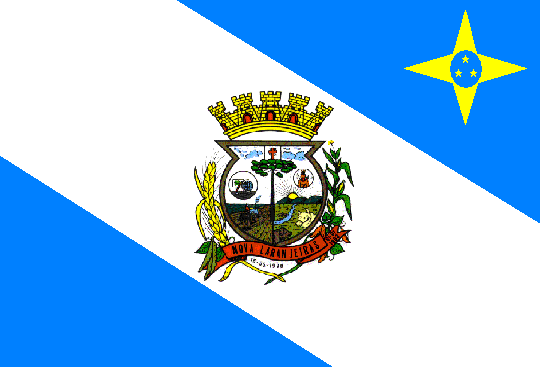
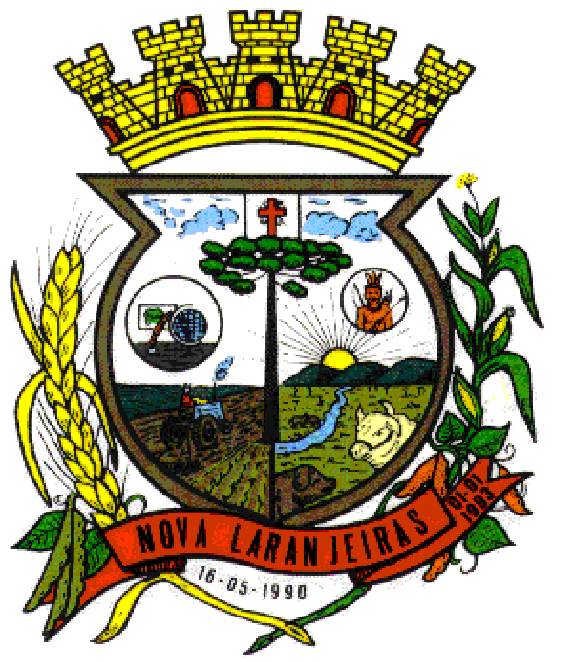
- Flag Coat of arms
- Interactive map of Nova Laranjeiras
- Country: Brazil
- Region: Southern
- State: Paraná
- Mesoregion: Centro-Sul Paranaense

Population (2020)
  - Total: 11,507
- Time zone: UTC−3 (BRT)

Nova Laranjeiras is a municipality in the state of Paraná in the Southern Region of Brazil.

== See also ==
- List of municipalities in Paraná
