= Mauá da Serra =

Coordinates: 23.9008°S 51.2289°W

- Municipality
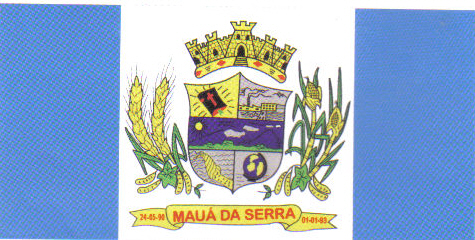
- Flag
- Interactive map of Mauá da Serra
- Country: Brazil
- Region: Southern
- State: Paraná
- Mesoregion: Noroeste Paranaense

Population (2020)
  - Total: 10,800
- Time zone: UTC−3 (BRT)

Mauá da Serra is a municipality in the state of Paraná in the Southern Region of Brazil.

== Climate ==
Climate data for Mauá da Serra, elevation 1,020 m (3,350 ft), (1979–1991)
Month	Jan	Feb	Mar	Apr	May	Jun	Jul	Aug	Sep	Oct	Nov	Dec	Year
Record high °C (°F)	31.8 (89.2)	31.4 (88.5)	30.4 (86.7)	29.0 (84.2)	27.4 (81.3)	24.5 (76.1)	26.4 (79.5)	29.4 (84.9)	33.4 (92.1)	31.7 (89.1)	35.0 (95.0)	32.6 (90.7)	35.0 (95.0)
Mean daily maximum °C (°F)	26.1 (79.0)	26.1 (79.0)	25.8 (78.4)	24.0 (75.2)	20.9 (69.6)	19.4 (66.9)	19.5 (67.1)	21.9 (71.4)	22.5 (72.5)	24.5 (76.1)	25.4 (77.7)	25.4 (77.7)	23.5 (74.2)
Daily mean °C (°F)	21.3 (70.3)	21.2 (70.2)	20.9 (69.6)	19.2 (66.6)	16.4 (61.5)	14.9 (58.8)	14.7 (58.5)	16.9 (62.4)	17.1 (62.8)	19.3 (66.7)	20.4 (68.7)	20.8 (69.4)	18.6 (65.5)
Mean daily minimum °C (°F)	17.6 (63.7)	17.9 (64.2)	17.4 (63.3)	15.9 (60.6)	13.4 (56.1)	11.8 (53.2)	11.4 (52.5)	13.3 (55.9)	13.1 (55.6)	15.0 (59.0)	16.3 (61.3)	17.2 (63.0)	15.0 (59.0)
Record low °C (°F)	8.4 (47.1)	10.8 (51.4)	6.7 (44.1)	8.8 (47.8)	−2.1 (28.2)	−1.2 (29.8)	−3.0 (26.6)	1.8 (35.2)	1.0 (33.8)	6.4 (43.5)	7.2 (45.0)	10.7 (51.3)	−3.0 (26.6)
Average precipitation mm (inches)	217.8 (8.57)	191.1 (7.52)	170.0 (6.69)	120.2 (4.73)	195.8 (7.71)	126.6 (4.98)	87.3 (3.44)	73.5 (2.89)	144.9 (5.70)	147.0 (5.79)	187.7 (7.39)	217.1 (8.55)	1,879 (73.96)
Average precipitation days (≥ 1.0 mm)	15	14	13	10	10	8	7	7	10	11	12	16	133
Average relative humidity (%)	78	79	76	77	76	74	70	65	66	68	70	76	73
Mean monthly sunshine hours	211.3	183.1	219.3	204.3	199.0	200.5	226.1	222.2	195.9	216.1	215.0	204.8	2,497.6
Source: IDR-Paraná

== See also ==
- List of municipalities in Paraná
