= Porto Barreiro =

Coordinates: 16°05′S 58°05′W

- Municipality
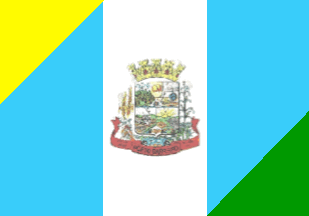
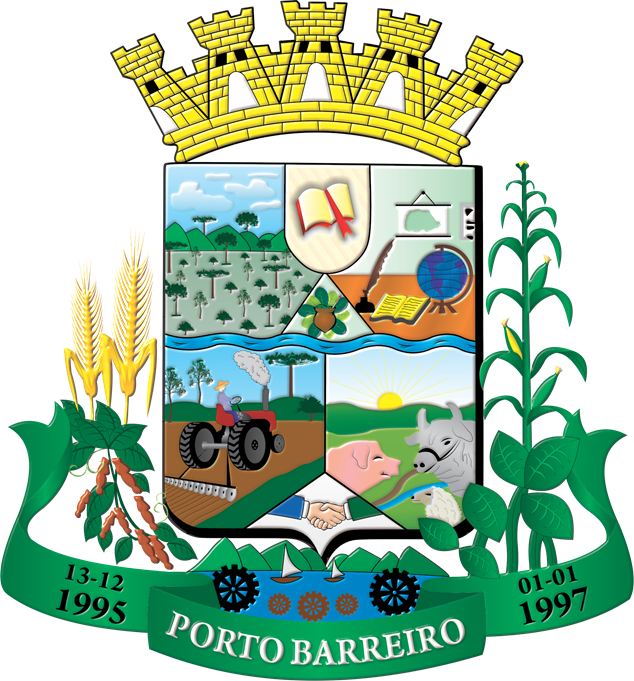
- Flag Coat of arms
- Interactive map of Porto Barreiro
- Country: Brazil
- Region: Southern
- State: Paraná
- Mesoregion: Centro-Sul Paranaense

Population (2020)
  - Total: 3,184
- Time zone: UTC−3 (BRT)

Porto Barreiro is a municipality in the state of Paraná in the Southern Region of Brazil.

== See also ==
- List of municipalities in Paraná
