= Dionísio Cerqueira =

- Municipality
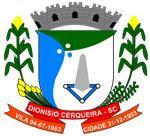
- Flag Coat of arms

- Location in Brazil
- Coordinates: 26°15′S 53°38′W
- Country: Brazil
- Region: South
- State: Santa Catarina
- Mesoregion: Oeste Catarinense

Population (2020)
  - Total: 15,545
- Time zone: UTC -3

Dionísio Cerqueira is a municipality in the state of Santa Catarina in the South region of Brazil.

== See also ==
- List of municipalities in Santa Catarina
