= Cantagalo, Paraná =

Coordinates: 25°22′26″S 52°07′33″W

Cantagalo
- Municipality
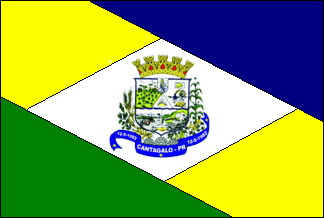
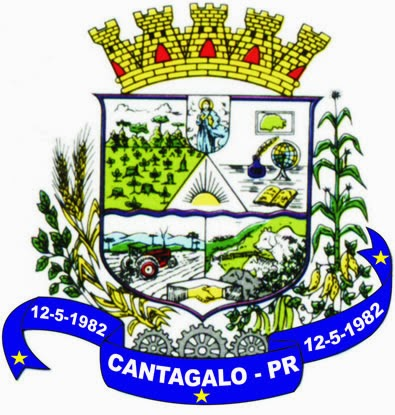
- Flag Coat of arms
- Interactive map of Cantagalo
- Country: Brazil
- Region: Southern
- State: Paraná
- Mesoregion: Centro-Sul Paranaense

Population (2020)
  - Total: 13,329
- Time zone: UTC−3 (BRT)

Cantagalo is a municipality in the state of Paraná in the Southern Region of Brazil.

== History ==
In early XX century, an entourage of Tropeiros led caravans of swine and cattle to Ponta Grossa, occasionally took rest in the region where now is Cantagalo. It is said that they were woken up by a rooster singing in the morning, which led to the name Cantagalo (eng. The Singing Rooster). With time, people started settling down and during the 1940's many families had moved into the new settlement.

== See also ==
- List of municipalities in Paraná
