= Espigão Alto do Iguaçu =

Coordinates: 25.4239°S 52.8358°W

- Municipality
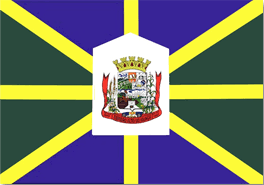
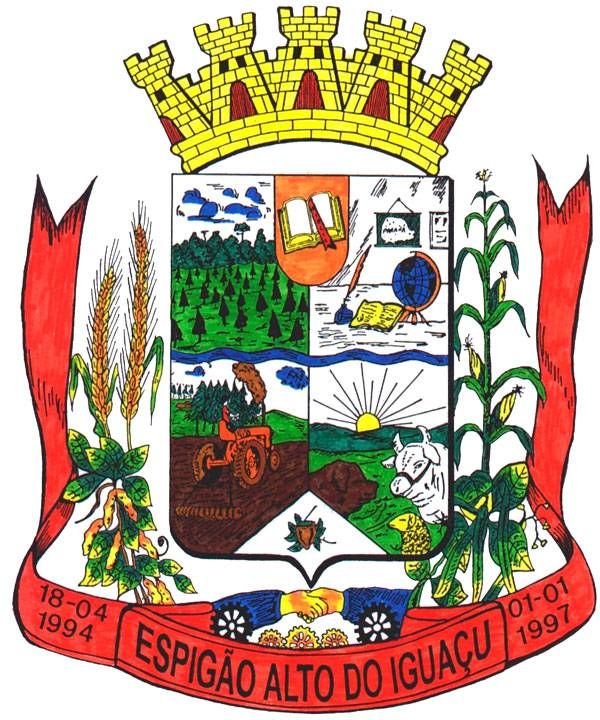
- Flag Coat of arms
- Interactive map of Espigão Alto do Iguaçu
- Country: Brazil
- Region: Southern
- State: Paraná
- Mesoregion: Centro-Sul Paranaense

Population (2020)
  - Total: 4,048
- Time zone: UTC−3 (BRT)

Espigão Alto do Iguaçu is a municipality in the state of Paraná in the Southern Region of Brazil.

== See also ==
- List of municipalities in Paraná
