= Virmond =

Municipality in southern Brazil

- Municipality
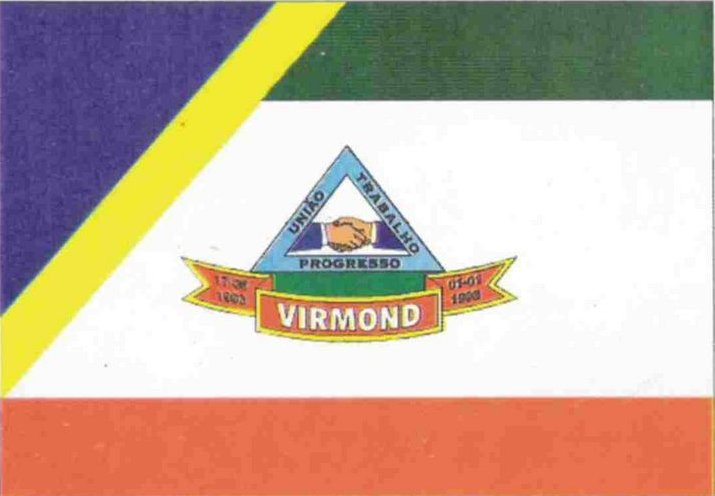
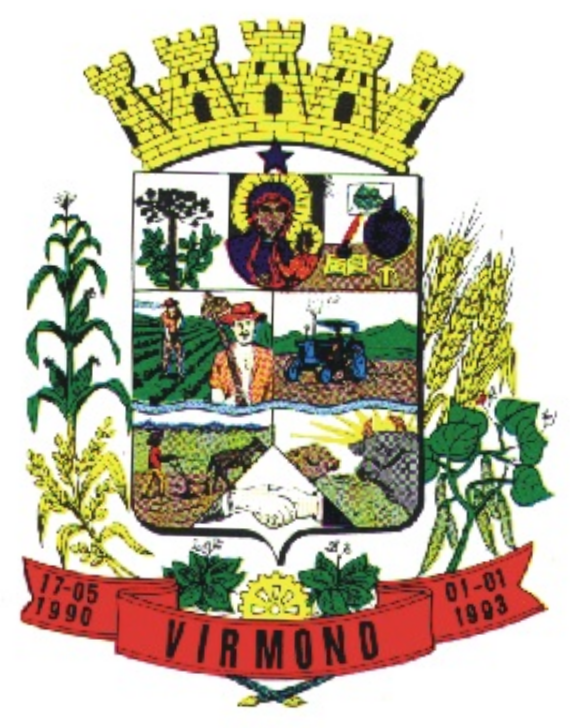
- Flag Coat of arms

- Location in the state of Paraná

- Location in Brazil
- Coordinates: 25°22′54″S 52°12′13″W
- Country: Brazil
- Region: Southern
- State: Paraná
- Mesoregion: Centro-Sul Paranaense

Area
  - Total: 93.891 sq mi (243.176 km^{2})

Population (2020)
  - Total: 4,022
  - Density: 42.1/sq mi (16.24/km^{2})
- Demonym: Virmondense
- Time zone: UTC−3 (BRT)

Virmond is a municipality in the state of Paraná in the Southern Region of Brazil.

== See also ==
- List of municipalities in Paraná
