= Marilândia do Sul =

Coordinates: 23°45′S 51°19′W

- Municipality
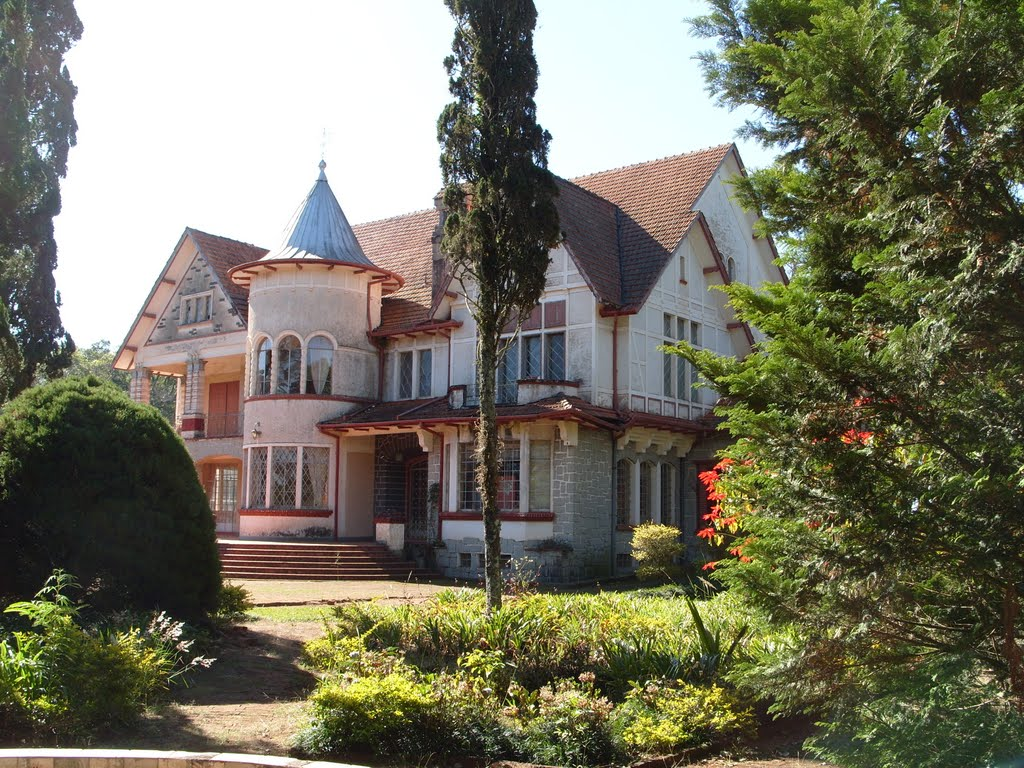
- Eldorado Castle seen from the conservatory, Marilândia do Sul.

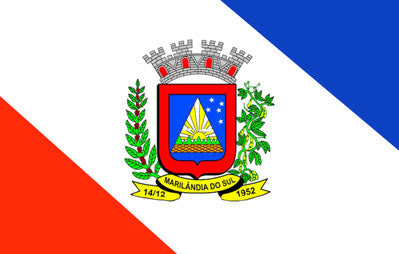
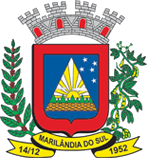
- Flag Coat of arms
- Interactive map of Marilândia do Sul
- Country: Brazil
- Region: Southern
- State: Paraná
- Mesoregion: Noroeste Paranaense

Population (2020)
  - Total: 8,814
- Time zone: UTC−3 (BRT)

Marilândia do Sul is a municipality in the state of Paraná in the Southern Region of Brazil.

== See also ==
- List of municipalities in Paraná
