= Campina do Simão =

Municipality in Paraná, Brazil

- Municipality
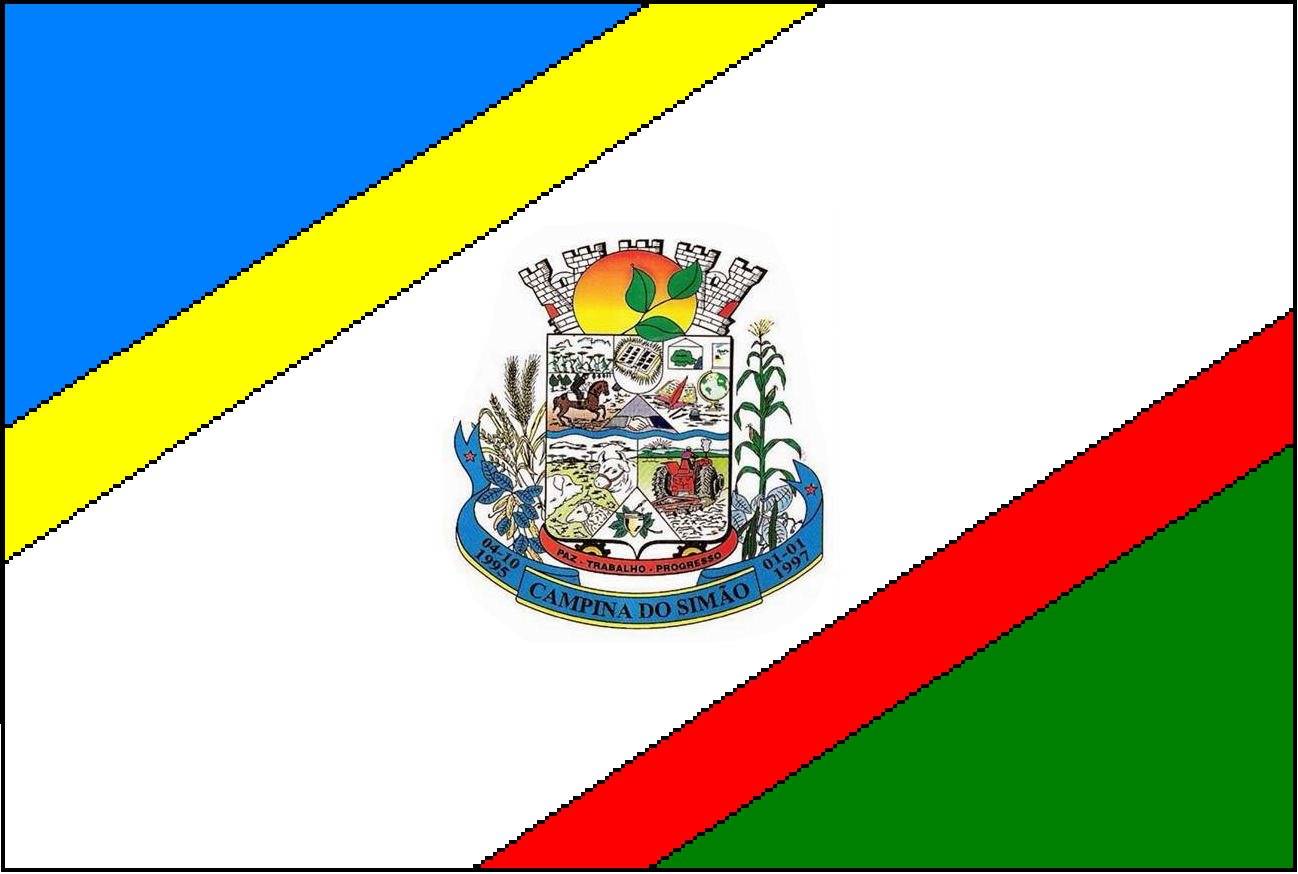
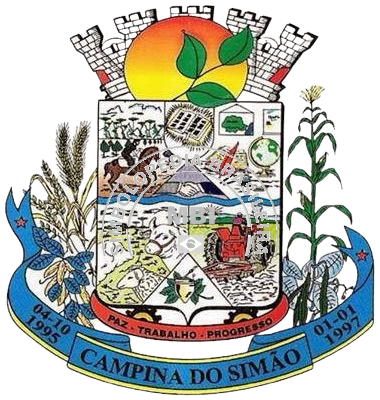
- Flag Coat of arms

- Location of Campina do Simão in Paraná

- Location of Campina do Simão in Brazil
- Coordinates: 25°4′44.04″S 51°49′36.84″W
- Country: Brazil
- Region: Southern
- State: Paraná
- Mesoregion: Centro-Sul Paranaense
- Incorporated: January 1, 1997

Government
  - Mayor: Laureci Miranda

Area
  - Total: 173.137 sq mi (448.424 km^{2})

Population (2020)
  - Total: 3,859
  - Density: 23.5/sq mi (9.09/km^{2})
- Time zone: UTC−3 (BRT)
- Website: campinadosimao.pr.gov.br

Campina do Simão is a municipality in the state of Paraná in the Southern Region of Brazil. The municipality was first settled at the beginning on the 20th century, and is named for its first resident, José Simão, also known as Jeca Simão. Campina do Simão was originally part of the municipality of Guarapuava; it became a separate district of Guarapuava in 1964, and an independent municipality on January 1, 1997.

Campina do Simão covers 448.424 square kilometres (173.137 mi^{2}), has a population of 3,859, and population density of 9.09 resident per square kilometer.

== See also ==
- List of municipalities in Paraná
