= PREVOTS =

Brazilian meterologist group

- Reporting Platform and Voluntary Network of Severe Storm Observers
- Plataforma de Registros e Rede Voluntária de Observadores de Tempestades Severas
- Formation: June 2018
- Official language: Portuguese Brazilian
- Website: https://prevots.org/

The Reporting Platform and Voluntary Network of Severe Storm Observers (Portuguese: Plataforma de Registros e Rede Voluntária de Observadores de Tempestades Severas), usually called PREVOTS, is a Brazilian group of meteorologists, which aims to improve documentation, research and forecasting of severe weather in Brazil. It began in June 2018 and is a combination of the Storm Observers Voluntary Network (REVOT) from the Federal University of Santa Maria and the Severe Weather Reporting Platform (PRETS). PREVOTS is also a partner in an international collaboration that reports severe weather events in South America, the SAMHI.

== Partners ==
Since its establishment, PREVOTS has, with the help of partners, worked in research and analysis of severe weather, including:

- Federal University of Santa Maria (UFSM)
- National Institute for Space Research (INPE)
- South American Meteorological Risks and Impacts Database (SAMHI)
- Minas Gerais Water Management Institute (IGAM)
- University of Oklahoma
