= Candói =

Coordinates: 25°43′S 52°11′W

- Municipality
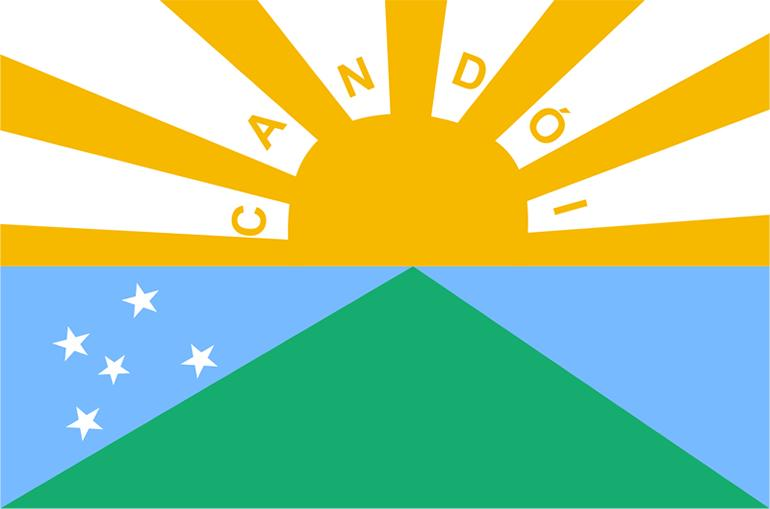
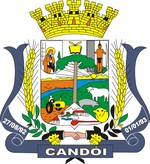
- Flag Coat of arms
- Interactive map of Candói
- Country: Brazil
- Region: Southern
- State: Paraná
- Mesoregion: Centro-Sul Paranaense

Area
  - Total: 584 sq mi (1,513 km^{2})

Population (2020)
  - Total: 16,053
- Time zone: UTC−3 (BRT)

Candói is a municipality in the state of Paraná in the Southern Region of Brazil.

== See also ==
- List of municipalities in Paraná
