= Quedas do Iguaçu =

Coordinates: 25.45°S 52.9078°W

- Municipality
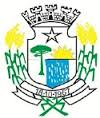
- Flag Coat of arms
- Interactive map of Quedas do Iguaçu
- Country: Brazil
- Region: Southern
- State: Paraná
- Mesoregion: Centro-Sul Paranaense

Population (2020)
  - Total: 34,409
- Time zone: UTC−3 (BRT)

Quedas do Iguaçu is a municipality in the state of Paraná in the Southern Region of Brazil.

== Climate ==
Climate data for Quedas do Iguaçu, elevation 513 m (1,683 ft), (1976–2005)
Month	Jan	Feb	Mar	Apr	May	Jun	Jul	Aug	Sep	Oct	Nov	Dec	Year
Record high °C (°F)	35.2 (95.4)	35.2 (95.4)	34.5 (94.1)	32.3 (90.1)	30.3 (86.5)	28.2 (82.8)	29.1 (84.4)	30.9 (87.6)	32.0 (89.6)	33.2 (91.8)	34.5 (94.1)	35.5 (95.9)	35.5 (95.9)
Mean daily maximum °C (°F)	30.8 (87.4)	30.2 (86.4)	29.7 (85.5)	27.1 (80.8)	24.0 (75.2)	21.6 (70.9)	22.4 (72.3)	23.9 (75.0)	28.1 (82.6)	27.2 (81.0)	28.8 (83.8)	30.1 (86.2)	27.0 (80.6)
Daily mean °C (°F)	24.3 (75.7)	23.8 (74.8)	23.0 (73.4)	20.6 (69.1)	17.6 (63.7)	15.4 (59.7)	15.6 (60.1)	16.9 (62.4)	19.0 (66.2)	20.6 (69.1)	22.2 (72.0)	23.6 (74.5)	20.2 (68.4)
Mean daily minimum °C (°F)	19.6 (67.3)	19.5 (67.1)	18.6 (65.5)	16.1 (61.0)	13.3 (55.9)	11.1 (52.0)	11.0 (51.8)	12.0 (53.6)	13.5 (56.3)	15.7 (60.3)	17.2 (63.0)	18.8 (65.8)	15.5 (60.0)
Record low °C (°F)	16.1 (61.0)	16.0 (60.8)	13.8 (56.8)	9.0 (48.2)	5.7 (42.3)	2.5 (36.5)	2.4 (36.3)	3.4 (38.1)	6.0 (42.8)	9.8 (49.6)	12.0 (53.6)	14.6 (58.3)	2.4 (36.3)
Average precipitation mm (inches)	213.1 (8.39)	195.3 (7.69)	133.1 (5.24)	160.3 (6.31)	174.9 (6.89)	146.9 (5.78)	122.2 (4.81)	108.5 (4.27)	165.4 (6.51)	219.5 (8.64)	169.3 (6.67)	179.2 (7.06)	1,987.7 (78.26)
Average relative humidity (%)	74	78	77	78	78	79	75	70	70	71	71	72	74
Source: Empresa Brasileira de Pesquisa Agropecuária (EMBRAPA)

== See also ==
- List of municipalities in Paraná
