= List of F4, EF4, and IF4 tornadoes (2020–present) =

Cell phone video of a deadly EF4 tornado near Somerset, Kentucky on May 16, 2025

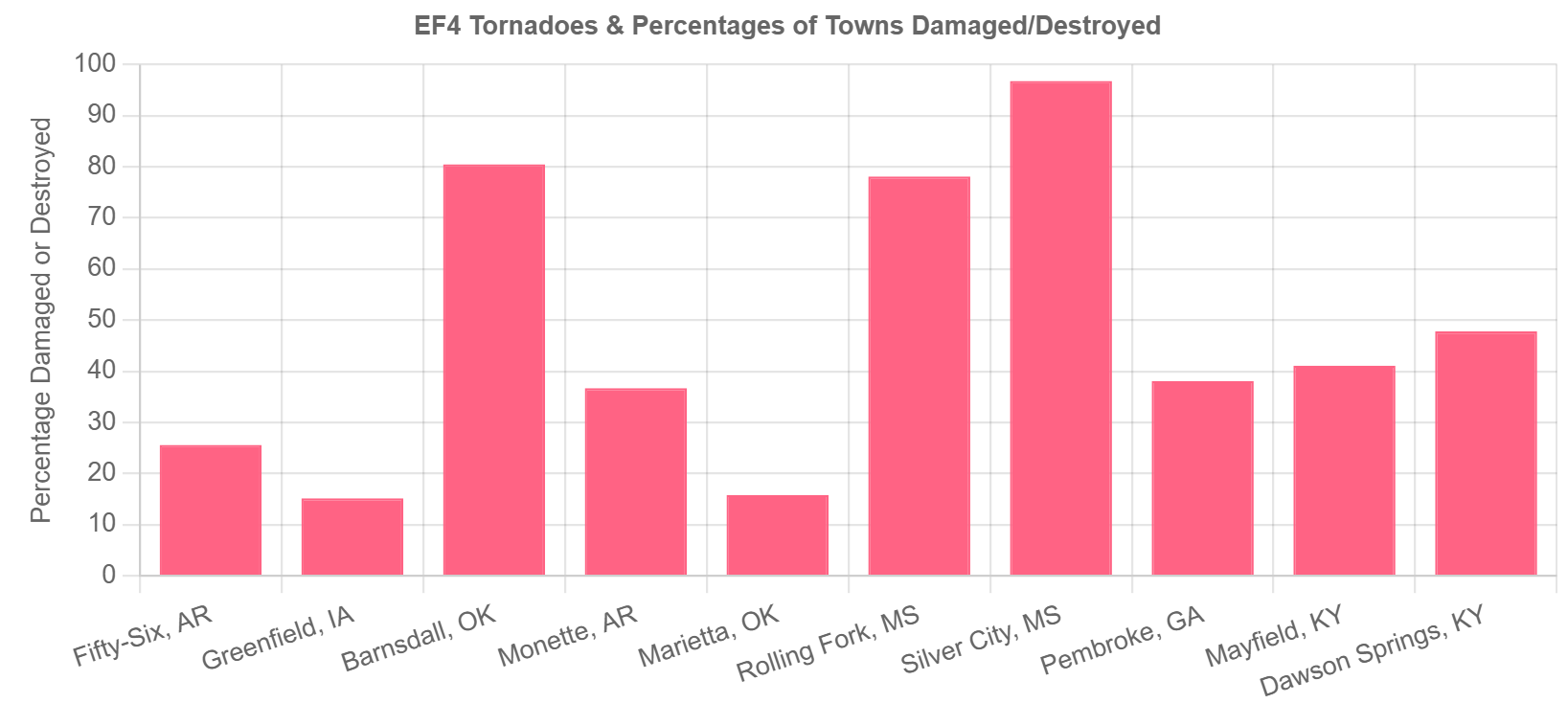
A chart showing various EF4 tornadoes during the 2020s and percentages of towns they damaged or destroyed

This is a list of tornadoes which have been officially or unofficially labeled as F4, EF4, IF4, or an equivalent rating during the 2020s decade. These scales – the Fujita scale, the Enhanced Fujita scale, the International Fujita scale, and the TORRO tornado intensity scale – attempt to estimate the intensity of a tornado by classifying the damage caused to natural features and man-made structures in the tornado's path.

Tornadoes are among the most violent known meteorological phenomena. Each year, more than 2,000 tornadoes are recorded worldwide, with the vast majority occurring in North America and Europe. To assess the intensity of these events, meteorologist Ted Fujita devised a method to estimate maximum wind speeds within tornadic storms based on the damage caused; this became known as the Fujita scale. The scale ranks tornadoes from F0 to F5, with F0 being the least intense and F5 being the most intense. F4 tornadoes were estimated to have had maximum winds between 207 mph (333 km/h) and 260 mph (420 km/h) and are considered violent tornadoes, along with F5 tornadoes. (Note: The winds estimated by the Fujita Scale are estimated values and have not been verified scientifically.)

Following two particularly devastating tornadoes in 1997 and 1999, engineers questioned the reliability of the Fujita scale. Ultimately, a new scale was devised that took into account 28 different damage indicators; this became known as the Enhanced Fujita scale. With building design and structural integrity taken more into account, winds in an EF4 tornado were estimated to between 166 mph (267 km/h) and 200 mph (320 km/h). The Enhanced Fujita scale is used predominantly in North America. Most of Europe, on the other hand, uses the TORRO tornado intensity scale (or T-Scale), which ranks tornado intensity between T0 and T11; F4/EF4 tornadoes are approximately equivalent to T8 to T9 on the T-Scale. Tornadoes rated IF4 on the International Fujita scale are also included on this list. Violent tornadoes, those rated F4/EF4 and F5/EF5 are rare and only make up 2% of all recorded tornadoes.

== List ==
Worldwide during the 2020s, 32 tornadoes have been rated F4/EF4/IF4. Twenty-five of these tornadoes occurred in the United States, receiving EF4 ratings, one occurred in Canada, four were rated F4 in Brazil, and one was rated IF4 in Syria/Turkey, and one occurred in the Czech Republic. These tornadoes have caused 171 fatalities and over 2,614 injuries. The most recent F4/EF4/IF4 tornado occurred on August 8, 2026, in Piraí do Sul, Brazil.

Images of F4/EF4/IF4 damage from 2020–2026

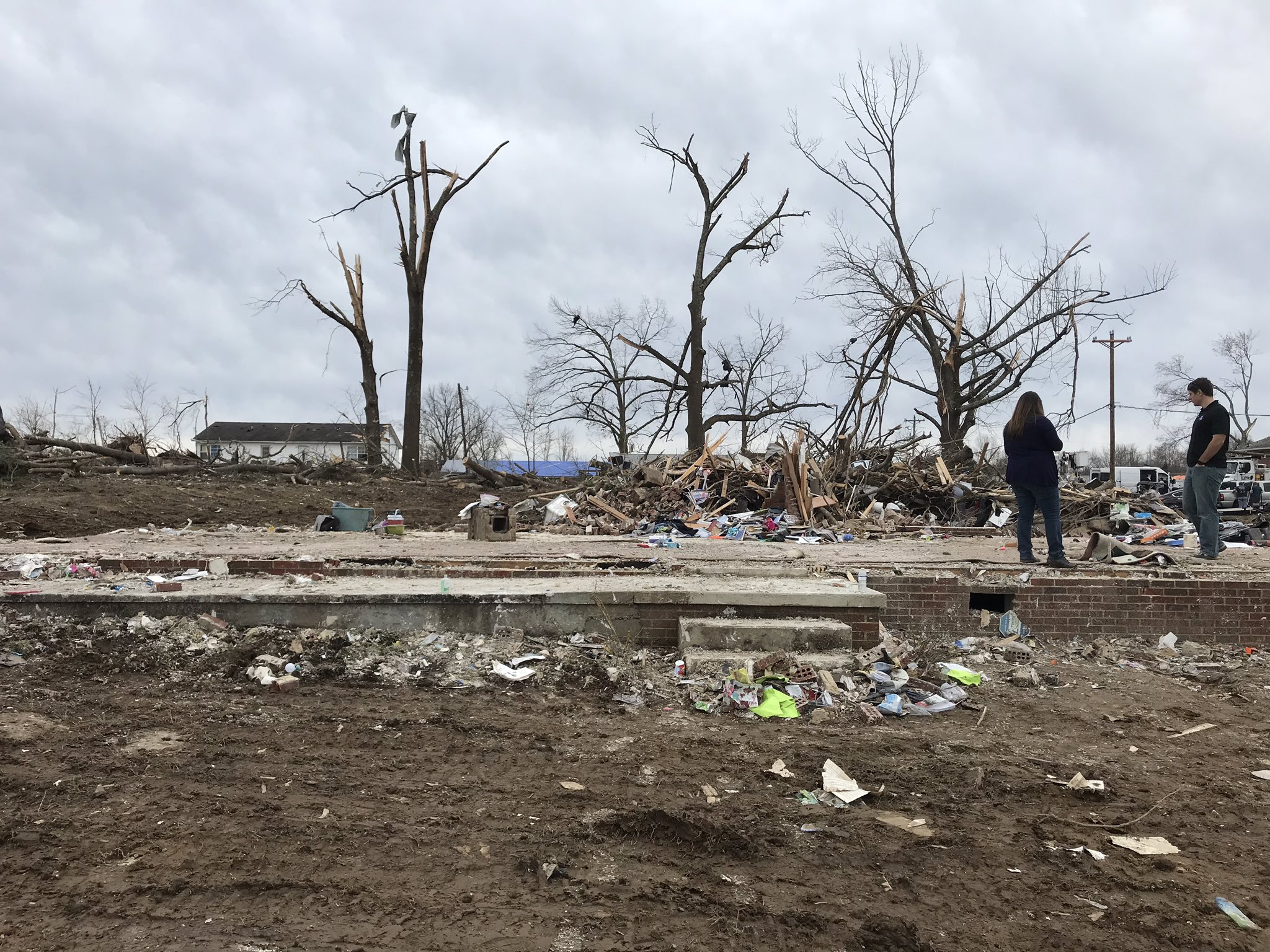
Cookeville, TN

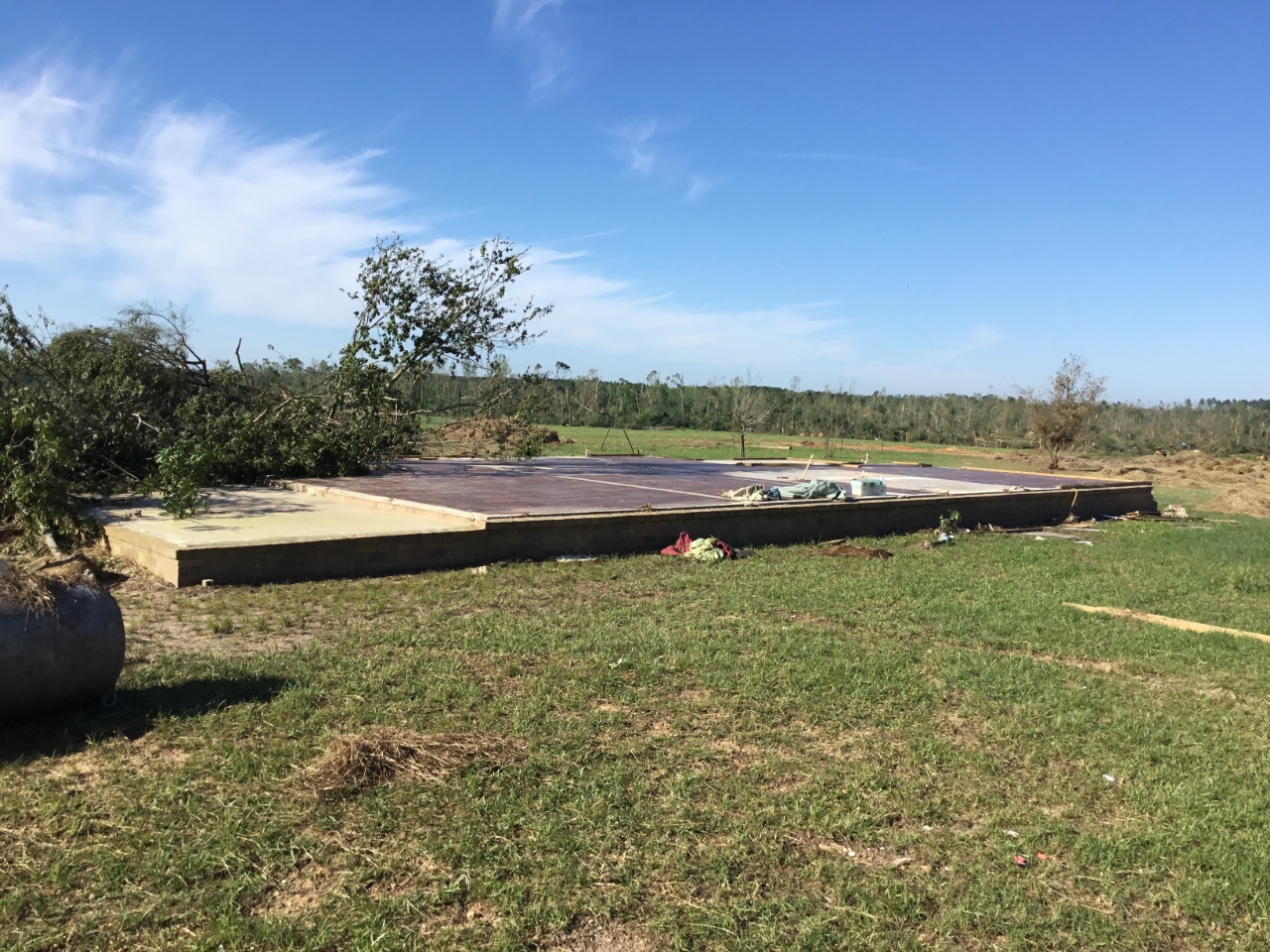
Sartinville, MS

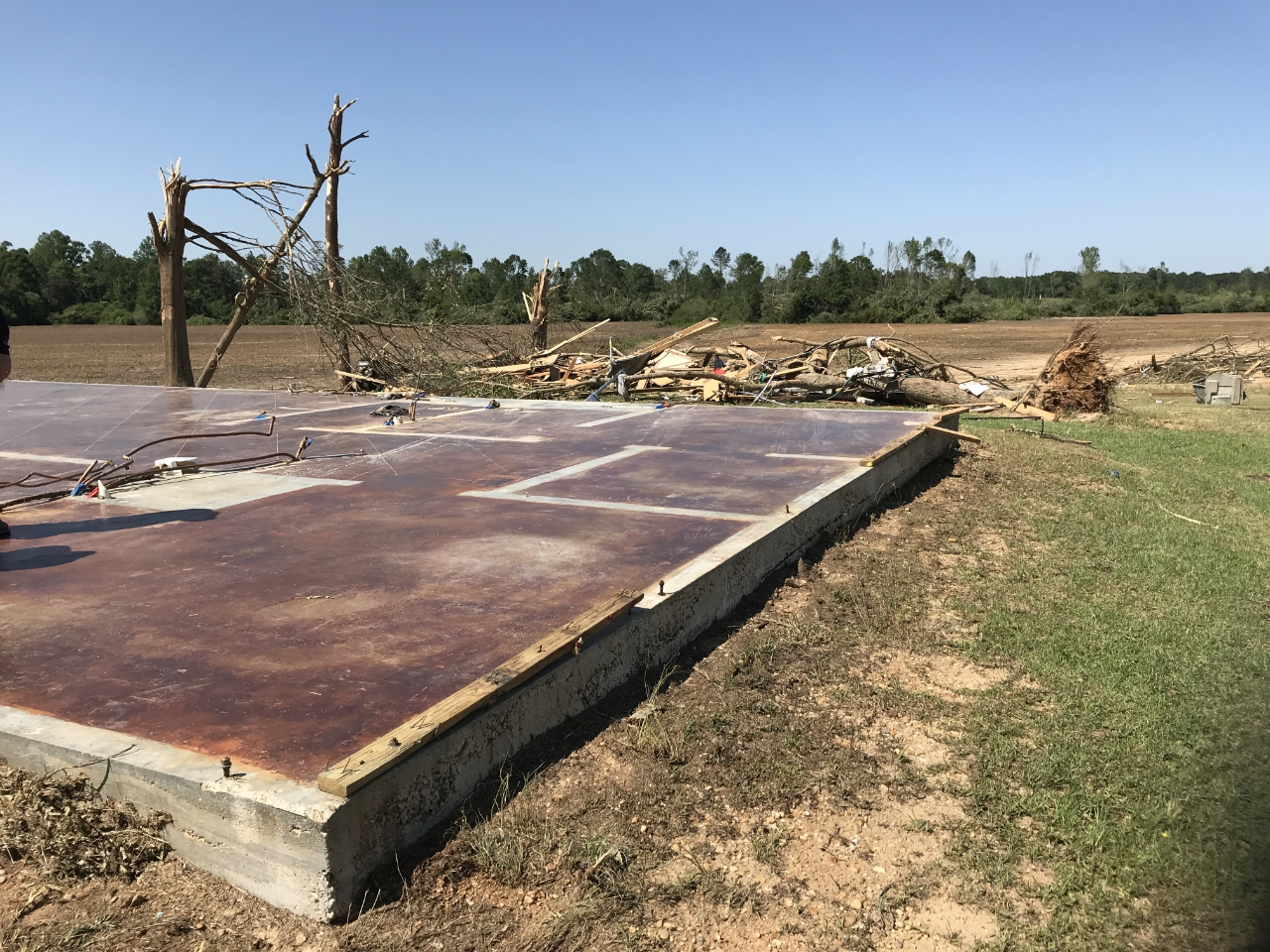
Cantwell Mill, MS

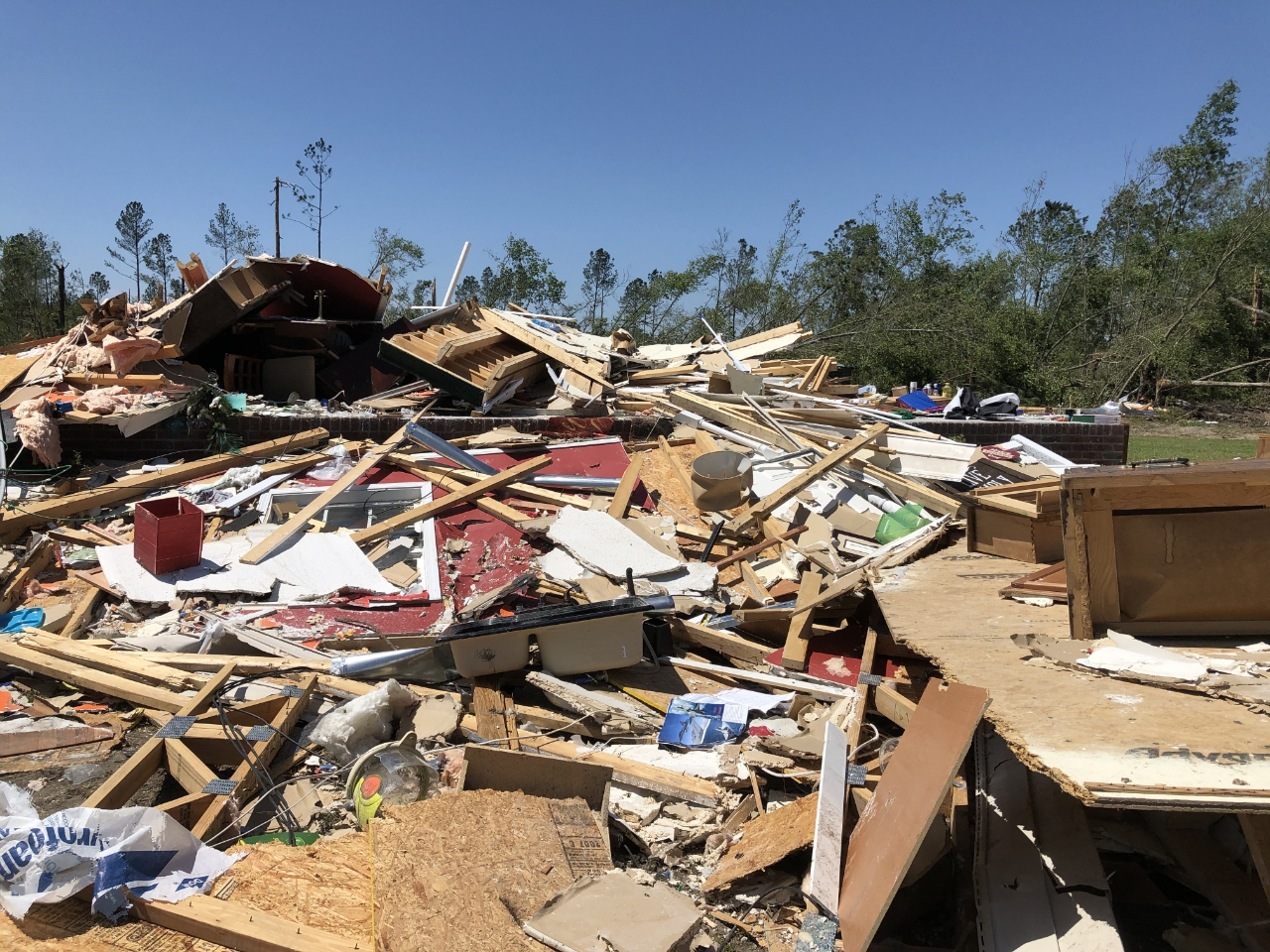
Nixville, SC

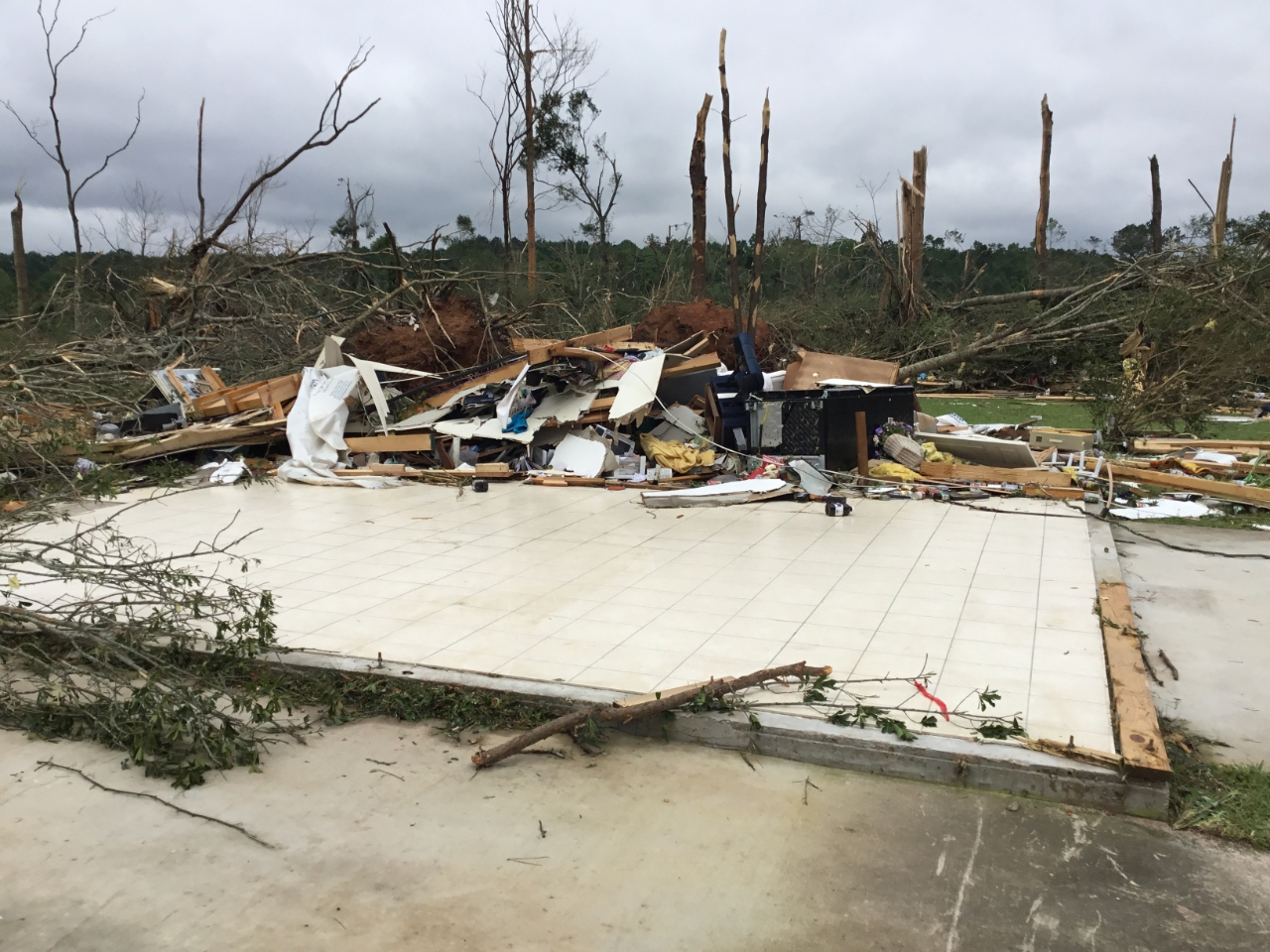
Sandy Hook, MS

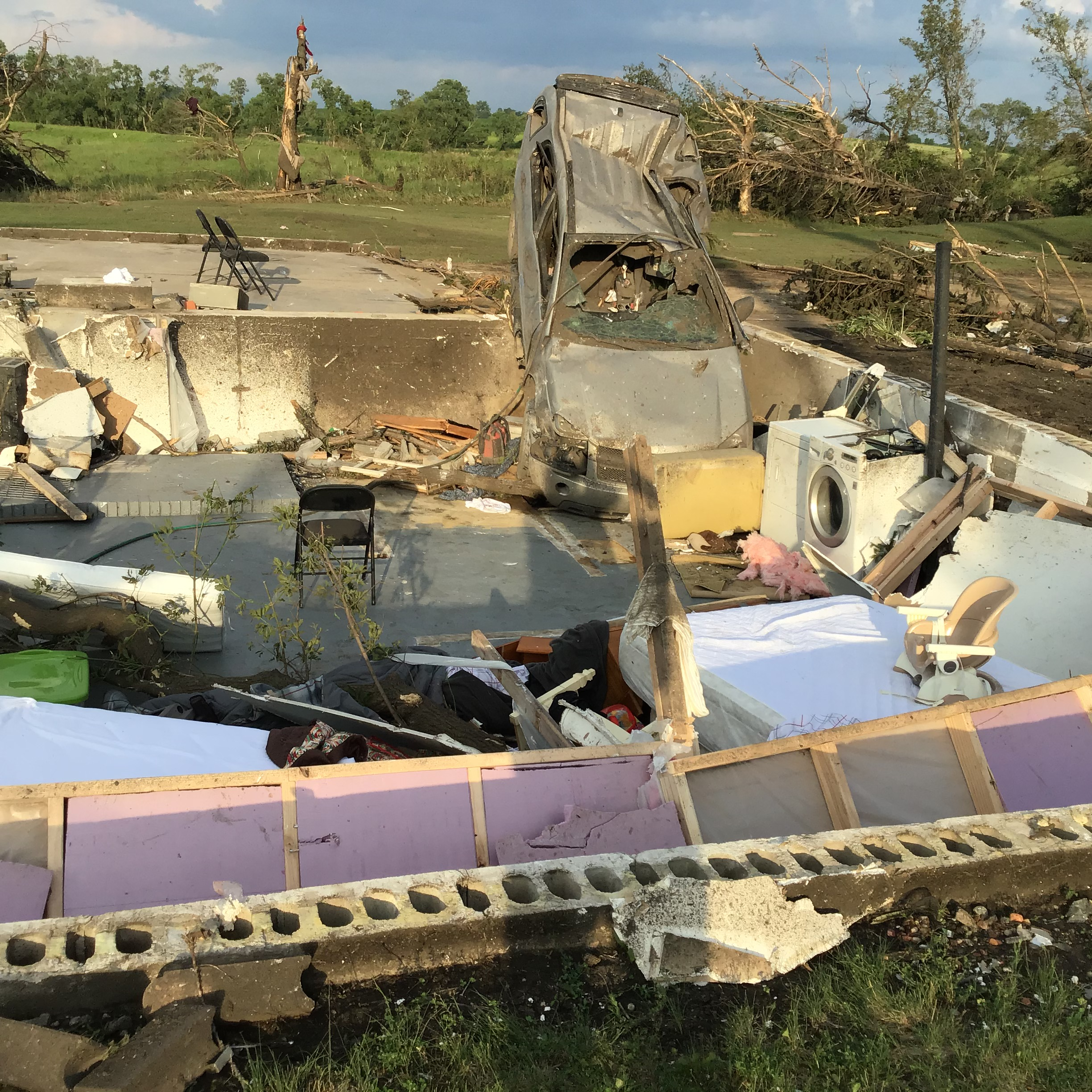
Ashby, MN

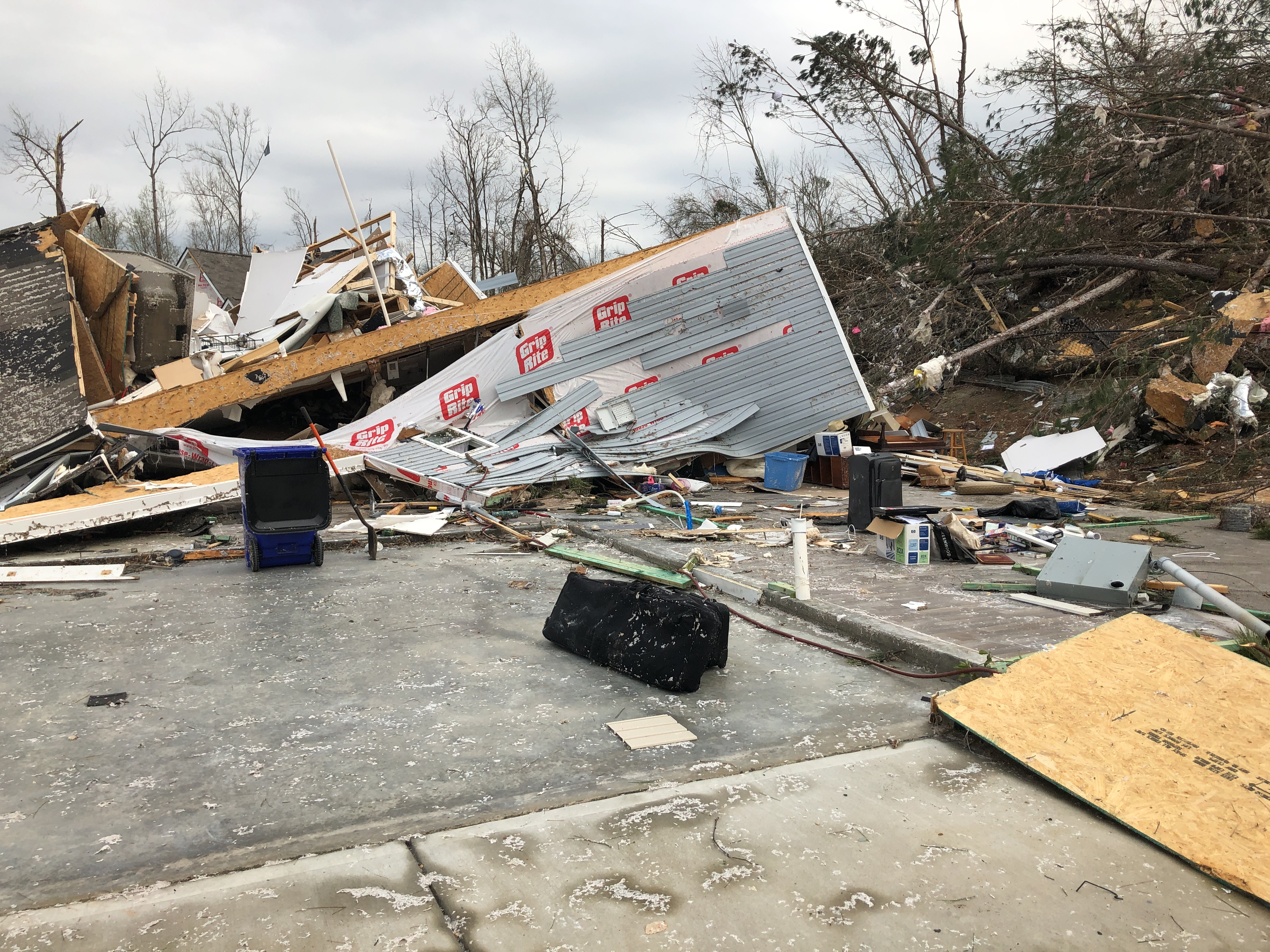
Newnan, GA

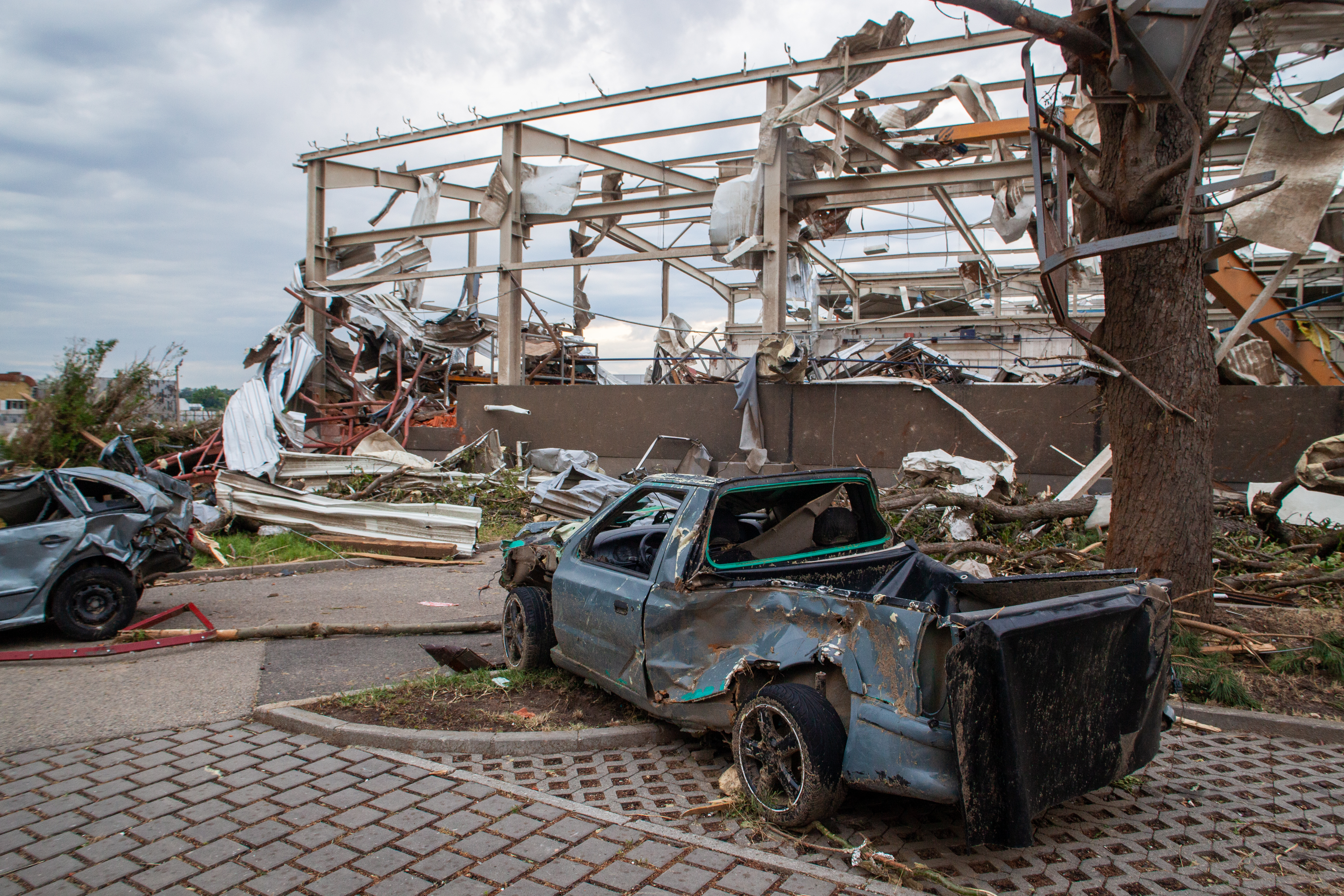
Lužice, CZ

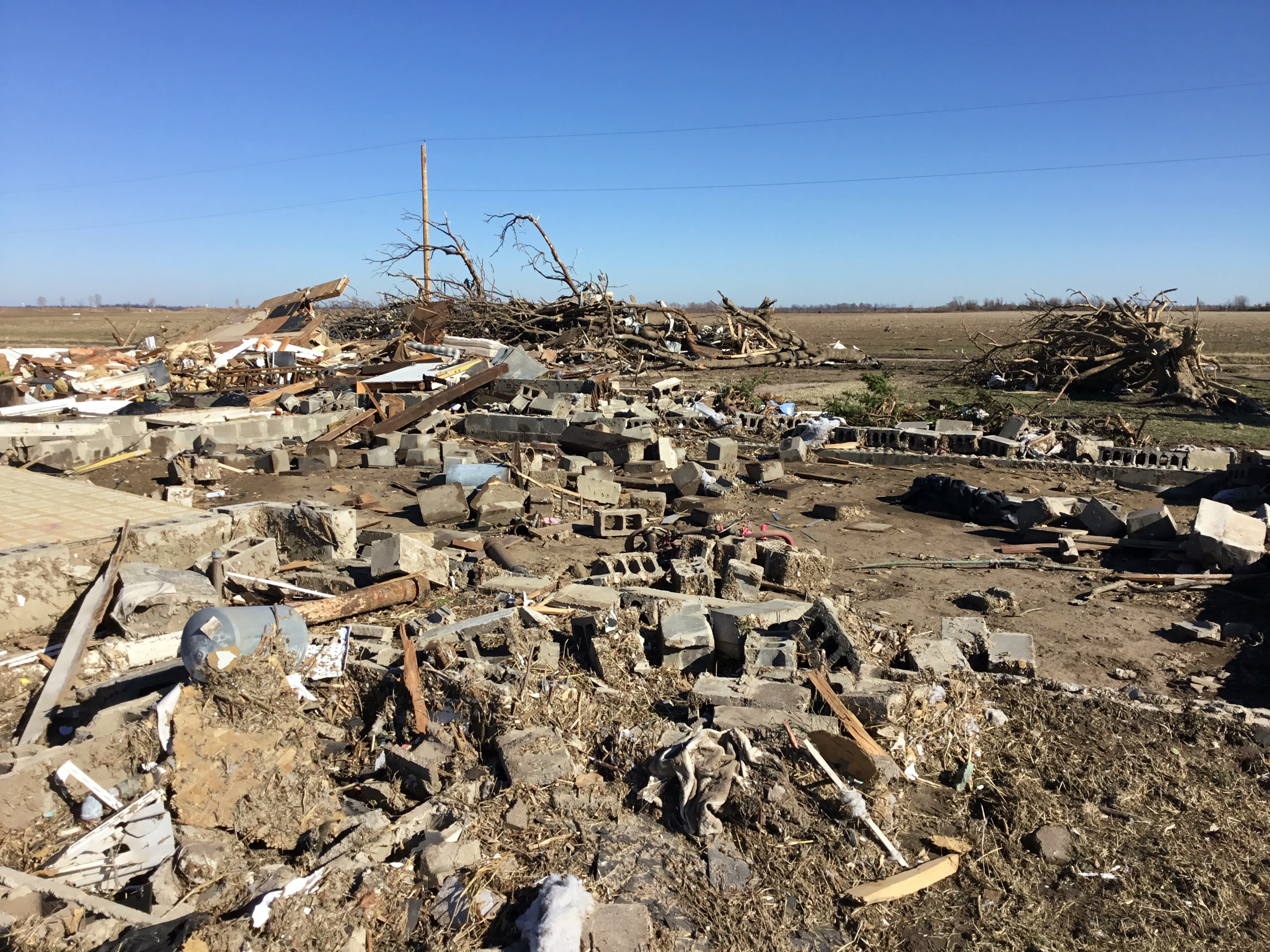
Braggadocio, MO

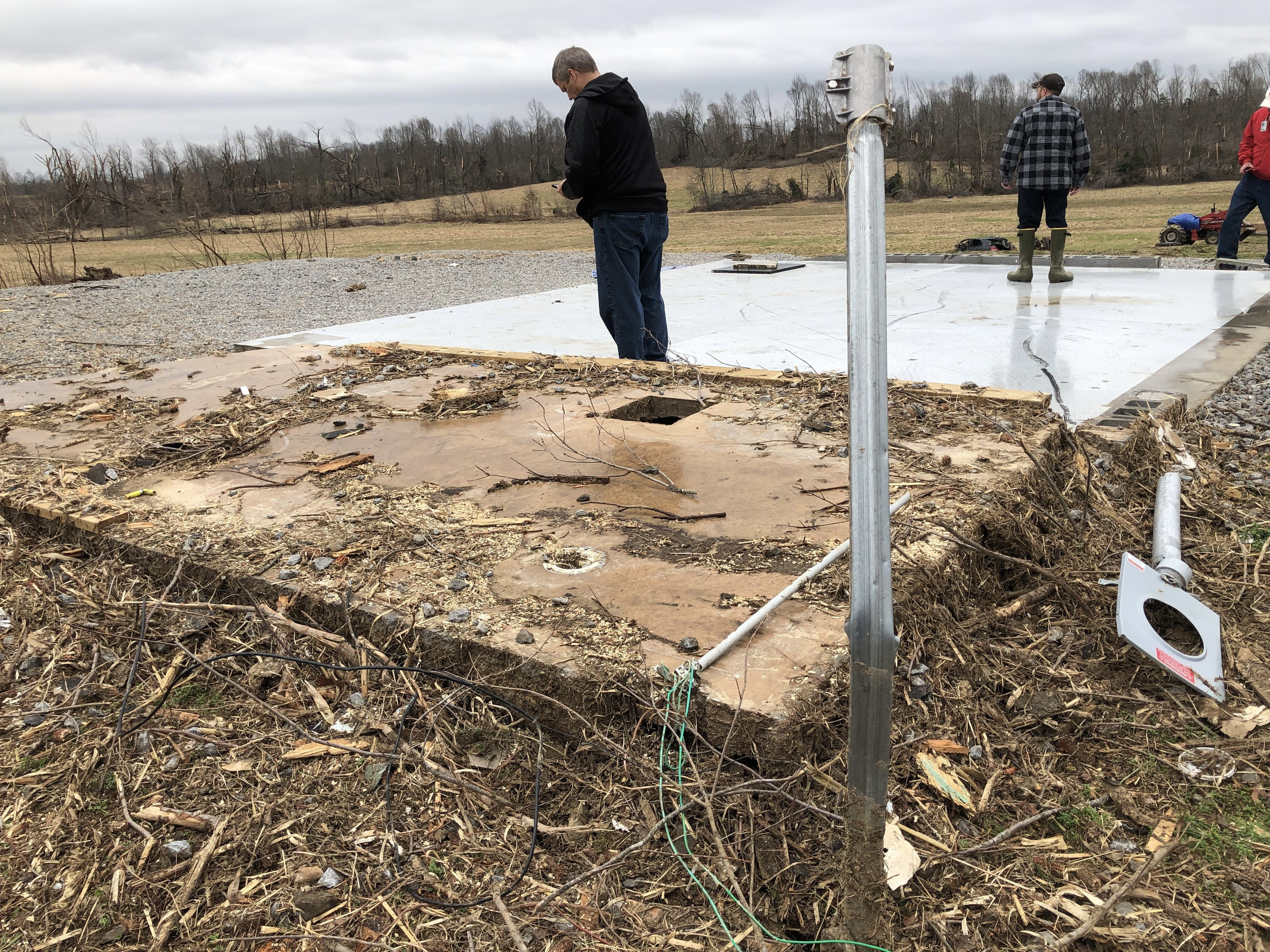
Bremen, KY

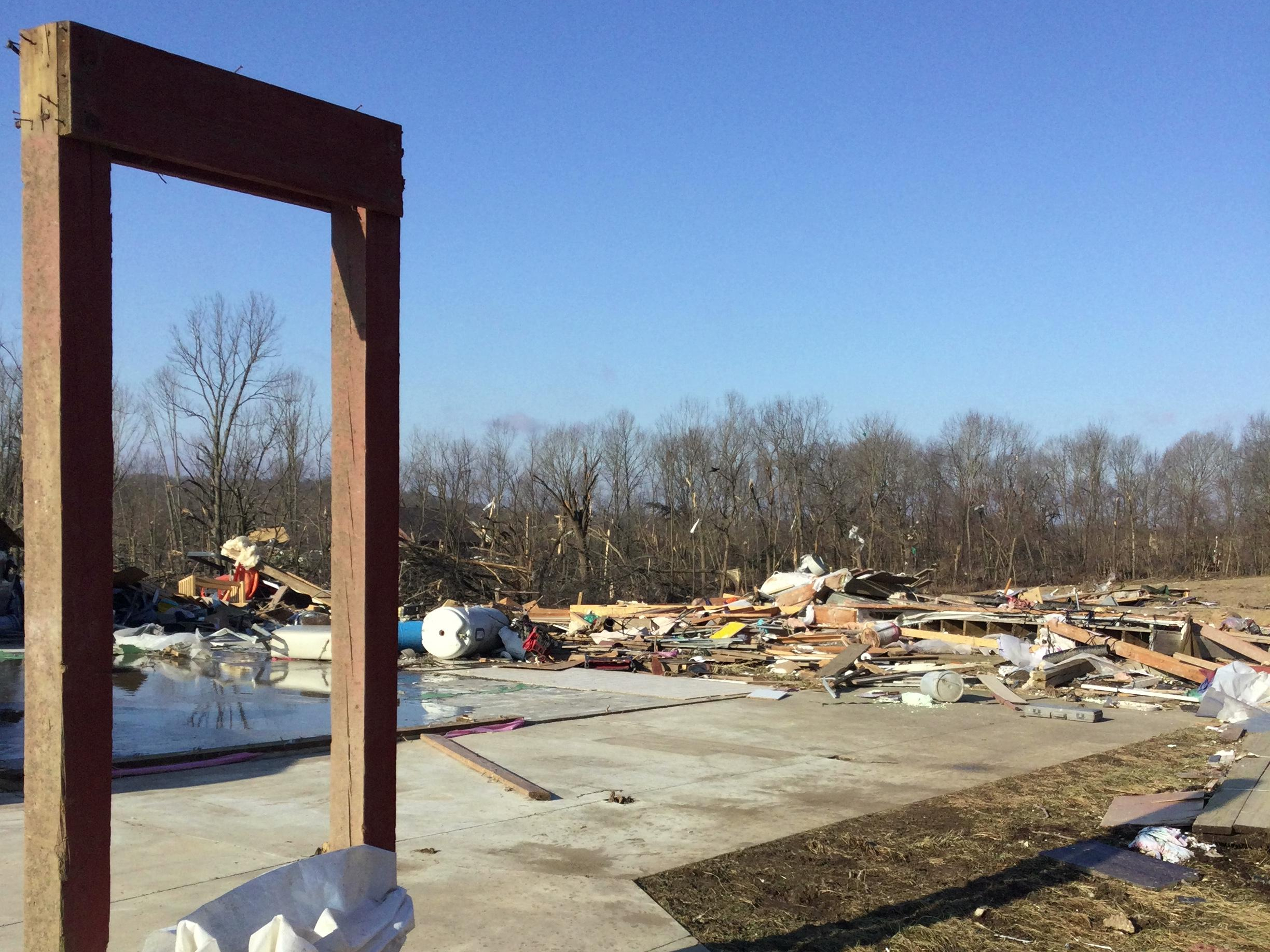
Winterset, IA

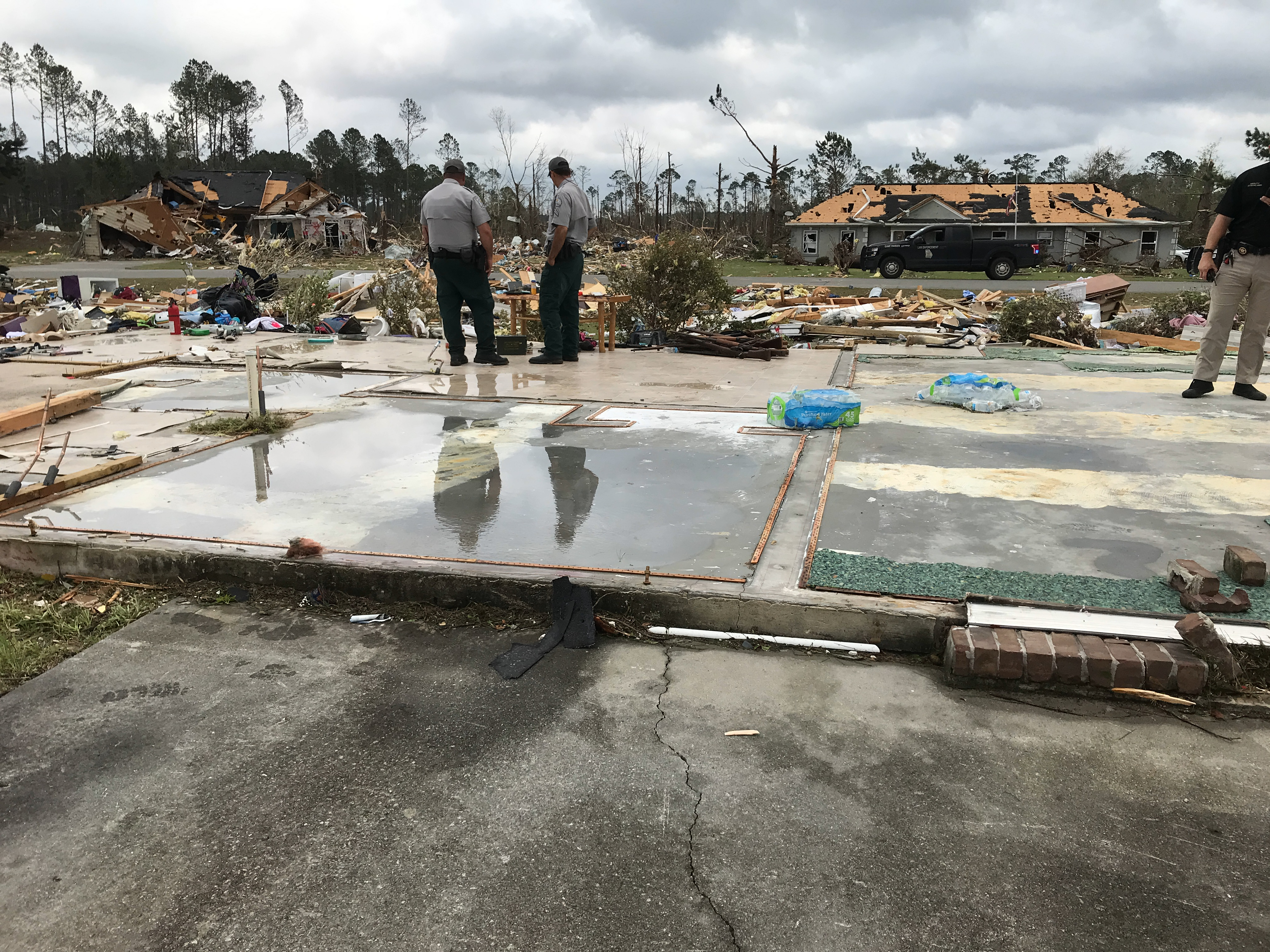
Pembroke, GA

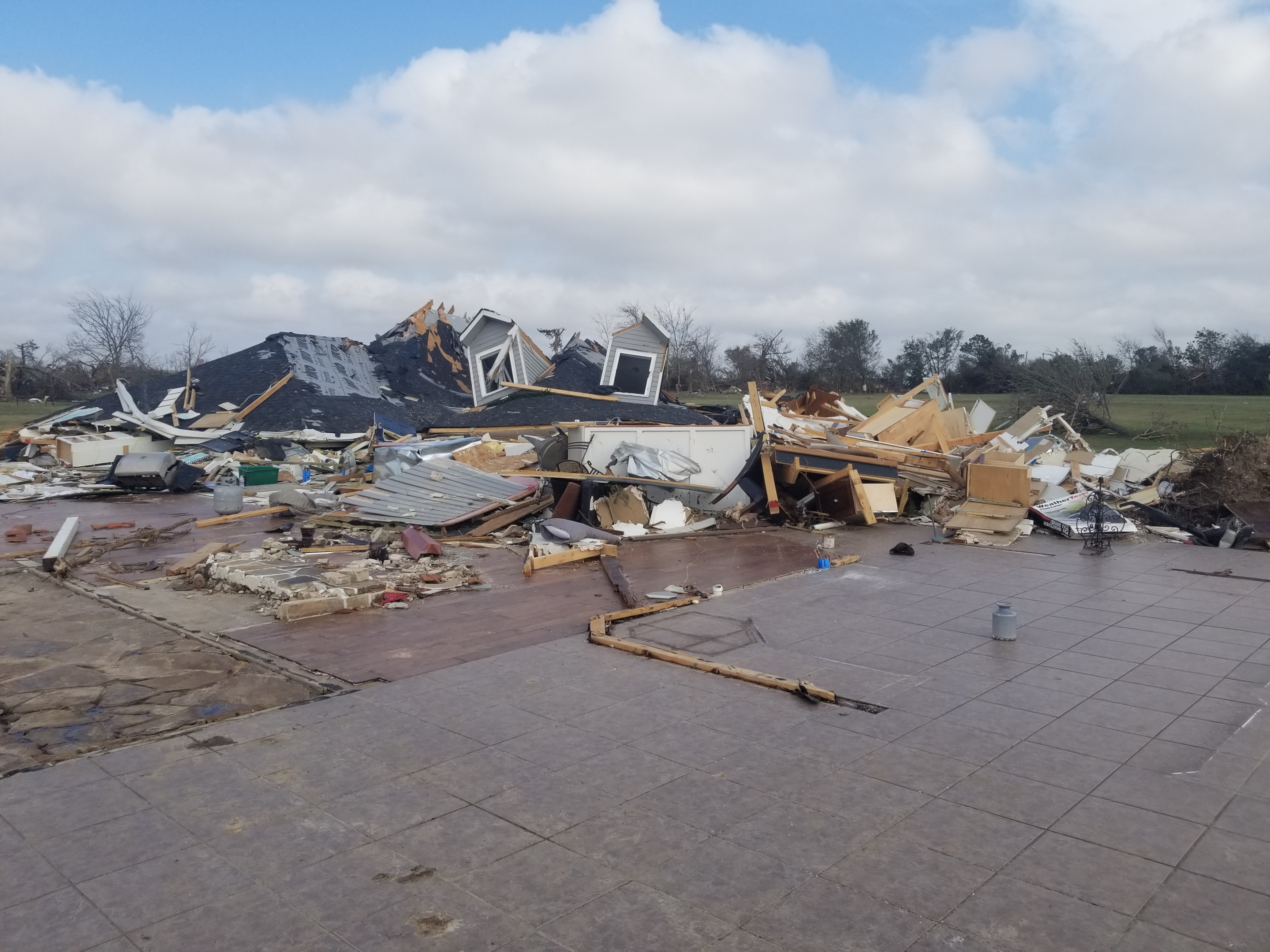
Caviness, TX

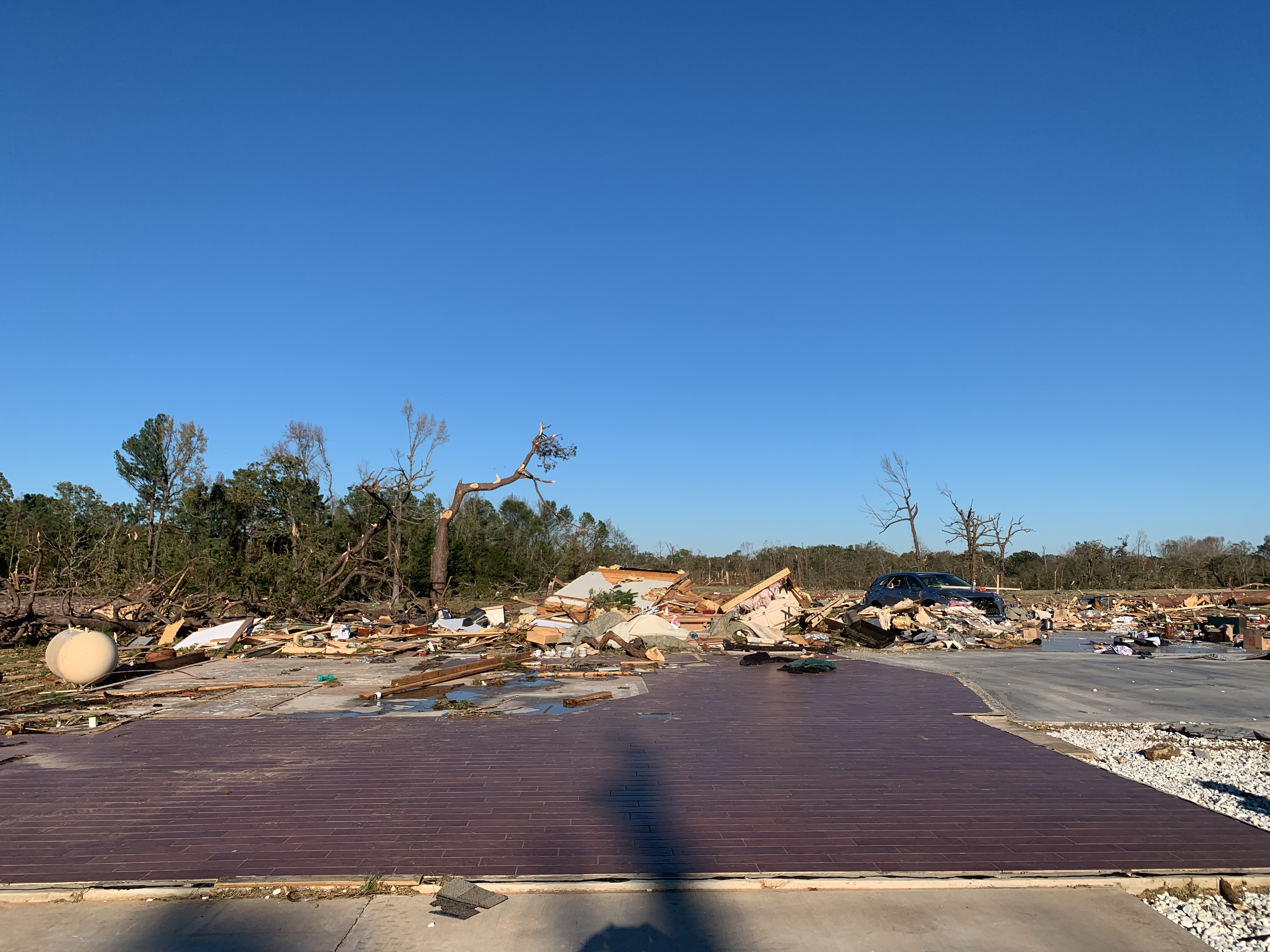
Clarksville, TX

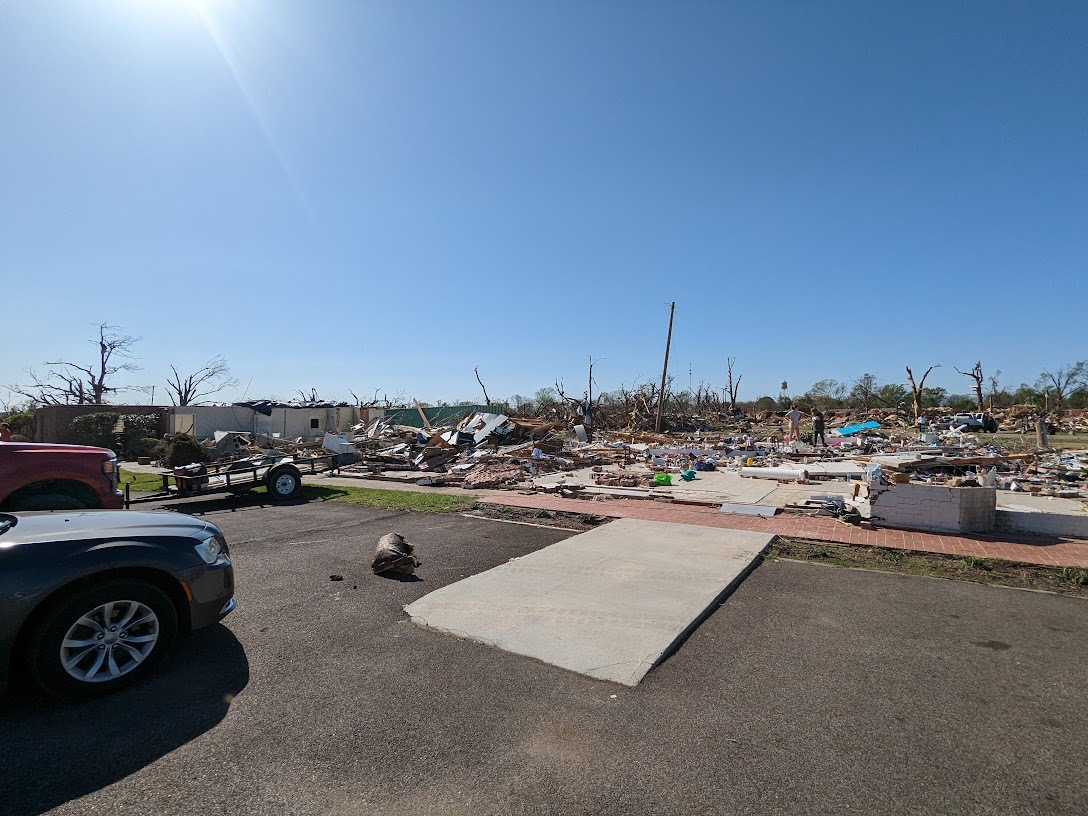
Rolling Fork, MS

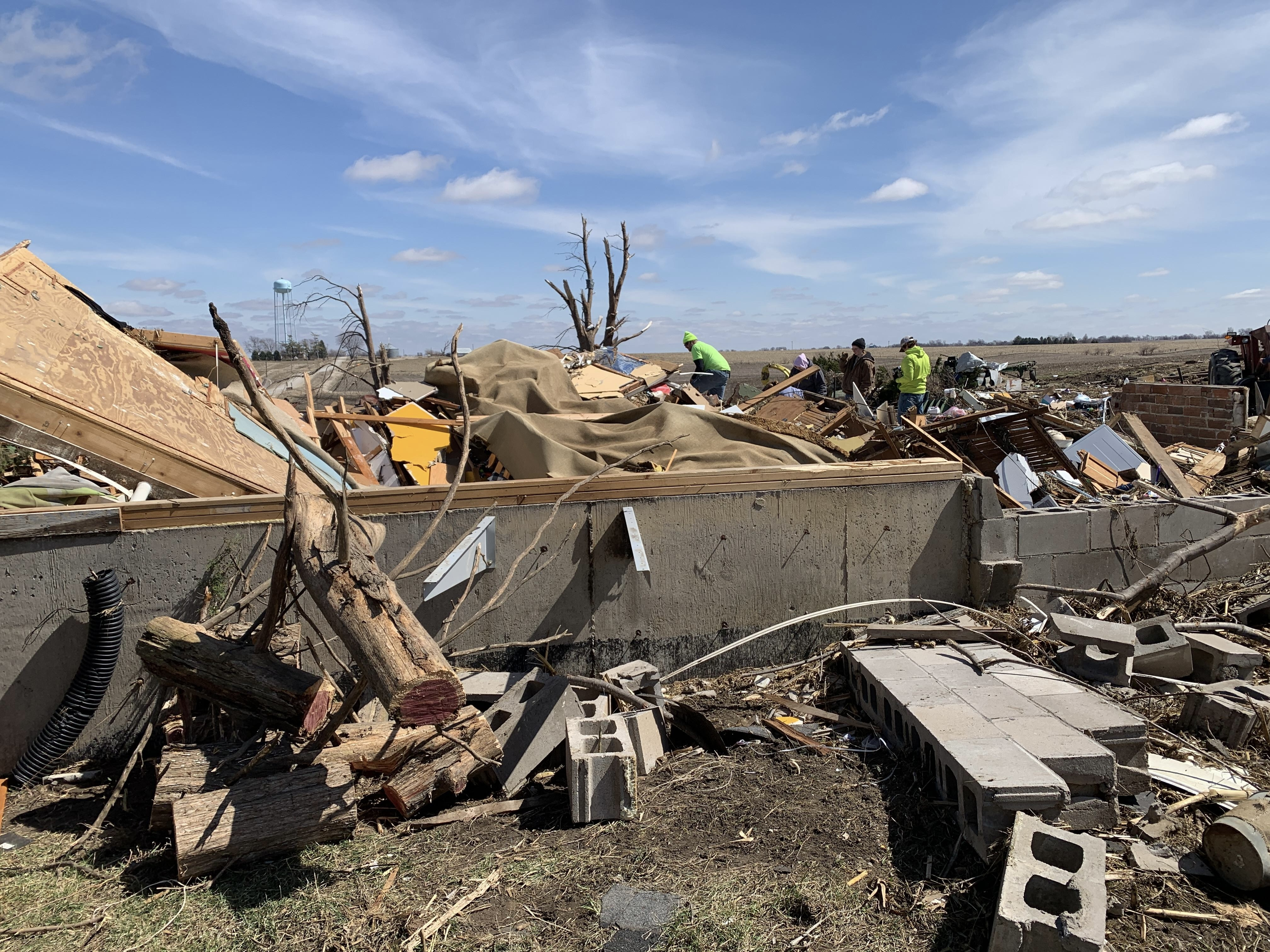
Keota, IA

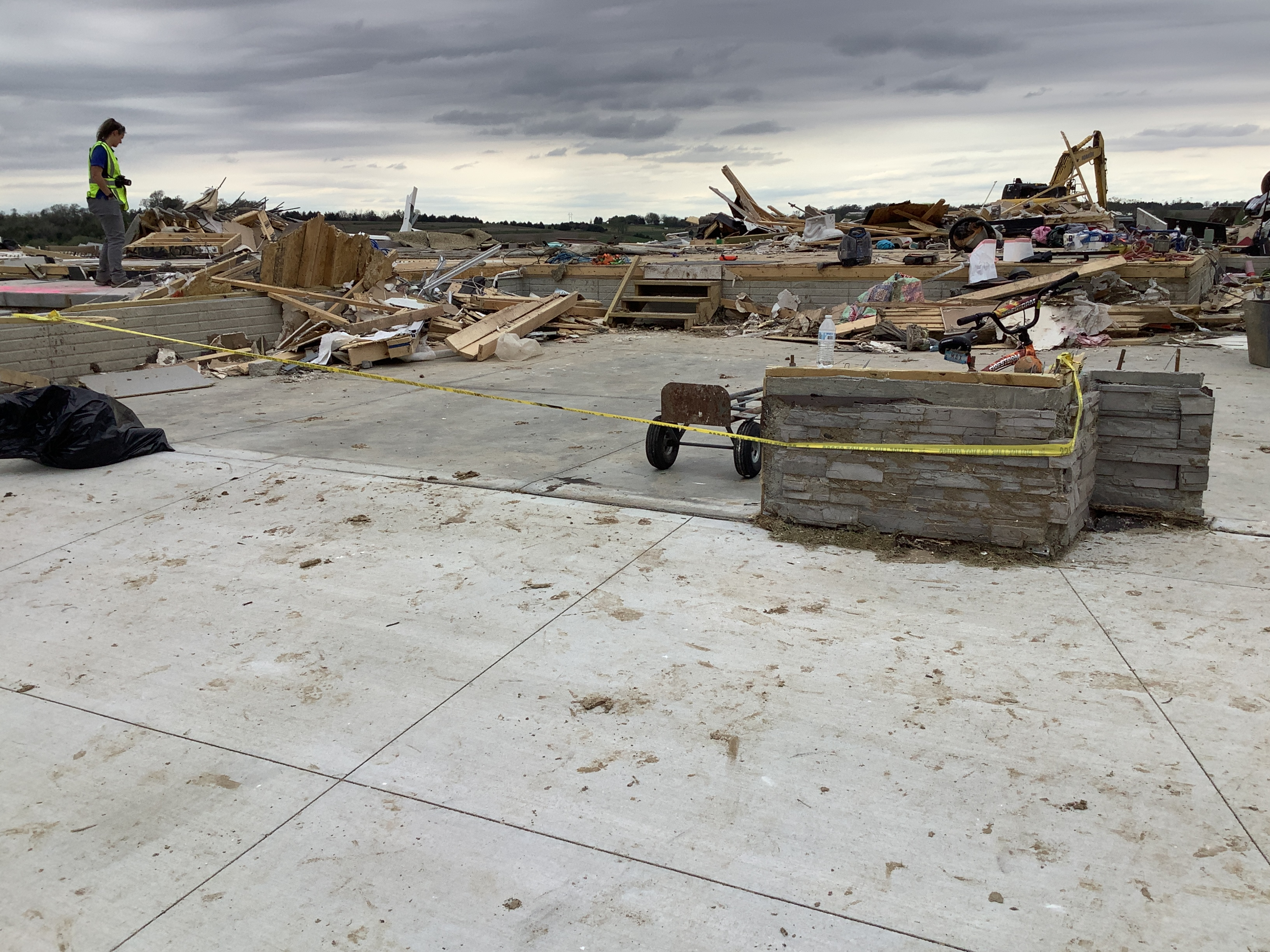
Elkhorn, NE

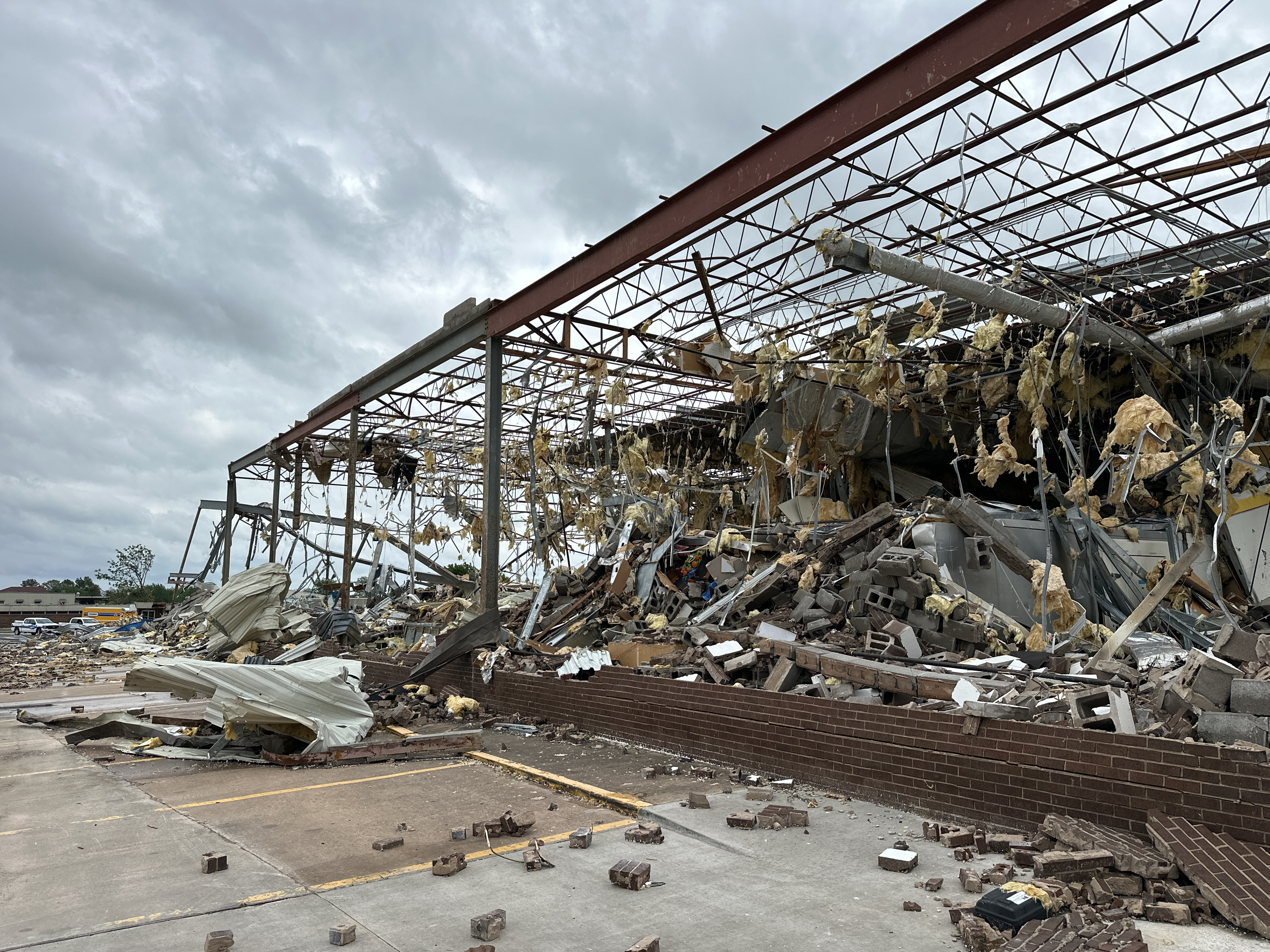
Marietta, OK

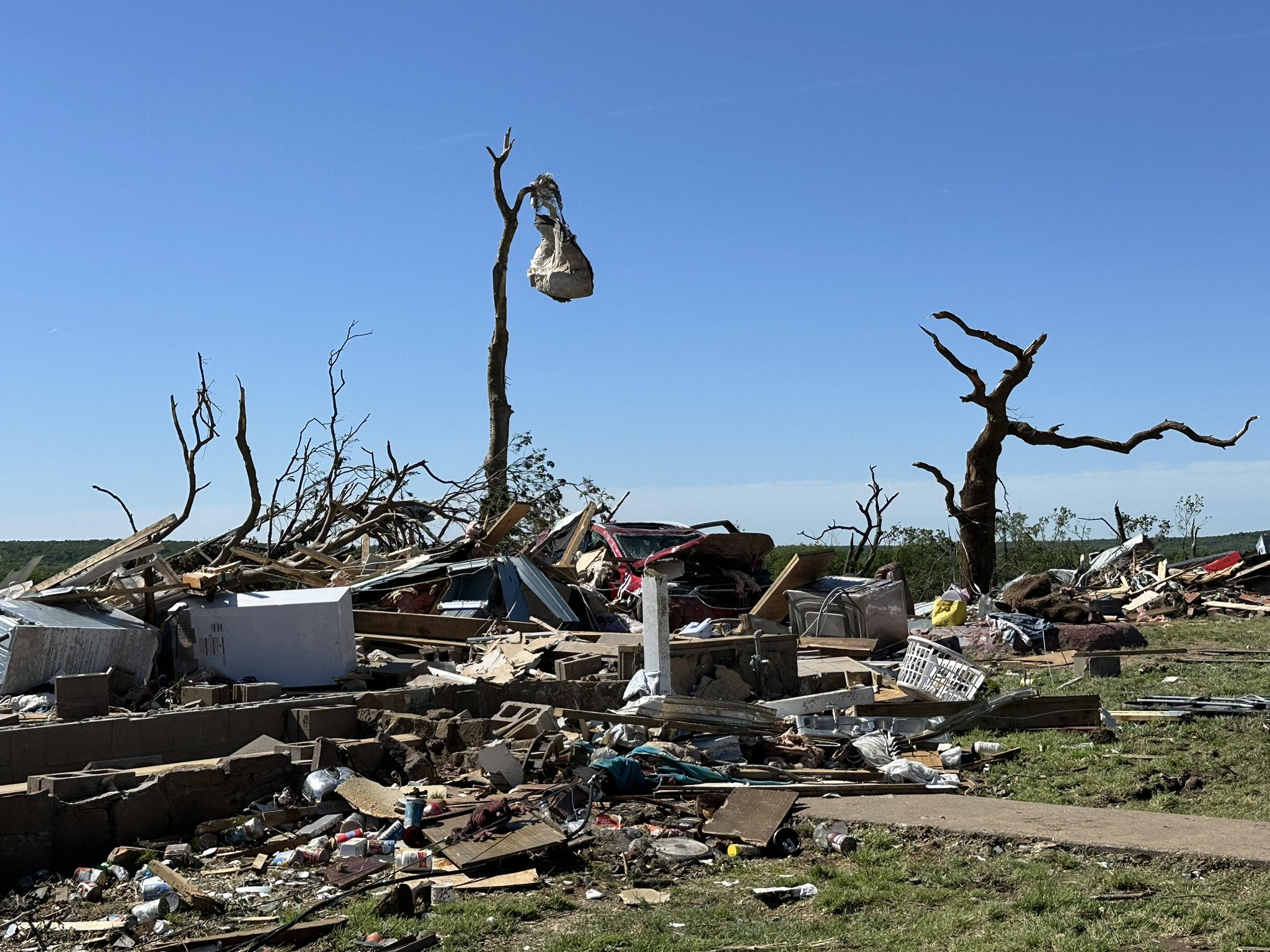
Barnsdall, OK

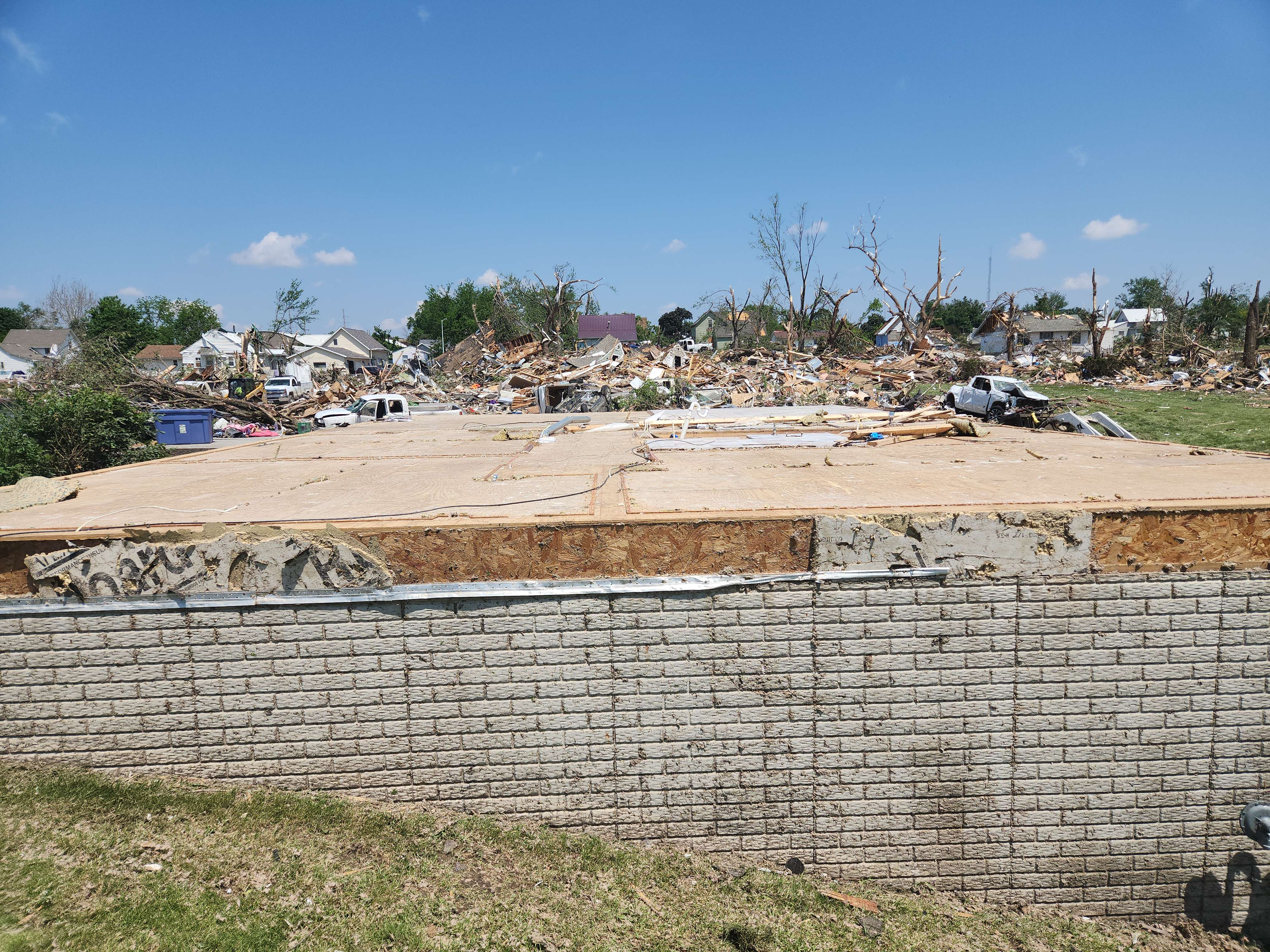
Greenfield, IA

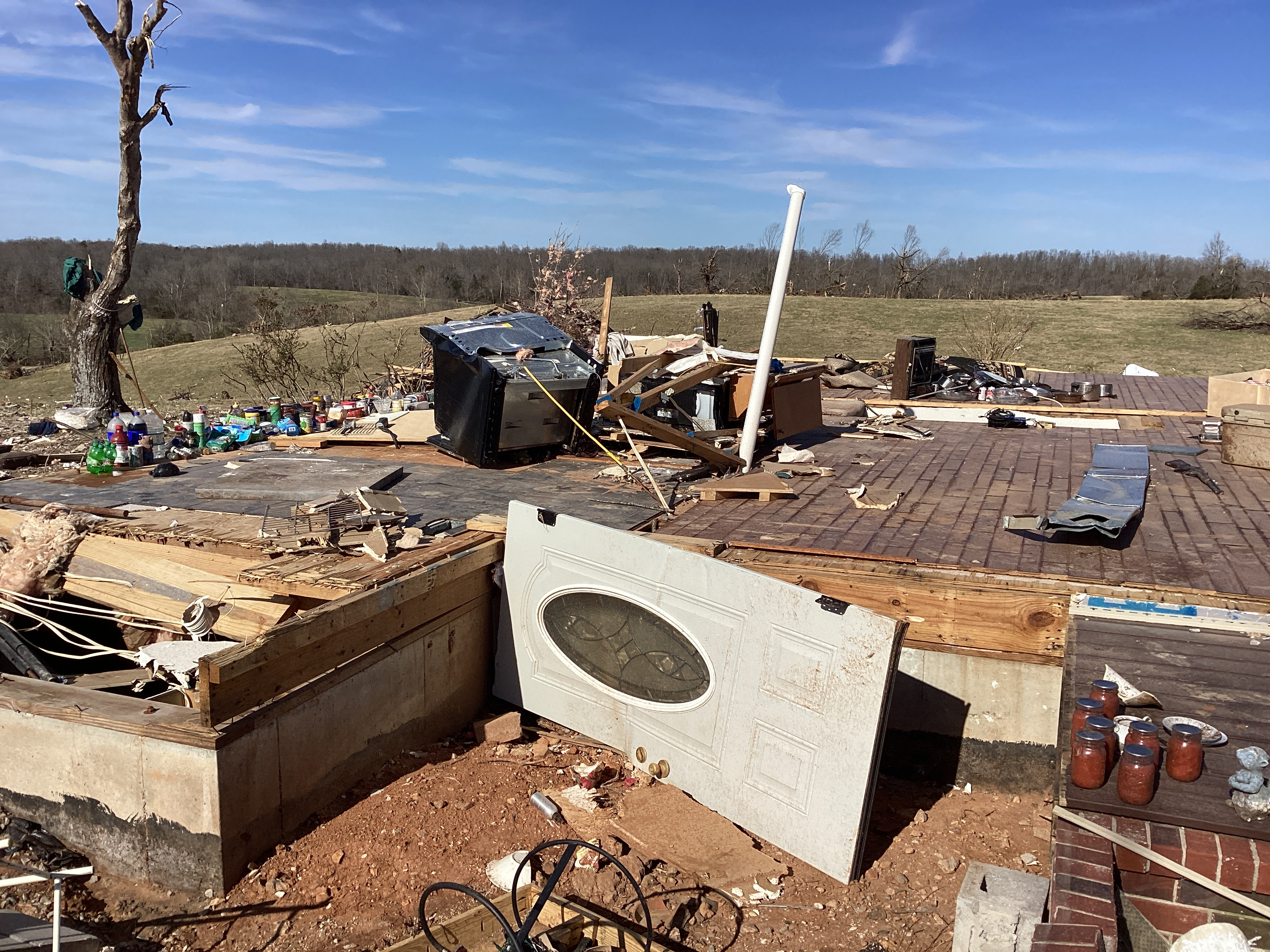
Larkin, AR

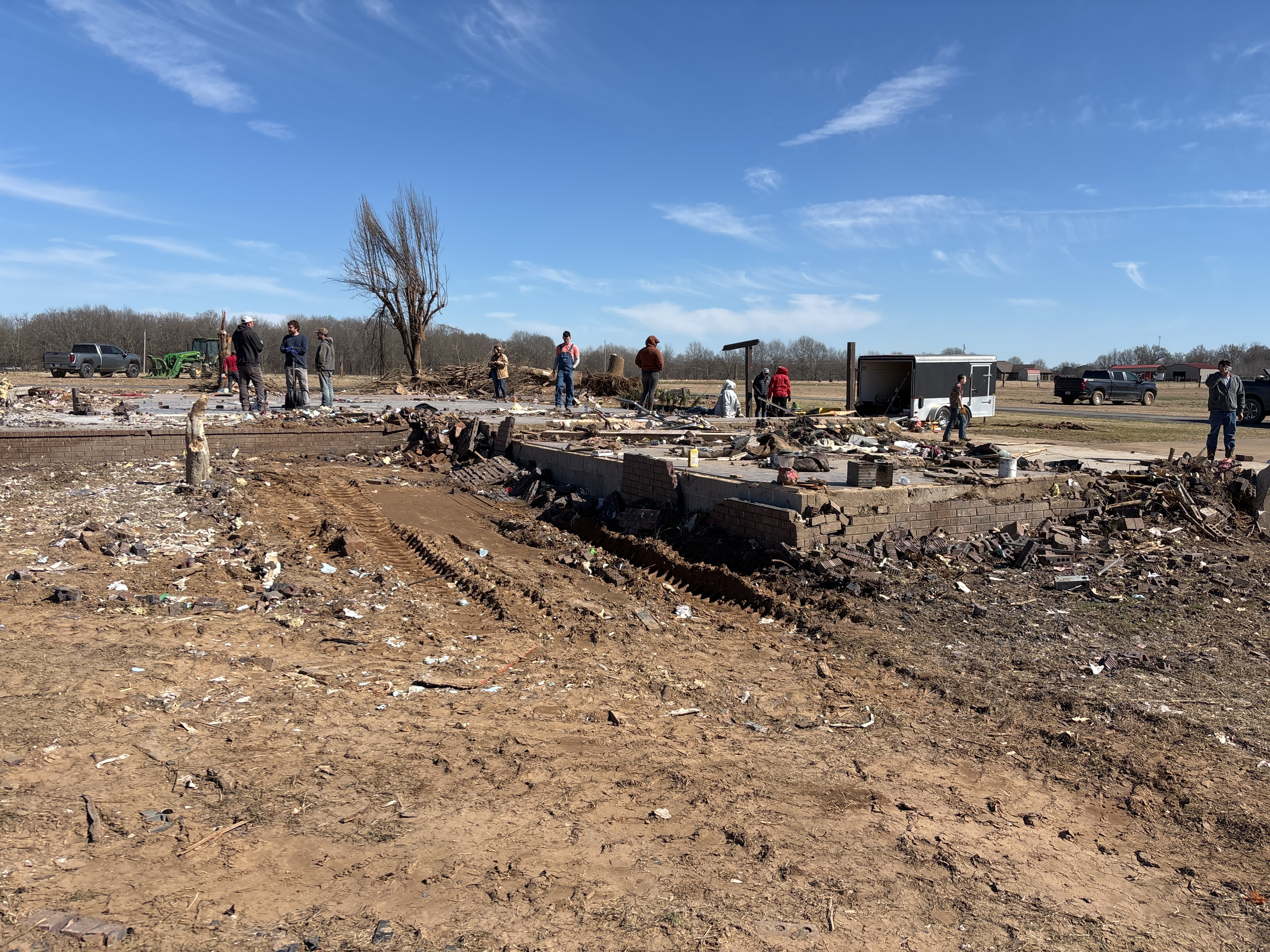
Diaz, AR

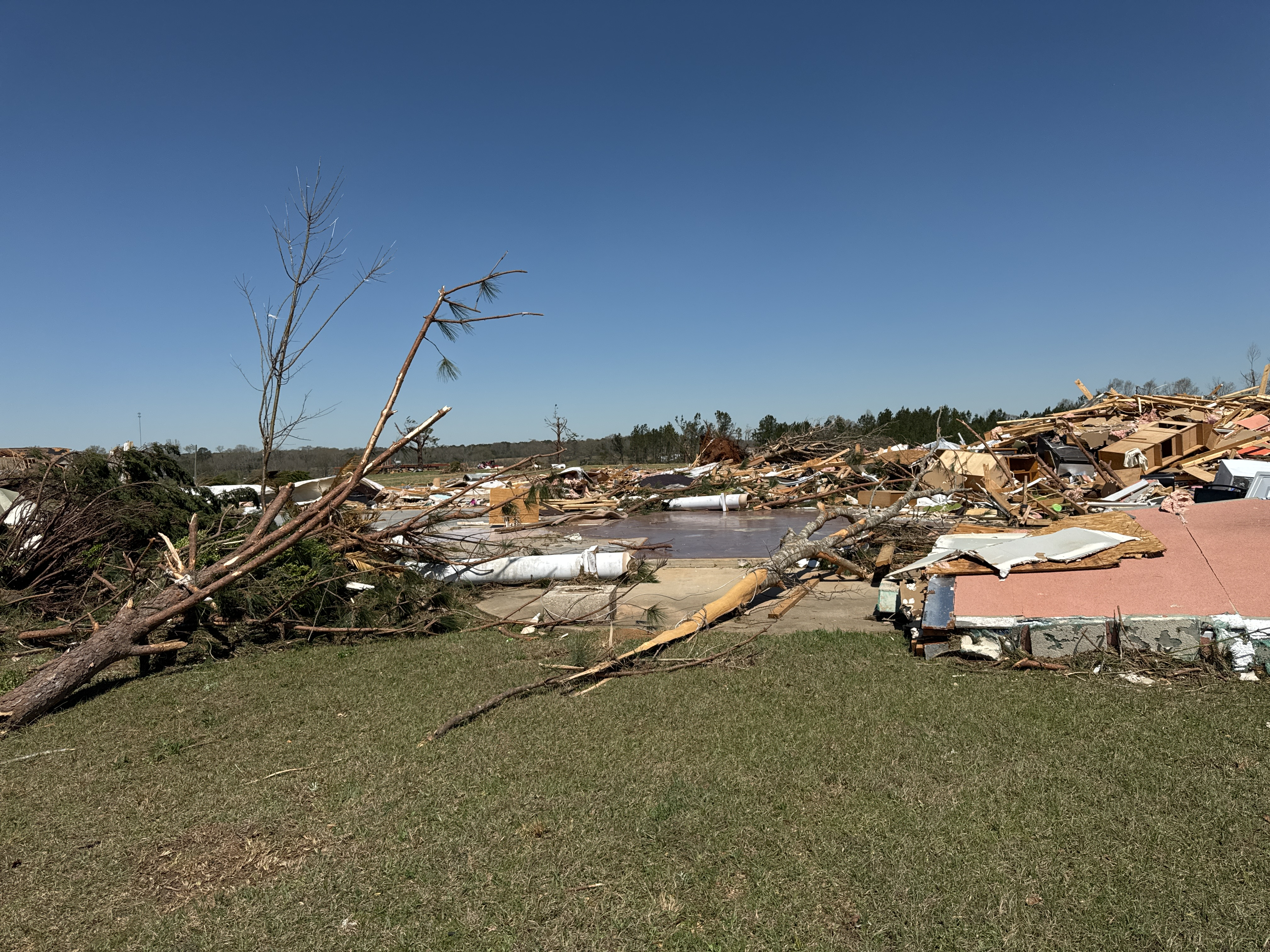
Tylertown, MS

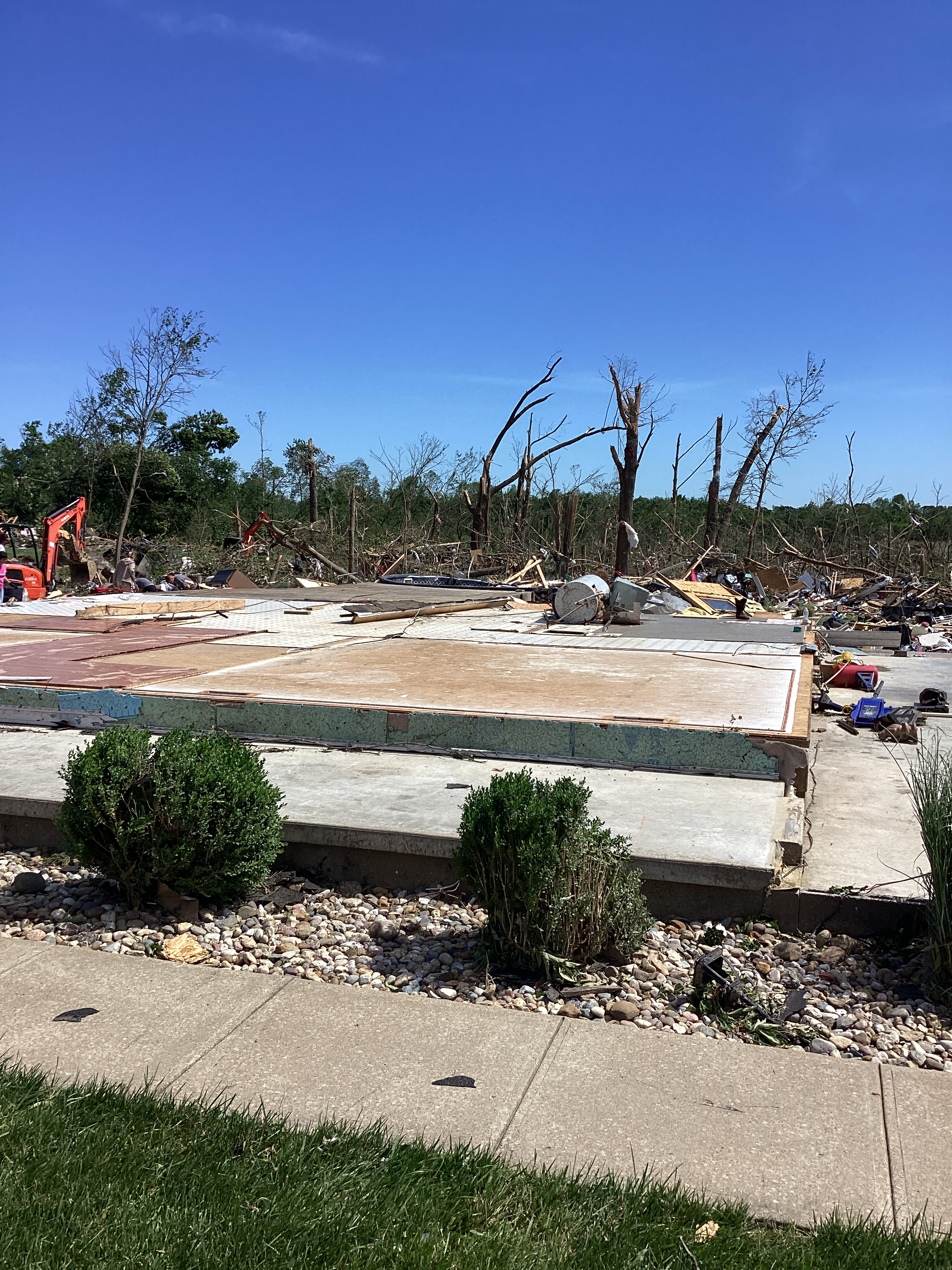
Marion, IL

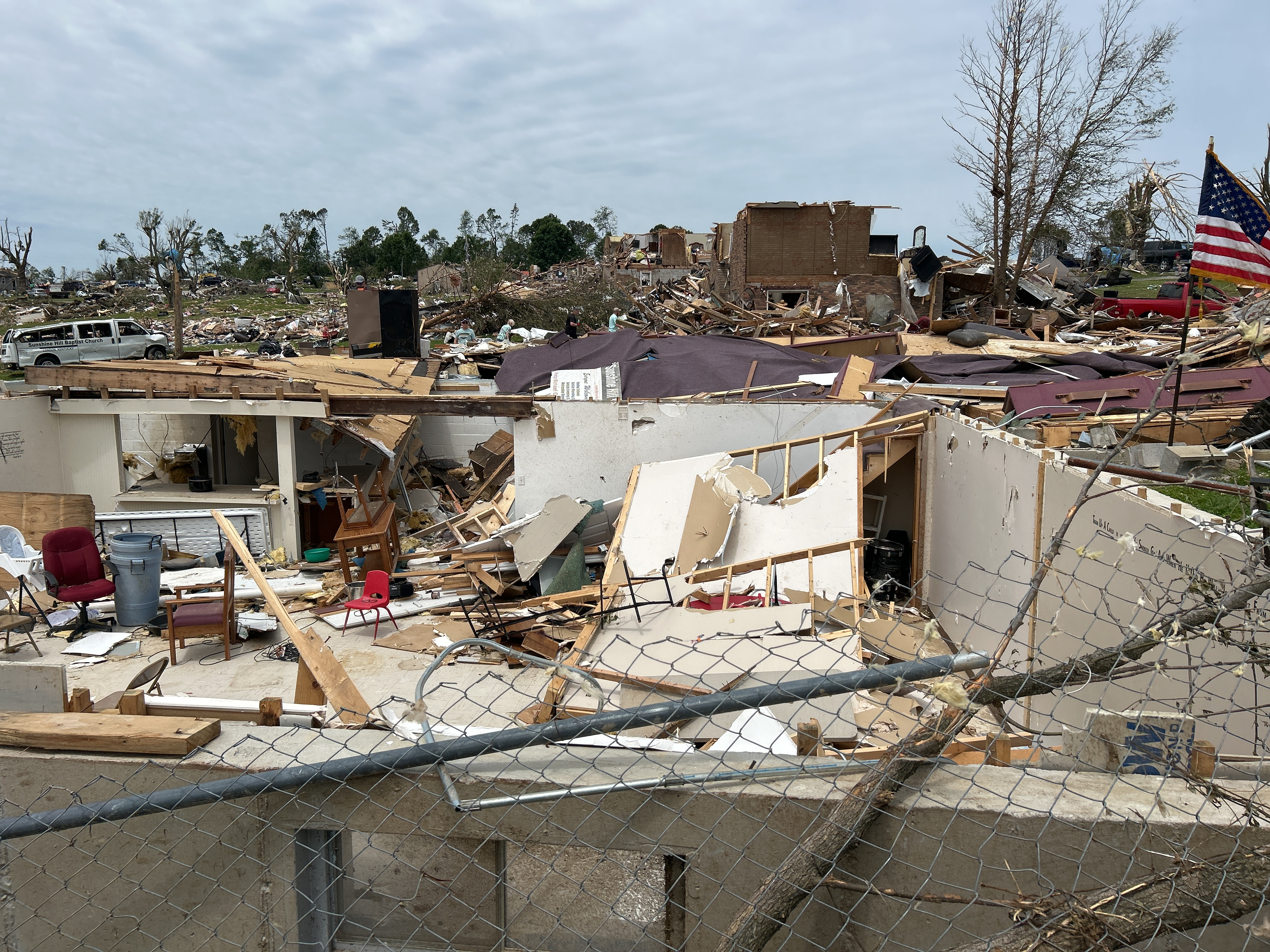
London, KY

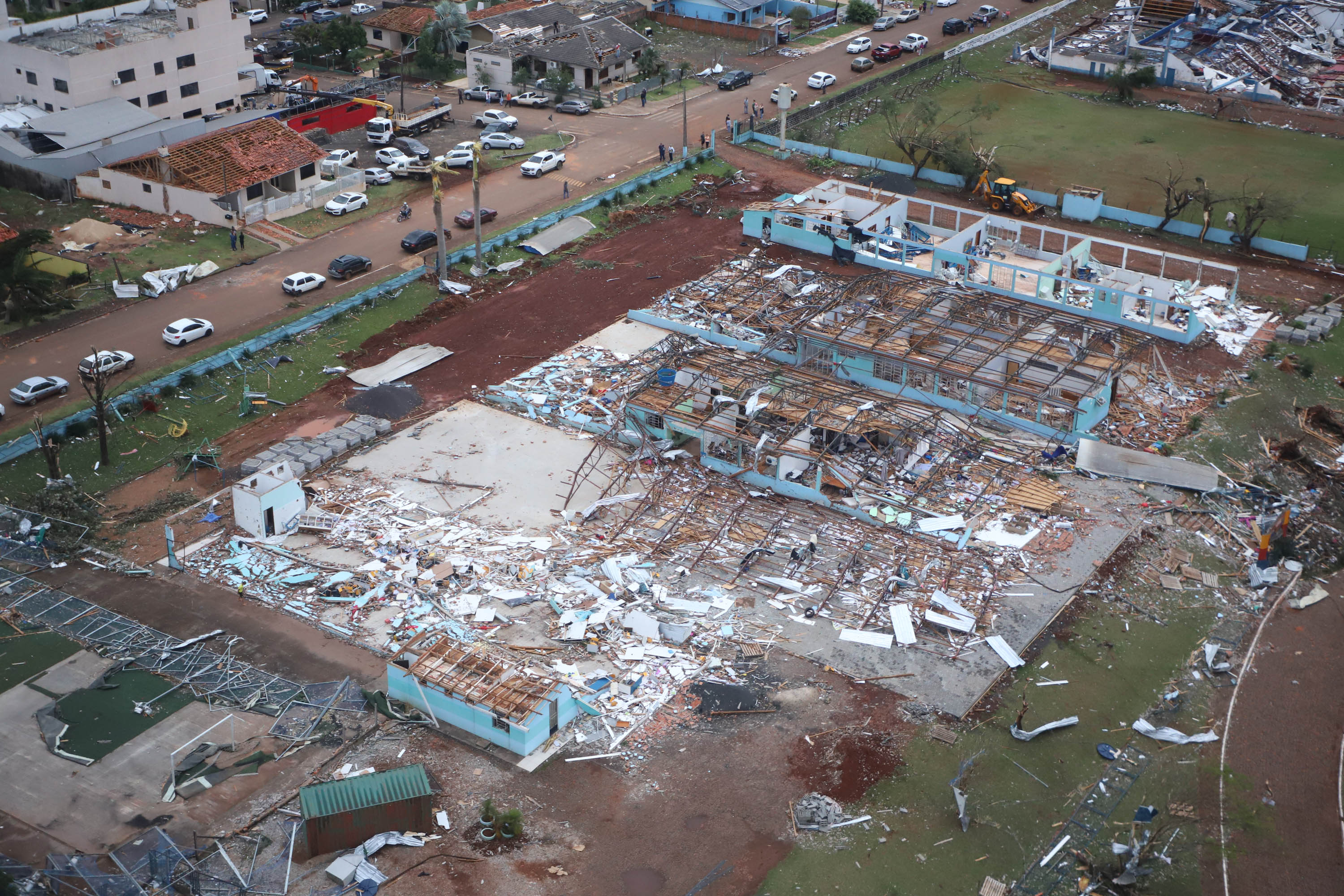
Rio Bonito do Iguaçu, BR

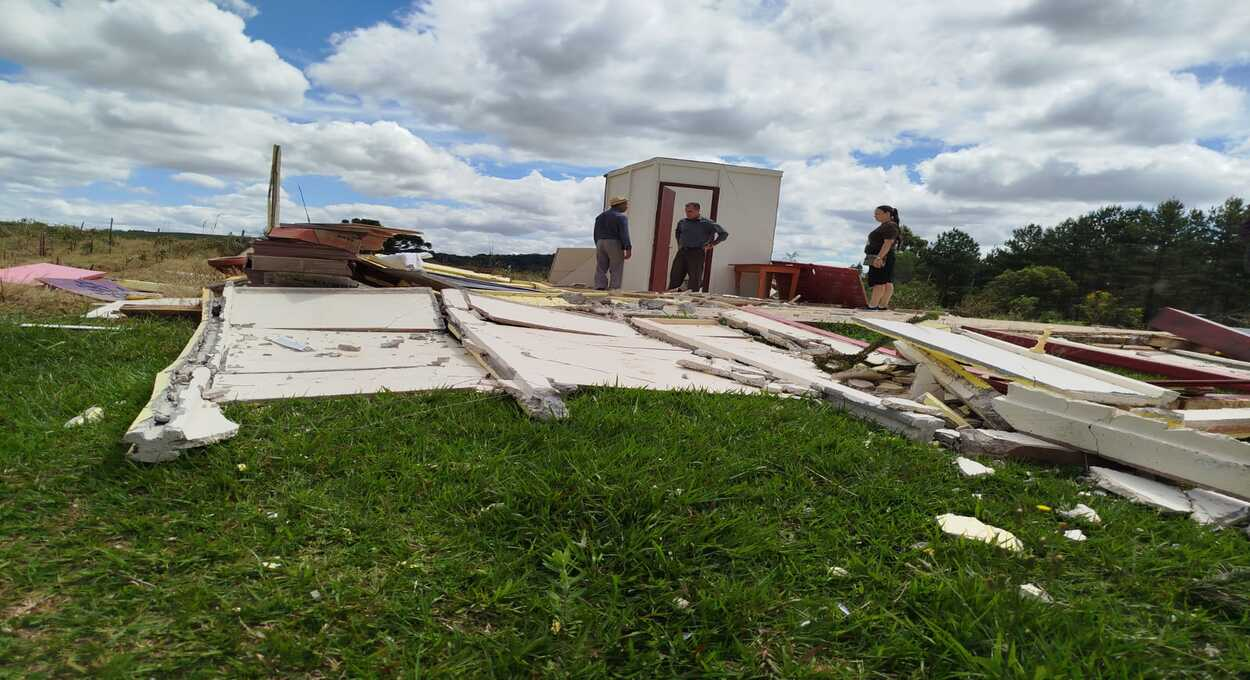
Guarapuava, BR

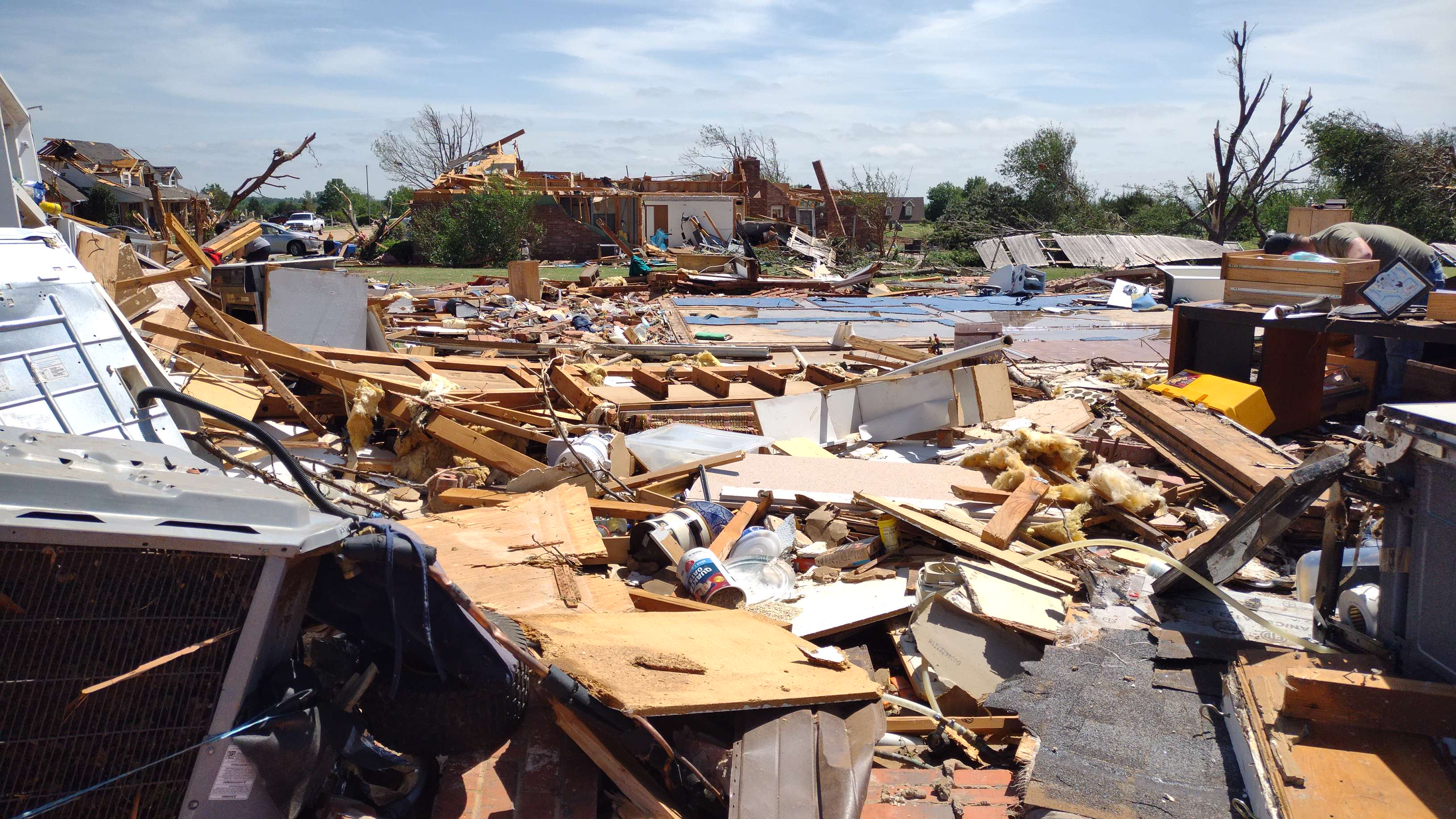
Enid, OK

Giruá, BR

Piraí do Sul, BR

Tornadoes officially rated F4/EF4/IF4 or equivalent (2020–present) (Note: This section is not a full summary of the tornado, but rather a “Why was this rated F4/EF4/IF4" section.)
Day	Year	Country	Subdivision	Location	Fatalities	Injuries	Rated by
March 3	2020	United States	Tennessee	Baxter, Cookeville	19	87	NWS
2020 Baxter–Cookeville tornado — The tornado produced catastrophic damage resulting in entire portions of neighborhoods becoming flattened. Numerous fatalities occurred with at least 17 well-anchored block-foundation homes being leveled or swept away. In addition to vehicles being thrown and destroyed, many trees were denuded and partially debarked in this area, indicating EF4 damage with wind speeds rated at 175 miles per hour (282 km/h). Homes farther away from the center of the damage path lost their roofs and exterior walls.
April 12	2020	United States	Mississippi	Hope, Sartinville, Bassfield	4	3	NWS
2020 Hope–Bassfield tornado — A house was completely swept away, leaving a bare foundation slab. This house was secured to its foundation with anchor bolts, which were found bent, though nearby trees did not sustain damage consistent with a tornado stronger than low-end EF4 strength. Trees were ripped out of the ground with numerous other structures damaged or destroyed along the path of this tornado as well. The tornado caused $2.75 million (2020 USD) in damage.
April 12	2020	United States	Mississippi	Bassfield, Cantwell Mill, Seminary, Collins, Soso, Moss, Pachuta	8	99	NWS
2020 Bassfield–Soso tornado — In Cantwell Mill, a large, anchor-bolted cabin was completely swept away and reduced to a bare slab, with little debris recovered. While this structure was well-anchored, surveyors noted some minor structural defects including a lack of external sheathing and flawed stud-to-sill plate nailing, while trees in the immediate vicinity sustained only partial debarking. Due to these limiting factors, a high-end EF4 rating was applied. Many other structures were destroyed at EF4 intensity along the path of this tornado as well and entire groves of large trees were mowed down and completely stripped of their bark. The massive tornado reached a width of 2.25 miles (3.62 km), making it the widest tornado in Mississippi history and the third-widest on record in the United States.
April 13	2020	United States	South Carolina	Scotia, Estill, Nixville, Fechtig	5	60	NWS
2020 Hampton County tornado — This large, multiple-vortex tornado damaged or destroyed numerous structures. EF4 damage was inflicted on a well-built two-story home that was leveled with only a pile of debris remaining, with some of the debris scattered into the yard. The wind speed estimate in this area was 175 mph (282 km/h). EF2-EF3 damage occurred in many other areas along the path as well.
April 19	2020	United States	Mississippi	Hurricane Creek, Sandy Hook, Pine Burr, Purvis	1	1	NWS
2020 Sandy Hook–Camp Shelby tornado — A well-built house in southwestern Marion County was leveled and partially swept away at low-end EF4 intensity by this long-tracked tornado, and numerous other homes and mobile homes were damaged or destroyed as well. Numerous trees were also snapped and partially debarked along the path. The tornado resulted in $700,000 in damage.
July 8	2020	United States	Minnesota	Dalton	1	2	NWS
2020 Ashby–Dalton tornado — One farmhouse was swept away at low-end EF4 intensity by this tornado. A machine shop was also swept away, leaving behind mangled vehicles and machinery, trees were snapped and debarked, and visible ground scouring was noted. The tornado, described by storm chasers as resembling a "drill bit" at times, killed one person. A photograph of the tornado was also used in the cover for the 2021 disaster film 13 Minutes.
March 25 (Note: This tornado started on the day listed, but continued into the next day.)	2021	United States	Georgia	Franklin, Newnan, Peachtree City	0	0	NWS
2021 Newnan–Peachtree City tornado — The peak damage from the tornado came in Newnan, where multiple large and newly built homes were leveled at low-end EF4 intensity, including some that were partially swept away. Many other areas of intense damage also occurred along the tornado's path as well. The tornado prompted the issuance of three tornado emergencies and caused $20 million (2021 USD) in damage.
June 24	2021	Czech Republic	South Moravian Region	Hrušky, Moravská Nová Ves, Mikulčice, Lužice, Hodonín	6	576	ESSL, CHMI, SHMÚ, Meteopress, Comenius University, Charles University, Tomáš Prouza
2021 South Moravia tornado — One-third of the buildings in Hrušky were destroyed and 85% were damaged, with the most severe damage occurring in the southern half of town. In Moravská Nová Ves and Mikulčice, hundreds of buildings were severely damaged or destroyed, including a few well-built brick and masonry homes that were completely leveled. The concrete exterior walls of structures that remained standing were scarred and impaled by flying projectiles. A few trees were completely stripped clean of all bark. In the town, three locations sustained IF4 damage. The first location was a row of newly built homes. "Here, an IF4 rating was assigned to the damage of three well-built brick structures. One of the brick structures was completely destroyed, which would warrant an IF5 rating. However, a rather weak connection between the roof and the walls was found, which prevented the damage from being assigned an IF5 rating. Another structure that was completely destroyed was still under construction. Debris from the houses were carried over the following field along considerable distances." In Lužice, multiple homes and apartment buildings were damaged or destroyed in the town, and metal-framed industrial buildings and factories were destroyed. In Hodonín, the tornado impacted a densely populated area in the northern part of town. Numerous buildings sustained major structural damage or were destroyed. In all, a total of 1,200 buildings were damaged or destroyed by the IF4 tornado, which had an estimated peak windspeed of 380 km/h (236.1 mph) and 14 different locations sustained IF4 level damage.
December 10	2021	United States	Arkansas, Missouri, Tennessee	Monette, Leachville (Arkansas), Braggadocio (Missouri), Tiptonville, Samburg (Tennessee)	8	16	NWS
2021 Monette–Samburg tornado — A long-tracked wedge and the fifth tornado spawned by the Quad-State supercell damaged or destroyed numerous structures. Multiple structures were swept from their foundation, with only the concrete slab remaining. Low-end EF4 damage occurred in Braggadocio, Missouri, where two homes were destroyed and swept away, and near Tiptonville, Tennessee, where a bait and tackle shop was swept away and reduced to a bare slab. Metal high-tension power poles were bent to the ground as well. The tornado had a path 81.17 miles (130.63 km) long. EF4 damage occurred in Missouri and Tennessee; the maximum damage in Arkansas was rated EF3.
December 10	2021	United States	Tennessee, Kentucky	Woodland Mills (Tennessee), Cayce, Mayfield, Benton, Cambridge Shores, Princeton, Dawson Springs, Bremen (Kentucky)	57	519	NWS
2021 Western Kentucky tornado — A long-tracked wedge and the ninth spawned by the Quad-State supercell, this tornado damaged, destroyed, or obliterated numerous structures along a path of 165.6 miles (266.5 km). Eight of the tornado warnings issued during the event by the NWS offices in Memphis, Tennessee, and Paducah, Kentucky were tornado emergency declarations, the most issued during the month of December. EF4 damage occurred in or near the communities of Cayce, Mayfield, Cambridge Shores, Princeton, Dawson Springs, and Bremen. Dual polarization radar imagery showed that the tornado lofted debris up to 30,000 feet (9,100 m) into the air as it impacted Mayfield. The tornado caused extreme ground scouring in Hickman County with grass and several inches of topsoil removed in multiple locations. In Bremen, a row of four homes was obliterated, with debris scattered and wind-rowed long distances through fields across the street. Concrete floor slabs were torn from the foundation of one home and shattered, while the paved driveway of another residence was cracked and scoured. Peak damage along the path was rated high-end EF4 with winds of 190 mph (310 km/h) based on the damage in Bremen. In 2022, meteorologist and structural and forensic engineer Timothy Marshall noted that "the tornado damage rating might have been higher had more wind resistant structures been encountered" and "the damage likely would have been more severe if the tornado were slower." EF4 damage occurred in Kentucky; the maximum damage in Tennessee was rated EF0.
March 5	2022	United States	Iowa	Macksburg, Winterset, Norwalk, Pleasant Hill, Newton	6	5	NWS
Winterset tornado — A multiple-vortex wedge tornado produced major damage along its path of 70.92 miles (114.13 km). Southwest of Winterset, several homes were severely damaged or destroyed, a few of which were leveled or swept away. Cars were flipped and thrown, outbuildings were obliterated, debris was strewn long distances, and many large trees were snapped and debarked in this area as well. Winds from the tornado in this area were estimated at 170 mph (270 km/h), which officially classifies the tornado as a low-end EF4.
April 5	2022	United States	Georgia	Pembroke, Black Creek	1	12	NWS
2022 Pembroke–Black Creek tornado — A 3/4-mile (1.2 km) wide wedge tornado caused damaged or destroyed numerous structures. Four well-built homes anchor-bolted to their foundations were leveled in Black Creek, including two that were completely swept away with only their bare concrete slab foundations remaining and one with anchor bolts that were bent, indicating EF4 intensity with winds estimated at 185 mph (298 km/h). A person was killed in a mobile home that was destroyed to the east of Black Creek.
November 4	2022	United States	Texas, Oklahoma	Brookston, Caviness, Midcity, Powderly, Arthur City (Texas), Sawyer (Oklahoma)	0	11	NWS
2022 Caviness–Sawyer tornado — A large, nearly mile-wide wedge tornado produced significant damage along a path of 44.69 miles (71.92 km). Southwest of Powderly, a well-constructed, anchor-bolted home was swept away, indicating low-end EF4 intensity with winds estimated at 170 mph (270 km/h). Two nearby homes were also swept away, but they were poorly-anchored and received a high-end EF3 rating instead. EF4 damage occurred in Texas; the maximum damage in Oklahoma was rated low-end EF2.
November 4	2022	United States	Texas, Oklahoma	Clarksville (Texas), Idabel, Broken Bow, Eagletown (Oklahoma)	0	13	NWS
2022 Clarksville–Idabel tornado — A large, violent wedge tornado touched down southwest of Clarksville, severely damaging numerous homes and producing intense tree damage. North of Clarksville, a well-constructed residence was completely swept away with only a bare concrete slab remaining. The home's walls had large heavy-duty nails attaching them to the frame of the house which was removed from the foundation along with some of the nails. Debris from the home was broken into small pieces and strewn northeast into a field 50–200 yards away. Winds here were estimated to be 170 mph (270 km/h). Ten people living in the residence sheltered in an in-ground oil pit inside a small outbuilding, which was also swept away, but all escaped uninjured. The tornado later caused severe damage on the southeast side of Idabel as well. EF4 damage occurred in Texas; the maximum damage in Oklahoma was rated EF3.
March 24	2023	United States	Mississippi	Rolling Fork, Midnight, Silver City	17	165	NWS, NSSL, CIWRO, NIST, Haag Engineering
2023 Rolling Fork tornado — A long-tracked, violent tornado directly impacted Rolling Fork and Silver City, as well as many surrounding areas, including Midnight, resulting in catastrophic damage. The tornado was at its peak intensity of high-end EF4 in Rolling Fork, destroying many homes, mobile homes, businesses, and other structures, shredding many trees and power lines, and scouring the ground northeast of town. A floral shop was leveled and partially swept away, which received the highest EF4 rating, with winds estimated at 195 miles per hour (314 km/h). The survey team noted that the tornado may have peaked at EF5 intensity at this location, but they were not confident enough to make the upgrade. EF4 damage occurred southwest of and northeast of Rolling Fork, and low-end EF4 tree damage and ground scouring also occurred east of Anguilla as well.
March 31	2023	United States	Iowa	Keota, Wellman	0	3	NWS
2023 Keota–Wellman tornado — One house was completely swept off its foundation at low-end EF4 intensity near Keota. A car at a different destroyed house was tossed about 1,000 ft (300 m) into a field and trees were completely debarked with only stubs remaining. The tornado also caused damage near Wellman.
July 1	2023	Canada	Alberta	Didsbury	0	1	ECCC, PASPC, NTP
2023 Didsbury tornado – Twelve houses were damaged or destroyed, including one well-built house that was collapsed at low-end EF4 intensity, with debris scattered downwind. Trees were debarked, the ground was scoured, and a combine weighing nearly 22,000 lb (10,000 kg) was thrown and rolled.
April 26	2024	United States	Nebraska, Iowa	Elkhorn, Bennington, Blair (Nebraska), Modale (Iowa)	0	4	NWS
2024 Elkhorn–Blair tornado — This tornado caused widespread damage on the northwestern part of the Omaha metropolitan area. Multiple homes on the west side of Elkhorn and south of Blair were destroyed at low-end EF4 intensity. EF4 damage occurred in Nebraska; the maximum damage in Iowa was EF1.
April 27	2024	United States	Oklahoma	Marietta, Lake Murray, Dickson, Baum	1	6	NWS
2024 Marietta–Dickson–Baum tornado — This tornado caused significant damage along its path, especially at the beginning of its path in Love County in and near Marietta. Low-end EF4 damage occurred on the west side of Marietta, where a Dollar General store and a Homeland grocery store were partially destroyed. The tornado killed a person on I-35 just prior to reaching its peak intensity.
May 6	2024	United States	Oklahoma	Barnsdall, Bartlesville	2	33	NWS
2024 Barnsdall–Bartlesville tornado — A large, nearly mile-wide wedge tornado produced major damage along a path of 40.8 miles (65.7 km). The tornado reached peak intensity with winds estimated up to 180 mph (290 km/h) just to the southwest of Barnsdall, where a well-built home was completely destroyed. A two-story home on the east side of Barnsdall was also leveled at low-end EF4 intensity. Multiple vehicles were thrown and rolled, and trees were stubbed and debarked in this area.
May 21	2024	United States	Iowa	Greenfield	5	35	NWS
2024 Greenfield tornado — This long-tracked tornado moved through three other counties before destroying several homes at low-end EF4 intensity in rural Adair County. The most severe damage occurred in Greenfield in the central part of the county, where the tornado peaked at mid-range EF4 intensity. Numerous homes were leveled, including some that were swept away, and mobile homes and outbuildings were obliterated.
March 14	2025	United States	Arkansas, Missouri	Fifty-Six, Franklin, Ash Flat, Ozark Acres, Ravenden Springs (Arkansas), Pratt, Pulaski, Fairdealing (Missouri)	0	4	NWS
2025 Fifty-Six–Larkin tornado — This tornado swept away a well-built home northwest of Larkin at low-end EF4 intensity, causing an extensive debris field downstream. After briefly weakening, the tornado reattained low-end EF4 status as a multi-level farmhouse was swept away along County Road 103. South of Franklin, another home was destroyed with winds estimated at 170 mph (270 km/h). EF4 damage occurred in Arkansas; maximum damage in Missouri was EF2.
March 14	2025	United States	Arkansas	Jacksonport, Diaz, Campbell Station	0	2	NWS
2025 Diaz–Campbell Station tornado — This tornado struck a farmstead east of the community of Macks, a well-built office was leveled at low-end EF4 intensity. The tornado then struck a neighborhood near Diaz, destroying and partially sweeping a large, well-anchored home at high-end EF4 rating with peak wind speeds estimated at 190 mph (310 km/h).
March 15	2025	United States	Louisiana, Mississippi	Kentwood (Louisiana), Tylertown, Bassfield (Mississippi)	6	14	NWS
2025 Kentwood–Carson tornado — The tornado intensified to low-end EF4 intensity, a well-built two story home was swept away northwest of Tylertown. At the end of its track, the tornado re-intensified to low-end EF4 status, sweeping away a wooden-framed home. The tornado traveled 67.64 mi (108.86 km). EF1 damage occurred in Louisiana; maximum damage in Mississippi was EF4.
May 16	2025	United States	Illinois	Hudgens, Marion	0	7	NWS
2025 Marion tornado — A well-built, two story home along Kyler Court was swept clean off its foundation at 190 mph (310 km/h). Trees behind the home were violently debarked and reduced to stubs.
May 16	2025	United States	Kentucky	Somerset, London	18	108	NWS
2025 Somerset–London tornado — The tornado entered the Daniel Boone National Forest, where it intensified to low-end EF4 intensity for the first time, demolishing a home along Poplarville Road. Nearby trees were also violently debarked and stubbed in this location. Later on, the tornado struck the southern side of London. Numerous homes in the Sunshine Hills subdivision of London were completely destroyed at low-end EF4 intensity with winds of 170 mph (270 km/h). Many homes were wiped clean from their foundations, with vehicles thrown and trees debarked with only the stubs of the largest limbs left.
November 7	2025	Brazil	Paraná	Rio Bonito do Iguaçu	5	835	PREVOTS, MetSul Meteorologia, Simepar
2025 Rio Bonito do Iguaçu tornado — Various reinforced masonry structures were partially or completely destroyed, including houses, a school, a church, and two stores. Reinforced concrete columns that supported the masonry walls of these structures were found broken and twisted. There was intense uprooting of trees, with some trees having been reduced to trunks. An estimated 90% of structures in Rio Bonito do Iguaçu were damaged or destroyed.
November 7	2025	Brazil	Paraná	Candói, Guarapuava	1	20	PREVOTS, Simepar
2025 Candói–Guarapuava tornado — Extreme sweeping of dense hardwood trees were found at two points along the path of this tornado. Ground scouring was also noted at these points. A large commercial container was hurled 165 m (180 yd).
April 23	2026	United States	Oklahoma	Enid	0	10	NWS
2026 Enid tornado — Multiple well-built homes were leveled at low-end EF4 intensity south of Enid in the Grayridge neighborhood. The tornado continued north-east and struck a farmstead, damaging and destroying multiple metal buildings. Vehicles were tossed and violently destroyed. The tornado then struck a poorly anchored home at its peak intensity. The home was swept completely off its foundation with winds estimated at 180 mph (290 km/h). Near the house extreme tree debarking and heavy ground scouring were reported.
May 3	2026	Syria, Turkey	Aleppo (Syria), Kilis, Gaziantep (Turkey)	Ayyasha (Syria), Çangallı, Akçamezra, Çaybeyi, Kayacık (Turkey)	0	2	ESSL, Jonathan Stichnoth
2026 Akçamezra tornado — Pistachio trees in an orchard in Çaybeyi were heavily debarked, in some cases with more than 60% of the bark removed, and some trees were ripped out of the ground and lofted a short distance.
July 28	2026	Brazil	Rio Grande do Sul	Giruá, Senador Salgado Filho, Sete de Setembro	0	7	PREVOTS, UFSM, MetSul Meteorologia
2026 Giruá tornado — This tornado was initially rated high-end F3 by PREVOTS, before later upgrading the tornado to F4 based on treefall pattern analysis at three forested regions, the first region indicated EF4/F4 intensity. Native hardwood trees with 60% of their trunks debarked were also noted.
August 8	2026	Brazil	Paraná	Piraí do Sul, Jaguariaíva	0	1	PREVOTS
2026 Piraí do Sul tornado — In some places, a 30 cm (about 1 ft) trench was dug by the tornado. PREVOTS rated the tornado F4 due to hardwood trees that were completely debranched and had over 60% of their bark peeled away and sandpapered, along with the ground scouring.

== See also ==
- Tornado intensity and damage
- List of tornadoes and tornado outbreaks
- List of F5, EF5, and IF5 tornadoes
- List of F4, EF4, and IF4 tornadoes
  - List of F4 tornadoes (1960–1969)
  - List of F4 and EF4 tornadoes (2000–2009)
  - List of F4 and EF4 tornadoes (2010–2019)
- List of F3, EF3, and IF3 tornadoes (2020–present)
- List of tornadoes striking downtown areas
- Tornado myths
- Meteorology in the 21st century
