= Prairie and Arctic Storm Prediction Centre =

Agency overview
- Formed: October 2003; 23 years ago
- Preceding agency: Prairie Storm Prediction Centre (1998—2003)
- Jurisdiction: Government of Canada
- Headquarters: Edmonton, Alberta Winnipeg, Manitoba
- Employees: ~40
- Parent agency: Environment and Climate Change Canada
- Child agency: Meteorological Service of Canada
- Website: ECCC Thunderstorm Outlooks

The Prairie and Arctic Storm Prediction Centre (PASPC), is tasked with forecasting weather for the public and mariners in the Canadian Prairie Provinces, the Northwest Territories, Nunavut Territory, and adjacent domestic waters. The PASPC operations are split between an office in Winnipeg, Manitoba and an office in Edmonton, Alberta. The agency provides continuous weather monitoring and issues weather forecasts, weather warnings and weather watches as a part of this process. Daily severe weather discussions are issued to give additional information on a region that is becoming a severe weather threat, stating whether a watch or warning is likely and details thereof.

The agency is one of five weather forecast centres for the Meteorological Service of Canada. The other four weather centres are the Pacific and Yukon Storm Prediction Centre (Vancouver, British Columbia), the Ontario Storm Prediction Centre (Toronto, Ontario), the Quebec Storm Prediction Centre (Montreal, Quebec), and the Atlantic Storm Prediction Centre (Dartmouth, Nova Scotia). The Atlantic Storm Prediction Centre also houses the Canadian Hurricane Centre plus manages the Newfoundland and Labrador Weather Office (Gander, Newfoundland and Labrador). Each storm prediction centre provides continuous public and marine forecasts and warnings for various parts of Canada's sovereign territory. Aviation weather forecasts are produced separately by the two offices (Edmonton and Montreal) of the Canadian Meteorological Aviation Centre. The PASPC has the largest forecast area of responsibility among the five Storm Prediction Centres, covering a region greater than the other four offices combined; approximately 8,270,000 km² of Canada's territorial land and water.

The Prairie and Arctic Storm Prediction Center is part of the Meteorological Service of Canada (MSC), operating under the control of the Canadian federal department of Environment and Climate Change Canada (ECCC).

== History ==
The Prairie and Arctic Storm Prediction was created in 2003. Prior to that, weather forecasting for the Canadian Prairies and the Canadian Arctic had evolved significantly over the previous century. The PASPC's creation was the culmination of decades of transition within the Canadian weather service during this period.

The Meteorological Service of Canada was founded in 1871. The first forecasts were prepared in 1876 and 1887 from Toronto, Ontario. These forecasts were primarily for marine interests along the Canadian Atlantic coast and the Great Lakes. As the observing and telegraph networks expanded westward to the Prairie provinces, regular forecasts for southern Manitoba were established in 1899 and for Alberta and Saskatchewan in 1903. By this time, a second weather forecast had opened in Victoria, British Columbia but only produced forecasts for that province.

The number of forecast offices, including one in Winnipeg, expanded in the late 1930s to support Trans-Canada Airlines which was established in 1937. During the war, additional weather centres, including ones in Edmonton, Whitehorse (Yukon Territory), Lethbridge, Alberta, and CFB Rivers (Manitoba), were added in support of Canadian civilian aviation and military operations. The Winnipeg office provided some basic forecasts for the Canadian public in the Prairies. The Lethbridge office also provided "storm forecasts" for parts of southern Alberta.

After the war, the public weather forecast system, which was still being done out of Toronto for all of Canada east of the Rockies, was decentralized. Regional forecast centres were established in 1946 in Vancouver, Edmonton, Winnipeg, Toronto, Montreal, and Halifax. The Edmonton office was responsible for Alberta, Yukon, and the western half of Saskatchewan, while the Winnipeg office was now responsible for eastern Saskatchewan, Manitoba, and Northwestern Ontario.

The advent of numerical weather prediction in the early 1960s changed the forecasting system in Canada to one of large regional forecast centres, called "Weather Centrals", with local support offices called "Weather Offices". For the Canadian prairie provinces and the arctic territories, the Prairie Weather Central was established in Winnipeg by 1967. The smaller Weather Offices in support of the Prairie Weather Central included Edmonton, Whitehorse and Regina, Saskatchewan.

In 1971, the weather service was moved to Environment Canada, a new Federal Department. The Weather Centrals became "Weather Centres". The newly renamed Prairie Weather Centre (PrWC) still operated out of Winnipeg and its area of responsibility was the provinces of Saskatchewan and Manitoba and Northwestern Ontario. In Edmonton, the forecast responsibilities were expanded to two new co-located weather offices: the Arctic Weather Centre (ArWC) and the Alberta Weather Centre (AlWC). Forecasts for the Yukon were now formally provided by the Yukon Weather Office. The Regina Weather Office remained open but was eventually closed in 1979.

In 1993 and 1994, the Canadian weather service consolidated its 54 smaller weather briefing offices and eight weather centres into 17 new "Environmental Services Centres". The Prairie Weather Centre was broken up into the Saskatchewan Environmental Services Centre, based in Saskatoon, the Manitoba Environmental Services Centre in Winnipeg and the Northwestern Ontario Environmental Services Centre in Thunder Bay. The Alberta Weather Centre was split into the Northern Alberta Environmental Services Centre in Edmonton and the Southern Alberta Environmental Services Centre is Calgary. Arctic weather forecasting continued to be done out of Arctic Weather Centre in Edmonton (co-located with the Northern Alberta Environmental Services Centre) and the Yukon Weather office.

In 1998, the Edmonton, Calgary, Saskatoon and Winnipeg offices were consolidated into the new Prairie Storm Prediction Centre (PSPC) based in Winnipeg. The new office was responsible for all public and marine forecasts and warnings for the three Prairie Provinces. However, the aviation forecasting responsibilities for these offices were moved to the new Prairie and Arctic Aviation Weather Centre (PAAWC) in Edmonton. The PAAWC was also responsible for all public and marine forecasts and warnings for the Northwest Territories, Nunavut Territory and adjacent waters in the Canadian Arctic. The Yukon Weather Office was closed and the Yukon forecasts were transferred to the Kelowna (British Columbia) Environmental Services Office. The new PSPC was the only office in the Canadian weather service to adopt the "Storm Prediction Centre" name; a name to reflect the office's greater operational focus on hazardous weather.

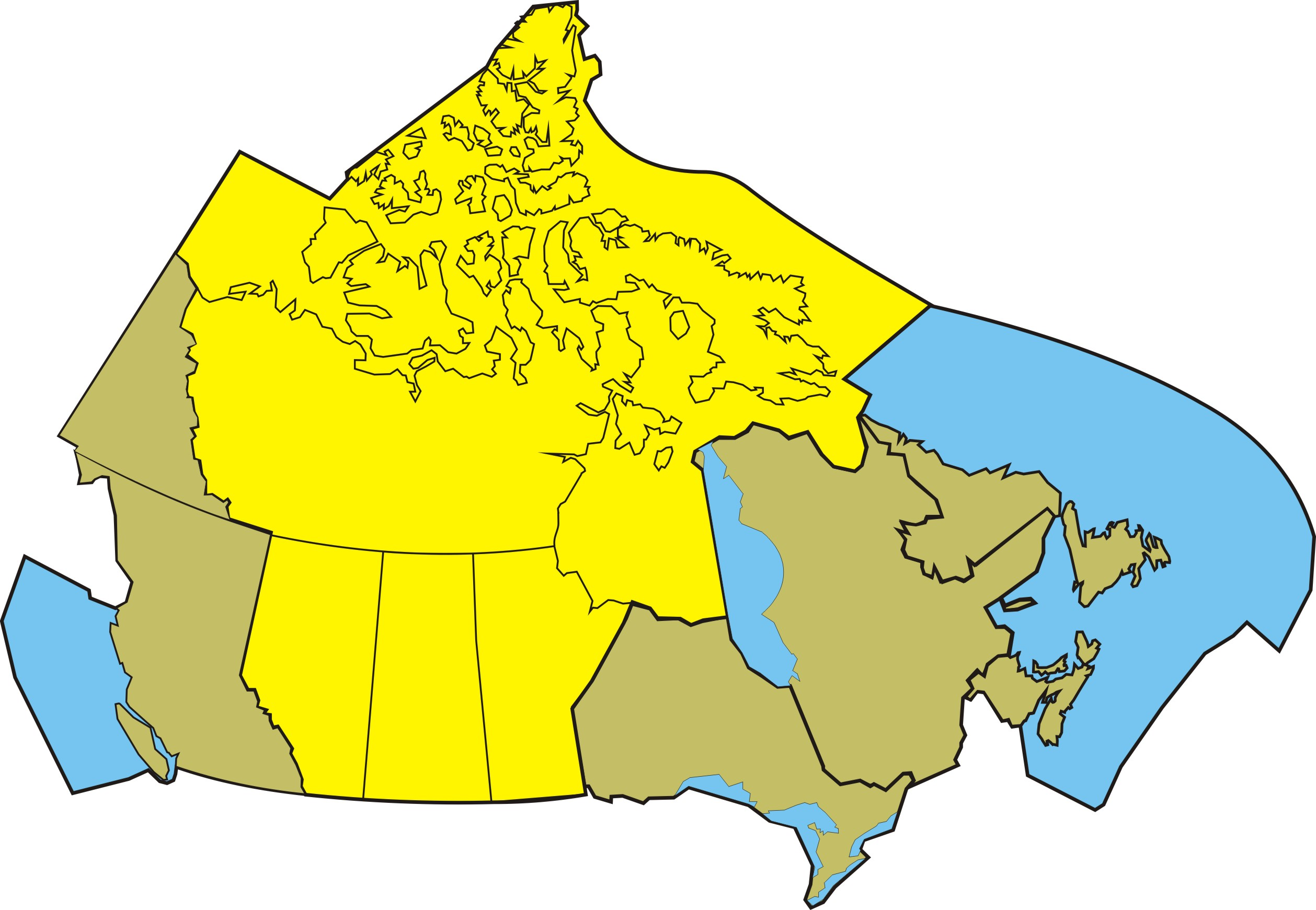
PASPC's area of responsibility (yellow). This area does not include the recently added METAREAs XVII and XVIII.

In 2003, another MSC restructuring amalgamated the PSPC, the PAAWC and all of the 11 remaining Canadian Environmental Services Centres into five Storm Prediction Centres; adopting the naming convention and forecasting approach pioneered five years earlier by the PSPC. The public and marine forecast and warning responsibilities from the PSPC and the PAAWC were combined into the new Prairie and Arctic Storm Prediction Centre (PASPC). The aviation responsibilities for all of western Canada and the Arctic now fell under the responsibility of the new Canadian Meteorological Aviation Centre (CMAC - West). The Yukon Territory forecasts were transferred from Kelowna to the renamed Pacific Storm Prediction Centre in Vancouver. The PASPC amalgamation was preceded with controversy. Leaked information prior to the official announcement indicated that only five public and marine weather forecast offices across the country would remain open. The information indicated that the Winnipeg location, home of the Prairie Storm Prediction Centre, was to close and that all of its forecasting responsibilities would move to the new PASPC in Edmonton. Public and political backlash resulted in a modest change to the original plan. The officially announced plan resulted in the new Prairie and Arctic Storm Prediction Centre having its staff split between the Winnipeg and Edmonton locations.

In 2007, meteorologists from the PASPC assessed the damage of a tornado at Elie, Manitoba to be F5 on the Fujita Scale. The Elie, Manitoba tornado was Canada's first recorded F5 tornado.

In 2011, the Canadian Government announced that the PASPC would be responsible for new Arctic Ocean METAREA forecasts for METAREA XVII and METAREA XVIII.
