= METAREA =

METAREAs are geographical sea regions for the purpose of coordinating the transmission of meteorological information to mariners on international voyages through international and territorial waters. These regions are part of the Global Maritime Distress Safety System. The regions are identical to NAVAREAs which are used to coordinate the transmission of navigational hazards to the same mariners. Mariners receive the meteorological and navigational information via NAVTEX. The Worldwide Met-Ocean Information and Warning Service Sub Committee of the WMO Services Commission is responsible for the coordination of the dissemination of this information for METAREAs.

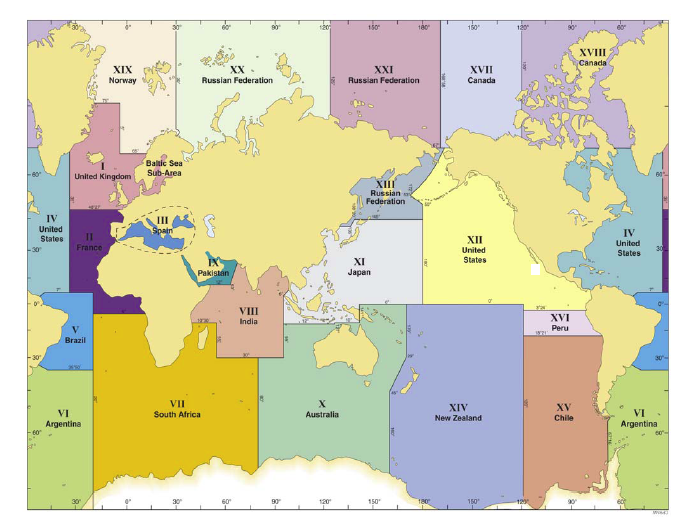
Map of all NAVAREAs. A similar map exists for METAREAs, with only slight changes to areas III and VIII.

== METAREA Descriptions ==
Countries responsible for the issuance of the final METAREA bulletins are known as the "Issuing Services". Since METAREAs often straddle the territorial waters of more than one country, more than one nation may contribute to the content of the METAREAs bulletins. Countries contributing to the METAREAs bulletins are known as "Preparation Services". The current METAREA Coordinator list is updated by WMO.

METAREA	ISSUING SERVICE	PREPARATION SERVICE	COVERAGE
METAREA I	United Kingdom of Great Britain and Northern Ireland	United Kingdom of Great Britain and Northern Ireland	The North Atlantic Ocean east of 35°W, from 48°27'N to 75°N including the North Sea and Baltic Sea sub-area
METAREA II	France	France	Atlantic waters east of 35°W, from 7°N to 48°27'N, and east of 20°W from 7°N to 6°S, including the Straits of Gibraltar
METAREA III	Greece (Hellas)	France (western Mediterranean Sea)	Atlantic waters east of 35°W, from 7°N to 48°27'N, and east of 20°W from 7°N to 6°S, including the Straits of Gibraltar - The Mediterranean and Black Seas, east of the Straits of Gibraltar
METAREA IV	United States - North-West	United States - North-West	The western part of the North Atlantic Ocean eastwards of the North American coast to 35°W, from 7°N to 67°N, including the Gulf of Mexico and Caribbean Sea. Hudson Bay portion now produced by Environment Canada
METAREA V	Brazil	Brazil	Atlantic waters west of 20°W from 35°50'S to 7°N, narrowing in the coastal strips at the extremities to the Uruguay/Brazil frontier in 33°45'S and the French Guiana/Brazil frontier in 4°30'N
METAREA VI	Argentina	Argentina	The South Atlantic and Southern Oceans south of 35°50'S, from 20°W to the longitude of Cape Horn, 67°16'W
METAREA VII	METAREA VII west of 20°E - South Africa - eastern Atlantic Ocean region, METAREA VII east of 20°E - South Africa (2) - Indian Ocean region		The South Atlantic and Southern Oceans south of 6°S from 20°W to the coast of Africa, then south to the Cape of Good Hope; the South Indian and Southern Oceans south of 10°30'S from the Cape to 55°E, then south of 30°S to 80°E
METAREA VIII	India (North of the Equator) and Mauritius/Réunion (via France) (south of the Equator)	India (North of the Equator) and Réunion (via France) (south of the Equator)	For the north of the equator forecasts, the area of the Indian Ocean enclosed by lines from the Indo-Pakistan frontier at 23°45'N 68°E to 12°N 63°E, then to Cape Guardafui; the east African coast south to the Equator, then to 95°E, to 6°N, then northeastwards to the Myanmar/Thailand frontier at 10°N 98°30'E. For the south of the equator forecasts, the East African coast from the equator south to 10°30'S, then to 55°E, to 30°S, to 95°E, to the Equator, to the east African coast
METAREA IX	Pakistan	Pakistan	The Red Sea, Gulf of Aden, Arabian Sea and Persian Gulf, north of METAREA VIII
METAREA X		Pacific Ocean region - Australia, Fiji, New Zealand, Indian Ocean region - Australia, Mauritius/Réunion	The South Indian and Southern Oceans east of 80°E and south of 30°S to 95°E, to 12°S, to 127°E; then the Timor Sea, South Pacific and Southern Oceans south of 10°S to 141°E to the equator, to 170°E, to 29°S, then southwestwards to 45°S 160°E, then the 160°E meridian
METAREA XI	Indian Ocean portion - China, Pacific Ocean portion - Japan (however, scheduled bulletins and warnings for south of the equator are prepared by Australia)	Indian Ocean portion - China, Pacific Ocean portion - Australia (south of the equator)	North Western Pacific: The Indian Ocean, China Seas and North Pacific Ocean northward of METAREA X and on the equator to longitude 180°, eastward of METAREA VIII and the Asian continent to the North Korea/Russian Federation frontier at 42°30'N 130°E, then to 135°E, northeastwards to 45°N 138°E, to 45°N 180°
METAREA XII	United States	United States	The eastern part of the Pacific Ocean, west of the North and South American coast and east of 120°W, from 3°24'S to the equator, then to 180°, to 50°N then northwestwards to 53°N 172°E, northeastwards following the marine frontier between United States and Russian Federation waters to 67°N
METAREA XIII	Russian Federation		Sea areas enclosed north of METAREA XI and west of METAREA XII; also all Arctic waters from 170°W westwards to 20°E
METAREA XIV	New Zealand	Fiji (for area north of latitude 25°S)	The South Pacific and Southern Oceans south of the equator, bounded by METAREA X to the west, the equator to the north and 120°W to the east
METAREA XV	Chile	Chile	The South Pacific and Southern Oceans south of 18°21'S following the coast of Chile to the longitude of Cape Horn at 67°16'W, and 120°W
METAREA XVI	Peru	Peru	The South Pacific Ocean between 18°21'S and 3°24'S bounded by the coast of Peru and 120°W
METAREA XVII	Canada	Canada Note: the United States issues marine forecasts for its jurisdictional coastal and offshore waters north of Alaska	The Arctic Ocean bounded by 67°00'N 168°58'W, 90°00'N 168°58'W, 90°00'N 120°00'W, to south to the Canadian coastline along the 120°W meridian. The Arctic Ocean from south-west corner 67°00'N 44°00'E to north-east corner 80°00'N 165°00'W
METAREA XVIII	Canada	Canada and Denmark	The Arctic Ocean, bounded by a position on the Canadian coastline at the 120°W meridian to 90°N 120°W, 90°N 35°W, 67°N 35°W
METAREA XIX	Norway	Norway	The Arctic Ocean from a position on the Norwegian coastline at 65°N to 65°N 5°W, 75°N 5°W, West to a position on the Greenland coastline. From the border between Norway and Russia (Inland) to: 69°47'68"N 30°49'16"E, 69°58'48"N 31°06'24"E, 70°22'00"N 31°43'00"E, 71°00'00"N 30°00'00"E. From this geographical position, farther north along the 30°00'00"E meridian to: 90°00'00"N 30°00'00"E, 90°00'00"N 35°00'00"W, South to the Greenland coastline along the 35°00'00W meridian.
METAREA XX	Russian Federation		The Arctic Ocean from the border between Norway and Russia (Inland) to: 69°47'68"N 30°49'16"E, 69°58'48"N 031°06'24"E, 70°22'00"N 031°43'00"E, 71°00'00"N 030°00'00"E. From this geographical position, further north along the 30°00'00"E meridian to: 90°00'00"N 30°00'00"E, 90°00'00"N 125°00'00"E, then south to the Russian Federation coastline along the 125°00'00"E meridian
METAREA XXI	Russian Federation	Russian Federation	The Arctic Ocean from a geographical position on the Russian Federation coastline at the 125°E meridian to: 90°00'00"N 125°00'00"E, 90°00'00"N 168°58'00"W, 67°00'00"N 168°58'00"W, West to a geographical position on the Russian Federation coastline along the 67°N parallel
