= List of South American tornadoes in 2026 =

South American tornadoes of 2026
- Violent vegetation damage caused by an F4 tornado in Piraí do Sul, Brazil.
- Timespan: January 1 - Present
- Maximum rated tornado: F4 tornado: Giruá, Brazil on July 28; Piraí do Sul, Brazil on August 8 (Note: Rated F3 by SIMEPAR)
- Tornadoes: ~124
- Fatalities: 4 (22 injuries)

The 2026 South American tornado season is the current season of tornadoes and tornado outbreaks across South America in 2026. As of November, there have been approximately 124 confirmed tornadoes across Brazil & South America according to PREVOTS, with four fatalities and twenty-two injuries.

Confirmed tornadoes by Fujita rating
FU	F0	F1	F2	F3	F4	F5	Total
10	9	13	7	2	2	0	124

- Note: 47 tornadoes have been confirmed but are not yet rated.
- Note: Some tornadoes may be rated using different scales. They are counted as their closest F-Scale equivalent on this table.

Note that most tornadoes in South America are rated using the Fujita scale due to simplicity of application and the lack of relying in a single build code like the EF-scale which is more focused on the american build code, involving frame houses, mobile homes, and many more. Although, some tornadoes are unofficially or independently rated with the Enhanced Fujita scale using specific damage indicators, however, most damage indicators doesn't apply to building codes used in South America, PREVOTS stated multiple times an urge to adapt the Enhanced Fujita scale to Brazil's standards. The only country to formally use the EF-scale is Chile, while others being used unofficially or being from independent analyses.

== Climatology ==
Similar to North America or Europe, South America also experiences a few tornadoes per year, Brazil being one of the countries with the highest incidence of tornadoes outside the regions traditionally known for such phenomena. According to a survey by the State University of Ponta Grossa (UEPG), between 1975 and 2018, a total of 581 tornadoes were recorded in the country, 411 of which occurred in the Southern Region, accounting for approximately 70% of all cases. In 2018, the PREVOTS platform was established to document severe weather events across Brazil. Upon completing five years of operation, a report indicated that between June 2018 and June 2023, 321 damage incidents caused by tornadoes were recorded, including waterspouts. Most tornadoes in Brazil are associated with high-precipitation supercells, resulting in rain-wrapped tornadoes that are difficult to see. The annual average number of tornadoes in Brazil remains uncertain due to the country's less robust meteorological infrastructure compared to nations like the United States or Canada, and because of the low population density in the most tornado-prone areas. These factors contribute to underreporting, with many tornadoes being identified only months or even years after they occur. Recent estimates suggest a plausible average of 50 to 60 tornadoes per year, although this figure lacks official confirmation due to the aforementioned limitations.

== January ==
Confirmed tornadoes by Fujita rating
FU	F0	F1	F2	F3	F4	F5	Total
7	2	1	1	0	0	0	10

- Note: Some tornadoes may be rated using different scales. They are counted as their closest F-Scale equivalent on this table.

=== January 1 ===
List of confirmed tornadoes - Thursday, January 1 2026 (Note: All dates are based on the local time zone where the tornado touched down; however, all times are in Coordinated Universal Time for consistency.)
F#	Location	Country	Start coord.	Time (UTC-3)	Path length	Max width
FU	Carmen del Paraná	PY	Unknown	10:55	Unknown	Unknown
A brief waterspout was documented by local residents crossing the Rio Paraná.
F1	Mercedes, Paraná	BR	Unknown	Unknown	Unknown	Unknown
A small tornado touched down at night on rural areas of Mercedes and caused minimal damages to structures before dissipating, rated as F1 by Simepar.

=== January 4 ===
List of confirmed tornadoes - Sunday, January 4 2026
F#	Location	Country	Start coord.	Time (UTC-3)	Path length	Max width
FU	Paraty, Rio de Janeiro	BR	Unknown	Unknown	Unknown	Unknown
A short-lived waterspout was documented by residents in Paraty beach, before moving into the street nearby, dissipating shortly after. No damage was documented and the phenomenon only lasted two minutes.

=== January 9 ===
List of confirmed tornadoes - Friday, January 9 2026
F#	Location	Country	Start coord.	Time (UTC-3)	Path length	Max width
FU	Córdoba, La Cumbrecita	AR	Unknown	Unknown	Unknown	Unknown
A rare tornado formed on the mountains of Córdoba province and continued moving through the mountains, dissipating moments later.

=== January 10 ===
List of confirmed tornadoes - Saturday, January 10 2026
F#	Location	Country	Start coord.	Time (UTC-3)	Path length	Max width
F2	São José dos Pinhais, Paraná	BR	Unknown	~17:00 (Note: Various sources estimate the formation of this tornado between 17:00 to 18:00 in local time)	1 km	50m
A tornado was documented by local residents and recorded on video, later being confirmed and rated as F2 by Simepar, affecting 350 homes and causing two injuries. Considered by Metsul as a rare occurrence, due to it affecting a city instead of a community.
FU	São Francisco do Sul, Santa Catarina	BR	Unknown	Unknown	Unknown	Unknown
Local residents witnessed a waterspout, no damage was reported, confirmed by MetSul Meteorologia.

=== January 12 ===
List of confirmed tornadoes - Monday, January 12 2026
F#	Location	Country	Start coord.	Time (UTC-3)	Path length	Max width
FU	Rio Preto, Santa Catarina	BR	Unknown	Unknown	Unknown	Unknown
A brief tornado witnessed by local residents, no damage was reported, confirmed by MetSul Meteorologia.
F0	Felipe Schmidt, Canoinhas, Santa Catarina	BR	Unknown	Unknown	Unknown	Unknown
This brief tornado was captured in camera traversing through rural areas, no damage was reported, rated F0 and confirmed by PREVOTS and Civil Defense.

=== January 29 ===
List of confirmed tornadoes - Thursday, January 29 2026
F#	Location	Country	Start coord.	Time (UTC-3)	Path length	Max width
FU	Palmares do Sul, Rio Grande do Sul	BR	Unknown	Unknown	Unknown	Unknown
A waterspout was documented and recorded by local residents in Solidão, Palmares do Sul. No damage was reported, confirmed by MetSul Meteorologia.
EF0	Camaquã, Rio Grande do Sul	BR	Unknown	Unknown	Unknown	Unknown
Another waterspout was documented and recorded by local residents in Camaquã. No damage was reported, rated EF0 by local news.
FU	Lagoa dos Patos, Rio Grande do Sul	BR	Unknown	Unknown	Unknown	Unknown
A final waterspout was documented and recorded by local residents in Palmares do Sul, being confirmed in Lagoa dos Patos. No damage was reported, also confirmed by MetSul Meteorologia.

== February ==
Confirmed tornadoes by Fujita rating
FU	F0	F1	F2	F3	F4	F5	Total
1	5	0	0	0	0	0	8

- Note: Two tornadoes have been confirmed but are not yet rated.
- Note: Some tornadoes may be rated using different scales. They are counted as their closest F-Scale equivalent on this table.

=== February 1 ===
List of confirmed tornadoes - Sunday, February 1, 2026 (Note: All dates are based on the local time zone where the tornado touched down; however, all times are in Coordinated Universal Time for consistency.)
F#	Location	Country	Start coord.	Time (UTC-3)	Path length	Max width
F0	Taubaté, São Paulo	BR	23.0381°S 45.5552°W	~20:30	0.45 km (0.28 mi)	50 m (55 yd)
A brief landspout caused damage to corrugated metal roofs, with most of the roofing being blown off. Power lines in the area also experienced electrical short circuits. The tornado was confirmed by Conexão GeoClima and PREVOTS.

=== February 7 ===
List of confirmed tornadoes - Saturday, January 7 2026
F#	Location	Country	Start coord.	Time (UTC-3)	Path length	Max width
F0	Foz do Iguaçu, W of Paraná	BR	Unknown	Unknown	Unknown	Unknown
A short-lived tornado was captured in security camera of a home in Foz do Iguaçu, causing minor damages to the roof of a small house nearby without injuries reported, confirmed and rated as F0 by Simepar.

=== February 8 ===
List of confirmed tornadoes - Sunday, February 8 2026
F#	Location	Country	Start coord.	Time (UTC-3)	Path length	Max width
EF0	Ourinhos, São Paulo	BR	Unknown	16:00	Unknown	Unknown
This tornado damaged the metal roof of a transportation company's building, partially tearing it off and lifting several metal roofing sheets. Rated EF0 by Tempo Ourinhos.

=== February 12 ===
List of confirmed tornadoes - Thursday, February 12 2026
F#	Location	Country	Start coord.	Time (UTC-3)	Path length	Max width
EF0	Pelotas, Rio Grande do Sul	BR	Unknown	10:45	Unknown	Unknown
A short-lived tornado was captured in video causing moderate damage to trees, cars and nearby houses. Rated EF0 by Federal University of Pelotas.
F0	Catalão, Goiás	BR	18.2661°S 47.8944°W	Unknown	Unknown	Unknown
A landspout caused damage to house roofs and power lines. some sources reported that it was rated F0.

=== February 15 ===
List of confirmed tornadoes - Monday, February 15 2026
F#	Location	Country	Start coord.	Time (UTC-3)	Path length	Max width
F?	Encruzilhada do Sul, Canguçu	BR	Unknown	18:35	Unknown	Unknown
A tornado was captured in video on rural areas of Encruzadilha, the tornado destroyed at least one home and destroyed soybean crops.

=== February 23 ===
List of confirmed tornadoes - Sunday, February 23 2026
F#	Location	Country	Start coord.	Time (UTC-3)	Path length	Max width
FU	Aconquija, Campo del Pucará	AR	Unknown	Unknown	Unknown	Unknown
A tornado was documented and recorded by local residents in rural areas, no damage nor injuries were reported.

=== February 28 ===
List of confirmed tornadoes - Saturday, February 28 2026
F#	Location	Country	Start coord.	Time (UTC-3)	Path length	Max width
F?	Jaburu, Ceará	BR	Unknown	Unknown	Unknown	Unknown
A brief 'ghostly' tornado was captured by local Storm Chasers in Ceará, causing minor damage to a greenhouse tissue and to protective screens.

== May ==
Confirmed tornadoes by Fujita rating
FU	F0	F1	F2	F3	F4	F5	Total
0	0	0	0	1	0	0	2

- Note: One tornado has been confirmed but is not yet rated.
- Note: Some tornadoes may be rated using different scales. They are counted as their closest F-Scale equivalent on this table.

=== May 6 ===
List of confirmed tornadoes - Thursday, May 6 2026
F#	Location	Country	Start coord.	Time (UTC-3)	Path length	Max width
IF3	Las Flores	AR	Unknown	Unknown	20 km (12 mi)	Unknown
A wedge tornado was captured by local residents traversing into rural areas of Las Flores, causing significant damage in the Harosteguy region, where a masonry house was completely destroyed, resulting in four injuries. Hardwood trees were severely debarked and a combine harvester was overturned. Rated E/F2 by local news, however, SAMHI (South American Meteorological Hazards and their Impacts Database) technical study rated the event as an IF3 on the International Fujita scale.

=== May 22 ===
List of confirmed tornadoes - Friday, May 22 2026
F#	Location	Country	Start coord.	Time (UTC-3)	Path length	Max width
F?	São Luís, Maranhão	BR	Unknown	14:50	Unknown	Unknown
A funnel cloud formed in São Luís and traversed through São Cristóvão and Tirirical neighborhood, unroofing homes and businesses and causing minor damage to houses and tents.

== June ==
Confirmed tornadoes by Fujita rating
FU	F0	F1	F2	F3	F4	F5	Total
1	0	4	1	0	0	0	24

=== June 11 ===
List of confirmed tornadoes - Thursday, June 11 2026
F#	Location	Country	Start coord.	Time (UTC-3)	Path length	Max width
F?	Bonito, Mato Grosso do Sul	BR	Unknown	Unknown	Unknown	Unknown
Catalogued and confirmed by PREVOTS.
F?	Japorã, Mato Grosso do Sul	BR	Unknown	Unknown	Unknown	Unknown
Catalogued and confirmed by PREVOTS.

=== June 12 ===
List of confirmed tornadoes - Friday, June 12 2026
F#	Location	Country	Start coord.	Time (UTC-3)	Path length	Max width
F?	Paraíso das Águas, Mato Grosso do Sul	BR	Unknown	Unknown	Unknown	Unknown
Catalogued and confirmed by PREVOTS.
F?	Jataí, Goiás	BR	Unknown	Unknown	Unknown	Unknown
Catalogued and confirmed by PREVOTS.

=== June 14 ===
List of confirmed tornadoes - Sunday, June 14 2026
F#	Location	Country	Start coord.	Time (UTC-3)	Path length	Max width
F?	Rio Verde, Goiás (1st tornado)	BR	Unknown	Unknown	Unknown	Unknown
Catalogued and confirmed by PREVOTS.
F?	Rio Verde, Goiás (2nd tornado)	BR	Unknown	Unknown	Unknown	Unknown
Another tornado from the same tornado family. Catalogued and confirmed by PREVOTS.
F?	Rio Verde, Goiás (3rd tornado)	BR	Unknown	Unknown	Unknown	Unknown
Another tornado from the same tornado family. Catalogued and confirmed by PREVOTS.
F?	Rio Verde, Goiás (4th tornado)	BR	Unknown	Unknown	Unknown	Unknown
Another tornado from the same tornado family. Catalogued and confirmed by PREVOTS.

=== June 28 ===
List of confirmed tornadoes - Sunday, June 28 2026
F#	Location	Country	Start coord.	Time (UTC-3)	Path length	Max width
F2	Reserva, Paraná	BR	Unknown	~23:00	Unknown	Unknown
This tornado occurred in the late hours of June 28th, 11 houses were damaged or partially destroyed, araucaria trees were damaged, snapped or lost their treetops. A signpost was thrown 150 m (160 yd). Confirmed and rated F2 by PREVOTS and Simepar.

=== June 29 ===
List of confirmed tornadoes - Monday, June 29 2026
F#	Location	Country	Start coord.	Time (UTC-3)	Path length	Max width
F1	Nova Cantu, Paraná	BR	Unknown	Unknown	Unknown	Unknown
Another tornado was documented, this tornado uprooted trees and caused roof damage to some houses. Confirmed and rated F1 by PREVOTS and Simepar.

=== June 30 ===
List of confirmed tornadoes - Tuesday, June 30 2026
F#	Location	Country	Start coord.	Time (UTC-3)	Path length	Max width
F?	Serranópolis do Iguaçu, Paraná	BR	Unknown	Unknown	Unknown	Unknown
Another tornado documented from the same outbreak. Catalogued and confirmed by PREVOTS.
F?	Matelândia, Paraná	BR	Unknown	Unknown	Unknown	Unknown
Another tornado documented from the same outbreak. Catalogued and confirmed by PREVOTS.
F?	Céu Azul, Paraná	BR	Unknown	Unknown	Unknown	Unknown
Another tornado documented from the same outbreak. Catalogued and confirmed by PREVOTS.
F?	Alto Piquiri, Paraná	BR	Unknown	Unknown	Unknown	Unknown
Another tornado documented from the same outbreak. Catalogued and confirmed by PREVOTS.
F?	Iracema do Oeste, Paraná	BR	Unknown	Unknown	Unknown	Unknown
Another tornado documented from the same outbreak. Catalogued and confirmed by PREVOTS.
F?	Catanduvas, Paraná	BR	Unknown	Unknown	Unknown	Unknown
Another tornado documented from the same outbreak. Catalogued and confirmed by PREVOTS.
F?	Roncador, Paraná	BR	Unknown	Unknown	Unknown	Unknown
Another tornado documented from the same outbreak. Catalogued and confirmed by PREVOTS.
F1	Laranjeiras do Sul, Paraná	BR	Unknown	Unknown	Unknown	Unknown
Another tornado documented from the same outbreak. Houses suffered roof damage, including a school which suffered intense roof damage, needing to suspend classes temporarily. Catalogued and rated F1 by PREVOTS and Simepar.
F1	Turvo, Paraná	BR	Unknown	Unknown	Unknown	Unknown
Another tornado documented from the same outbreak. This tornado was recorded while touching down by local residents, and trees were damaged. Catalogued and rated F1 by PREVOTS and Simepar.
FU	Inácio Martins, Cruz Machado, Paraná (1st tornado)	BR	Unknown	Unknown	Unknown	Unknown
Another tornado documented from the same outbreak. Filmed by local residents, no damage was reported resulting in no rating. Catalogued and confirmed by PREVOTS and Simepar.
F1	Inácio Martins, Paraná (2nd tornado)	BR	Unknown	Unknown	Unknown	Unknown
Another tornado documented from the same outbreak. Trees were downed by the tornado, also filmed by local residents. Catalogued and rated F1 by PREVOTS and Simepar.
F?	Itaiópolis, Santa Catarina (1st tornado)	BR	Unknown	Unknown	Unknown	Unknown
Another tornado documented from the same outbreak. A strawberry crop was destroyed, a shed was affected, houses suffered minor roof damage and a pine tree fell. Catalogued and confirmed by PREVOTS.
F?	Itaiópolis, Santa Catarina (2nd tornado)	BR	Unknown	Unknown	Unknown	Unknown
Another tornado documented from the same outbreak. Catalogued and confirmed by PREVOTS.
F?	Itaiópolis, Santa Catarina (3rd tornado)	BR	Unknown	Unknown	Unknown	Unknown
Another tornado documented from the same outbreak. Catalogued and confirmed by PREVOTS.

== July ==
Confirmed tornadoes by Fujita rating
FU	F0	F1	F2	F3	F4	F5	Total
0	0	1	0	0	1	0	3

- Note: Some tornadoes may be rated using different scales. They are counted as their closest F-Scale equivalent on this table.
- One tornado has been confirmed but not rated.

=== July 27 ===
List of confirmed tornadoes - Monday, July 27 2026
F#	Location	Country	Start coord.	Time (UTC-3)	Path length	Max width
EF1	Llollinco, Chillan Viejo, Ñuble	CL	Unknown	14:00	Unknown	Unknown
This tornado was caught in camera by multiple residents, the tornado damaged homes, caused power outages, and also trees were knocked down, two people were injured. Rated EF1 by multiple sources.

=== July 28 ===
List of confirmed tornadoes - Tuesday, July 28 2026
F#	Location	Country	Start coord.	Time (UTC-3)	Path length	Max width
F4	Giruá, Senador Salgado Filho, Sete de Setembro, Rio Grande do Sul	BR	28.028870°S 54.528144°W	18:30	14.5 km (9.0 mi)	900 m (980 yd)
This violent tornado was captured in camera by multiple residents, 18 houses were damaged or destroyed and seven people were hospitalized. The tornado was also followed by hailstorms. The tornado was preliminarily rated high-end F3 by MetSul Meteorologia and PREVOTS, However, PREVOTS later conducted an analysis of treefall damage at three forested locations. The first location exhibited damage consistent with EF4/F4 intensity, while the remaining two locations showed damage consistent with EF3/F3 intensity. Based on this analysis, the tornado was subsequently rated F4.

=== July 31 ===
List of confirmed tornadoes - Friday, July 31 2026
F#	Location	Country	Start coord.	Time (UTC-3)	Path length	Max width
F?	San Genaro, Bernardo de Irigoyen, Santa Fe	AR	32.2358°S 61.2251°W	Unknown	~9 km (5.6 mi)	1,000 m (1,100 yd)
This tornado tracked through primarily rural areas and damaged a daily farm, injuring one person. According to Rastros do Previsão Master, the tornado was rated F3.

== August ==
Confirmed tornadoes by Fujita rating
FU	F0	F1	F2	F3	F4	F5	Total
0	0	2	1	1	1	0	7

- Two tornadoes have been confirmed but not yet rated.

=== August 6 ===
List of confirmed tornadoes - Thursday, August 6 2026
F#	Location	Country	Start coord.	Time (UTC-3)	Path length	Max width
F3	Pedro Osório, Rio Grande do Sul	BR	31.936002°S 53.189421°W	~18:00	~34 km (21 mi)	600 m (660 yd)
This rare multi-vortex tornado caused significant damage to rural areas of Pedro Osório, causing damage to houses and warehouses. Large eucalyptus trees were uprooted and suffered severe damage. No one was injured or killed. This tornado was preliminarily rated F2 by MetSul based on visible damage, and F3 by PREVOTS based on structural and vegetation damage, also the Monte Carlos simulation was used.

=== August 8 ===
List of confirmed tornadoes - Saturday, August 8 2026
F#	Location	Country	Start coord.	Time (UTC-3)	Path length	Max width
F4	Piraí do Sul, Jaguariaíva, Paraná	BR	49.856320°S 24.485855°W	17:30	26.1 km (16.2 mi)	750 m (820 yd)
This violent tornado destroyed several houses, including a mixed construction that was completely destroyed, with the rebar twisted. This tornado also caused damage to vegetation, removing 10–30 cm (0.33–0.98 ft) of soil from an area measuring 127–188 m² (1,370–2,020 sq ft). Various hardwood trees suffered damage to their treetops and occasionally, 60% of tree trunks were completely debarked or sandpapered. Rated preliminary as an F3 by Simepar, however, PREVOTS rated the event as an F4 with winds of at least 380 km/h (236 mph).
F2	Candói, Castro, Paraná	BR		Unknown	17 km (11 mi)	150 m (160 yd)
This second tornado caused damage to 8 houses, including partial damage to a warehouse and roof damage to a house. Rated low-end F2 by PREVOTS.
F1	Pinhão, Guarapuava, Paraná	BR		Unknown	18.5 km (11.5 mi)	400 m (440 yd)
Another tornado was confirmed by PREVOTS, rated high-end F1.
F?	Nova Aurora, Palmital, Paraná	BR				
A fourth tornado was confirmed, but no rating was assigned, this tornado is still being surveyed.

=== August 28 ===
List of confirmed tornadoes - Friday, August 28, 2026
F#	Location	Country	Start coord.	Time (UTC-3)	Path length	Max width
EF1	Yungay, Tucapel, Ñuble	CL	37.0544°S 72.1872°W	~23:00	36 km (22 mi)	Unknown
A nocturnal tornado caused damage to homes in the area, with one house reportedly swept off its foundation, leaving only the concrete slab. Numerous trees in the area were also uprooted. rated EF1 by The Dirección Meteorológica de Chile (DMC).

=== August 30 ===
List of confirmed tornadoes - Sunday, August 30 2026
F#	Location	Country	Start coord.	Time (UTC-3)	Path length	Max width
F?	Campo Erê, Santa Catarina	BR	Unknown	~19:25	Unknown	Unknown
A nocturnal wedge tornado was caught on a livestream by storm chasers. This tornado caused only minor damage to trees and damaged 35 houses, it was confirmed by Civil Defense.

== September ==
Confirmed tornadoes by Fujita rating
FU	F0	F1	F2	F3	F4	F5	Total
0	1	2	1	0	0	0	17

- Note: Some tornadoes may be rated using different scales. They are counted as their closest F-Scale equivalent on this table.
- Five tornadoes have been confirmed but not yet rated.

=== September 9 ===
List of confirmed tornadoes - Wednesday, September 9 2026
F#	Location	Country	Start coord.	Time (UTC-3)	Path length	Max width
F?	Franscisco Alves, Paraná	BR	Unknown	~17:00	Unknown	Unknown
Brief tornado confirmed by Simepar, no damage was reported.

=== September 10 ===
List of confirmed tornadoes - Thursday, September 10 2026
F#	Location	Country	Start coord.	Time (UTC-3)	Path length	Max width
F?	Espigão Alto do Iguaçu, Paraná	BR	Unknown	~00:40	Unknown	Unknown
Another tornado was confirmed by Simepar, this tornado destroyed several eucalyptus trees and two schools suffered roof damage.

=== September 11 ===
List of confirmed tornadoes - Friday, September 11 2026
F#	Location	Country	Start coord.	Time (UTC-3)	Path length	Max width
F?	Goioerê, Paraná	BR	Unknown	~16:00	Unknown	Unknown
Brief rope tornado captured in video by residents, no damage has been confirmed.
F?	San Pedro, Misiones	AR	Unknown	Unknown	23 km (14 mi)	1,600 m (0.99 mi)
1 death – A wooden house was completely destroyed, trees suffered some damage and one man died after his house collapsed.

=== September 20 ===
List of confirmed tornadoes - Sunday, September 20 2026
F#	Location	Country	Start coord.	Time (UTC-3)	Path length	Max width
F1	Santa Margarida do Sul, Rio Grande do Sul	BR	Unknown	Unknown	Unknown	Unknown
Caused extensive damage to an eucalyptus forest, uprooting and snapping several trees. Catalogued and rated by PREVOTS. Rated between F0–F1.
EF0	Longaví, Maule	CL	36.0295°S 71.6463°W	20:50	3 km (1.9 mi)	Unknown
This tornado damaged several houses, with roofs being torn off. Trees were uprooted, while fences and electrical infrastructure were also damaged. Rated EF0 by the Dirección Meteorológica de Chile (DMC).

=== September 21 ===
List of confirmed tornadoes - Monday, September 21 2026
F#	Location	Country	Start coord.	Time (UTC-3)	Path length	Max width
F?	Francisco Beltrão, Paraná	BR	Unknown	Unknown	Unknown	Unknown
A nocturnal tornado was captured in security camera lifting a car, the same storm would cause roof damage to some houses and would also damage a church's pavilion.
F2	Pedras Altas, Rio Grande do Sul	BR	Unknown	Unknown	Unknown	Unknown
The only significant tornado of the September 21st outbreak, trees were damaged and some were uprooted. A shed suffered roof damage and metal sheets were blown away by the tornado. Catalogued and rated F2 by PREVOTS. At least 18 tornadoes were documented on this outbreak.
F1	Piratini, Rio Grande do Sul	BR	Unknown	Unknown	Unknown	Unknown
Trees were damaged or uprooted and power lines were bent by the tornado. Catalogued and rated between F0–F1 by PREVOTS. At least 18 tornadoes were documented on this outbreak.
F?	Pinheiro Machado, Rio Grande do Sul (1st tornado)	BR	Unknown	Unknown	Unknown	Unknown
Another tornado documented from the same outbreak. Catalogued and rated between F0–F1 by PREVOTS.
F?	Pinheiro Machado, Rio Grande do Sul (2nd tornado)	BR	Unknown	Unknown	Unknown	Unknown
Another tornado documented from the same outbreak. Catalogued and rated between F0–F1 by PREVOTS.
F?	Pinheiro Machado, Rio Grande do Sul (3rd tornado)	BR	Unknown	Unknown	Unknown	Unknown
Another tornado documented from the same outbreak. Catalogued and rated between F0–F1 by PREVOTS.
F?	Pinheiro Machado, Rio Grande do Sul (4th tornado)	BR	Unknown	Unknown	Unknown	Unknown
Another tornado documented from the same outbreak. Catalogued and rated between F0–F1 by PREVOTS.
F?	Pinheiro Machado, Rio Grande do Sul (5th tornado)	BR	Unknown	Unknown	Unknown	Unknown
Another tornado documented from the same outbreak. Catalogued and rated between F0–F1 by PREVOTS.
F?	Pinheiro Machado, Rio Grande do Sul (6th tornado)	BR	Unknown	Unknown	Unknown	Unknown
Another tornado documented from the same outbreak. Catalogued and rated between F0–F1 by PREVOTS.
F?	Pinheiro Machado, Rio Grande do Sul (7th tornado)	BR	Unknown	Unknown	Unknown	Unknown
Another tornado documented from the same outbreak. Catalogued and rated between F0–F1 by PREVOTS.
F?	Canguçu, Rio Grande do Sul	BR	Unknown	Unknown	Unknown	Unknown
Another tornado documented from the same outbreak. Catalogued and rated between F0–F1 by PREVOTS.
F?	Piratini, Cerrito, Rio Grande do Sul	BR	Unknown	Unknown	Unknown	Unknown
Another tornado documented from the same outbreak. Catalogued and rated between F0–F1 by PREVOTS.
F?	Rio Grande, Rio Grande do Sul	BR	Unknown	Unknown	Unknown	Unknown
Another tornado documented from the same outbreak. Catalogued and rated between F0–F1 by PREVOTS.
F?	Pelotas, Rio Grande do Sul (1st tornado)	BR	Unknown	Unknown	Unknown	Unknown
1 death – This first tornado impacted Pelotas in the Simões Lopes neighborhood. Houses suffered roof damage, another house had one of its walls collapsed. Trees were snapped or uprooted, and power lines collapsed. Catalogued and rated between F0–F1 by PREVOTS.
F1	Pelotas, Rio Grande do Sul (2nd tornado)	BR	Unknown	Unknown	Unknown	Unknown
This second tornado impacted Pelotas in the town of Passos dos Negros, in the Navegantes neighborhood, two houses were destroyed and a truck was toppled by the tornado. Catalogued and rated F1 by PREVOTS.

== October ==
Confirmed tornadoes by Fujita rating
FU	F0	F1	F2	F3	F4	F5	Total
0	1	1	1	0	0	0	4

- Note: Some tornadoes may be rated using different scales. They are counted as their closest F-Scale equivalent on this table.

=== October 3 ===
List of confirmed tornadoes - Sunday, October 3, 2026
F#	Location	Country	Start coord.	Time (UTC-3)	Path length	Max width
F?	Capiatá, Central	PY	Unknown	19:30	Unknown	Unknown
This tornado damaged house roofs, power poles and trees. confirmed by Dirección de Meteorología e Hidrología (DMH).

=== October 13 ===
List of confirmed tornadoes - Saturday, October 13 2026
F#	Location	Country	Start coord.	Time (UTC-3)	Path length	Max width
EF0	Estación Central, Santiago	CL	33.4680°S 70.6705°W	16:30	Unknown	Unknown
This tornado caused damage to parts of the Terminal Sur roof, which were torn off and blown away. Roofing materials and some objects were lifted off the ground, while building roofs and tree branches were also damaged. Rated preliminary EF0 by The Dirección Meteorológica de Chile (DMC).

=== October 21 ===
List of confirmed tornadoes - Wednesday, October 21 2026
F#	Location	Country	Start coord.	Time (UTC-3)	Path length	Max width
EF1	Retiro, Maule	CL	Unknown	~14:07	Unknown	Unknown
This tornado was recorded on camera, 10 houses suffered minor damage, trees were damaged or uprooted, and power poles were knocked. No one was injured. Previously rated EF0 preliminary by Dirección Meteorológica de Chile (DMC), however, under newer analyses, the tornado was upgraded to an EF1 on the Enhanced Fujita scale.

=== October 26 ===
List of confirmed tornadoes - Monday, October 26 2026
F#	Location	Country	Start coord.	Time (UTC-3)	Path length	Max width
EF2	Requínoa, O’Higgins	CL	34.285800°S 70.824361°W	~17:20	3.1 km (1.9 mi)	181 m (198 yd)
This seemingly anticyclonic tornado impacted the outskirts of the Requínoa city, where the Tricahue school suffered severe damage, with the gymnasium completely destroyed, power poles were knocked and 70 houses suffered damage. One injury was reported. Rated preliminary EF2 by Dirección Meteorológica de Chile (DMC) and travelled approximately 3.1 km (1.9 miles).

== November ==
Confirmed tornadoes by Fujita rating
FU	F0	F1	F2	F3	F4	F5	Total
0	0	2	2	0	0	0	9

=== November 1 ===
List of confirmed tornadoes - Sunday, November 1 2026
F#	Location	Country	Start coord.	Time (UTC-3)	Path length	Max width
F2	Maringá, Paraná	BR	Unknown	Unknown	15 km (9.3 mi)	Unknown
This tornado knocked over trees, damaged several buildings’ roofs, snapped trees and power poles. Various factories were affected and at least 55 thousand homes were left without electricity. Confirmed and rated F2 by Simepar.

=== November 4 ===
List of confirmed tornadoes - Wednesday, November 4 2026
F#	Location	Country	Start coord.	Time (UTC-3)	Path length	Max width
F2	Guatambu, Chapecó, Santa Catarina	BR	27.1343°S 52.6525°W	10:30	16 km (9.9 mi)	Unknown
A rain-wrapped tornado struck the city of Chapecó, destroying several homes and damaging the local airport. Most of the aircraft hangars were destroyed, while most of the small aircraft sustained damage from the strong winds and flying debris. Four educational and healthcare facilities were also affected. Numerous trees were damaged or uprooted, with some falling onto roads in the area. A weather station operated by the National Institute of Meteorology (INMET) recorded wind gusts of approximately 126 km/h (78 mph). The tornado was rated preliminary F2 by multiple sources, including meteorologist Piter Scheuer.
F?	Xanxerê, Santa Catarina	BR	26.8759°S 52.4043°W	10:48	Unknown	Unknown
1 death – This tornado destroyed several homes and buildings in the area. Educational facilities were also affected. A truck was overturned, while numerous trees were debarked and snapped.
F?	Rio Negrinho, Santa Catarina	BR	Unknown	~13:30	Unknown	Unknown
1 death – This tornado damaged several houses in the area, with the tops of most trees snapped off and some trees debarked. The roof of a gas station collapsed, resulting in one fatality.

=== November 7 ===
List of confirmed tornadoes - Saturday, November 7 2026
F#	Location	Country	Start coord.	Time (UTC-3)	Path length	Max width
F?	Santo Augusto, Rio Grande do Sul	BR	27.8488°S 53.7764°W	01:18	Unknown	Unknown
A tornado damaged several homes, as well as commercial buildings, some of which sustained severe damage. Numerous trees were snapped or uprooted, and the electrical infrastructure was damaged, leaving some areas without power. One person was injured.
F?	Palmeira das Missões, Rio Grande do Sul	BR	Unknown	01:54	Unknown	Unknown
A tornado destroyed several homes, some of which were reduced to their foundations. A grain storage facility was also damaged and subsequently collapsed. Trees were debarked, while aerial imagery clearly revealed a damage path across the grass. One person was injured.

=== November 14 ===
List of confirmed tornadoes - Saturday, November 14 2026
F#	Location	Country	Start coord.	Time (UTC-3)	Path length	Max width
F?	San Javier, Santa Fe	AR	30.5771°S 59.9329°W	~20:00	Unknown	Unknown
A possible tornado destroyed a rice mill in the area, which sustained severe damage, with parts of the building completely collapsing. Roofing sheets and debris were scattered more than 500 m (1,640 ft) away. Numerous trees were knocked down, and electrical poles were also damaged. One family was forced to evacuate their home.

=== November 20 ===
List of confirmed tornadoes - Friday, November 20 2026
F#	Location	Country	Start coord.	Time (UTC-3)	Path length	Max width
F1	Ciudad del Este, Foz do Iguaçu, Paraná	PY, BR	Unknown	~15:00	Unknown	Unknown
A multi-vortex tornado caused damage to several homes in the area. Power poles were snapped and power lines were damaged, while numerous trees were uprooted and snapped. Rated F1 by Simepar.
F1	Manoel Ribas, Paraná	BR	Unknown	~18:00	Unknown	Unknown
A tornado damaged several homes, snapped numerous trees, and damaged power poles. Rated F1 by Simepar.

== See also ==
- Tornadoes of 2026
- Weather of 2026
- List of South American tornadoes and tornado outbreaks
- List of Brazil tornadoes
- Fujita scale
