= Parish Church of Piraí do Sul =

Catholic Church in Brazil

Coordinates: 24°31′59″S 49°56′01″W

- Igreja Matriz de Piraí do Sul
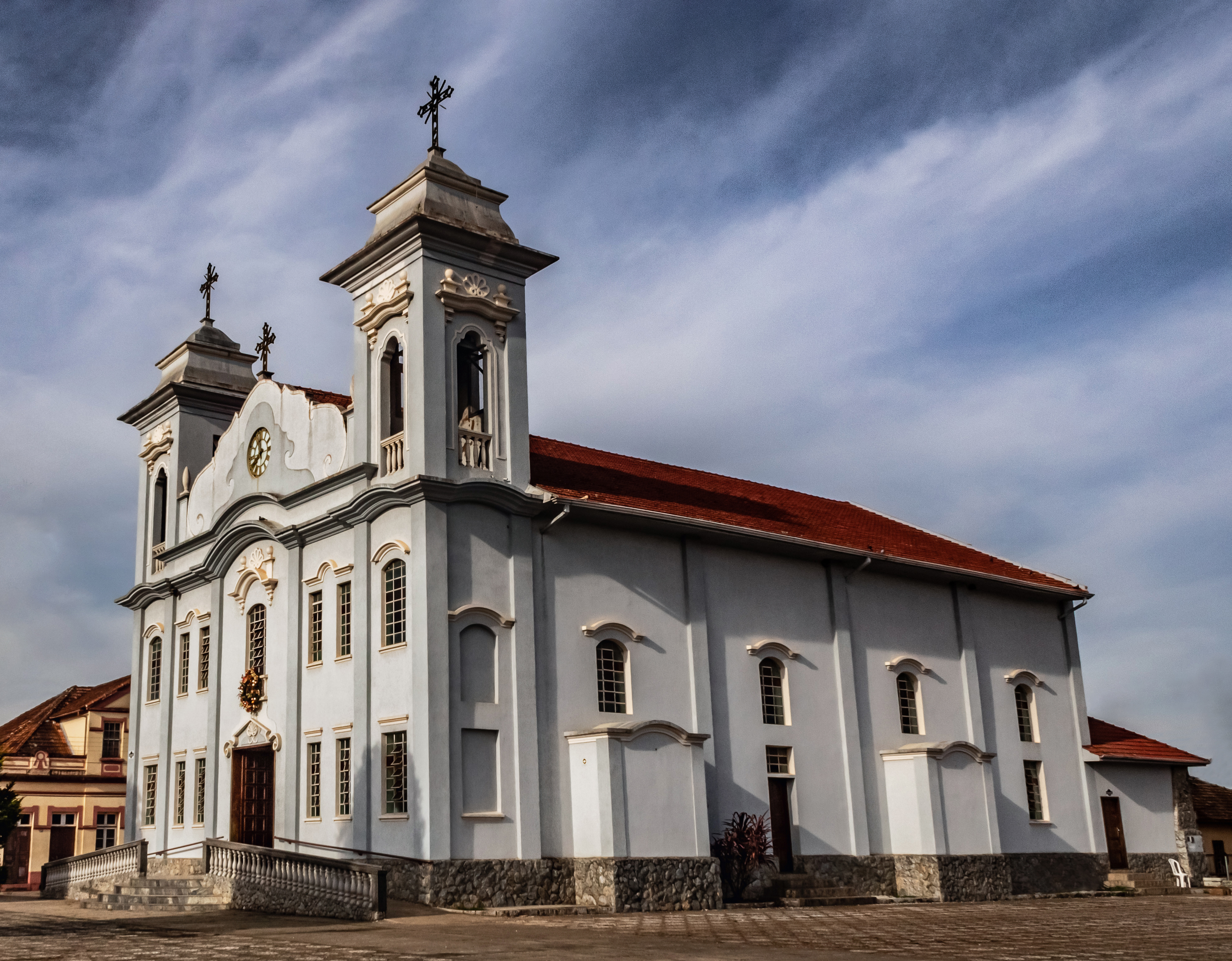
- View of the Parish Church of Piraí do Sul

Religion
- Affiliation: Catholic
- Ownership: Roman Catholic Diocese of Ponta Grossa

Location
- Location: Piraí do Sul. Paraná, Brazil
- Interactive map of Parish Church of Piraí do Sul

Architecture
- Architect: Unknown
- Established: 1859

The Parish Church of Christ Child or Parish Church of Piraí do Sul is a Catholic temple located in the Brazilian city of Piraí do Sul, in the state of Paraná. The city hosts the Parish of Christ Child, which is subordinated to the Diocese of Ponta Grossa. The church has an eclectic style and was built in 1859, ten years after permission to build was granted, and since then it has undergone numerous restorations. The temple was also the seat of the first City Council, because there was no proper place for meetings in Piraí do Sul when the community became a village. The Feast of Christ Child is held on Christmas time, with novenas, processions, Catholic religious celebrations and artistic presentations.

== History ==
=== Christ Child ===
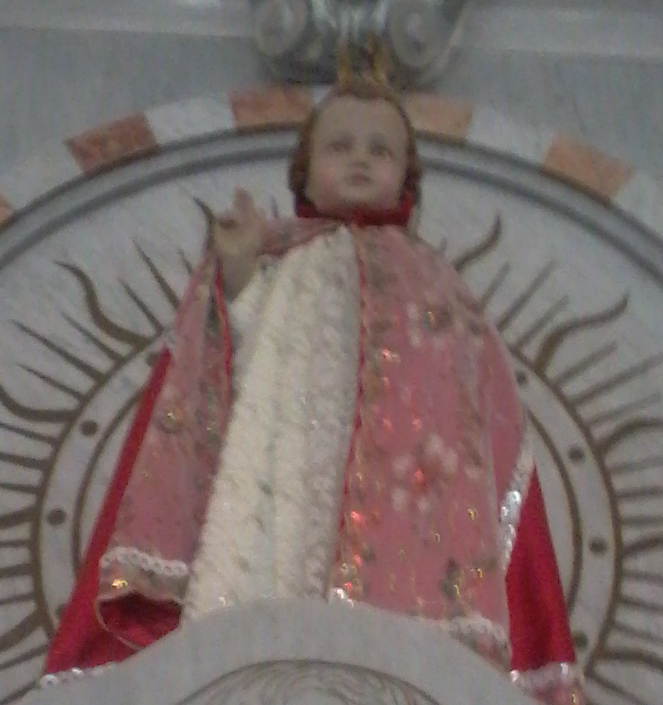
Image of the Christ Child at the altar of the Parish Church in Pirai do Sul.

The cult of the Christ Child was already practiced by Manoel da Rocha Carvalhais and his wife Josefa Rodrigues Coutinho in the region where the city of Piraí do Sul is currently located since the middle of the 18th century. They had an oratory next to their property, which became known as the oratory of the Christ Child of Piraí, where religious festivities were held, together with the other inhabitants of the area. After the death of Manoel and Josefa, Manoel da Costa Ferreira and Ana Mendes Tenória continued the religious activity and built a church in the place called Campo Comprido, under the invocation of Saint Anne.

After the death of Manoel da Costa Ferreira and Ana Mendes Tenória their property was inventoried and passed into the possession of several people, until it was bought by Lieutenant Bernardo Moreira Paes, on January 28, 1823, who took over the church. However, Bernando stopped holding the parties that were held in the chapel in Campo Comprido in honor of the Christ Child of Piraí.

In 1805, an image of the Christ Child was brought to the village by Bernardino Rodrigues de Almeida, who was a troop driver between Viamão, on the pampas of Rio Grande do Sul, and Sorocaba, in the Captaincy of São Paulo; at that time, the troopers periodically cut through the community using the historic Caminho das Tropas (English: Troop Path).

It is supposed that this image was found in a ruined church that belonged to a reduction owned by the Society of Jesus, located in Pelotas, which was destroyed by order of the Marquis of Pombal. This image was carved in brazilian rosewood, measured 51 cm had characteristics of Portuguese art, and there is a possibility that it was brought from Portugal. Bernardino settled down, set up a business house, and built a small chapel to host the image, made of wattle and daub and covered with sapê. Currently these buildings no longer exist and the Jorge Queiroz Netto State School was built on the site.

A new image of the Christ Child (61cm), enthroned on the main altar, was carved in wood by Artur Pederzon, a sculptor from São Paulo in 1955.

=== Preparation for construction of the chapel ===
In the beginning of the 19th century, the territory where the city of Piraí do Sul is now located had few inhabitants. Some of them were part of the City Council of Castro, and among them was Lieutenant Bernardo Moreira Paes, who acquired much of the land in the region. As most of his children were in Rio Grande do Sul, Bernardo sought support in religion and, as he had a good relationship with the neighboring residents, he invited them to build a chapel dedicated to the Christ Child, and formed a commission for this in 1845.

For this purpose, Bernardo bought the land from Pedro José Pinto and Bernardino Rodrigues de Almeida, making a construction permit request to the Diocesan Chancery of São Paulo. There were no dioceses in the territory of Paraná at that time, and the whole region belonged to the then Bishopric of São Paulo. It was up to the Diocesan Chancery of the Imperial City of Paulicéia the task to organize and install the parishes in Paraná, along with the decrees of the Civil Power. This permission was signed on May 11, 1849:

"Lourenço Justiniano Ferreira, Professor of the Order of Christ, Knight of the Order of the Rose, Chautré of the Cathedral of this imperial city of São Paulo, Delegate Major Chaplain of the Army, by His Imperial Majesty and Vicar of the Chapter by the Ilustríssimo. e Revmo. If there is sede vacante etc...etc...etc...etc...."

"To those who see this Provision. Health and Peace forever in the Lord. I hereby inform you that in response to your petition represented to me by the residents of the district called: A LANÇA - of the Term of the Village of Castro: I hereby grant you the faculty to found and build a Chapel with the Jurisdiction, I mean with the Invocation of the Child God: so long as it is in a decent place, high, free of humidity, as far away as possible from filthy and sordid places, and private houses: not being however in a deserted and unpopulated place, and that the said Chapel has an ambit around so that the Processions may walk, which place shall be marked by the Most Reverend Vicar of the respective Court. This will be registered in the Book of Records of the Parish for all time records and after it is finished Mass cannot be celebrated in it, without license, for which information will be given with my sign and seal and the Capitular Table. On May 10, 1849 and I, Father Maximimo José Correa da Silva, assistant clerk of the Chapter Council, signed it. Lourenço Justiniano Ferreira"

- Permission written with the spelling of the time

The signing of this permission brought moral and religious comfort to Bernardo Moreira Paes, who was going through family problems, such as the estrangement of his children and separation from his wife. Father Damaso José Correa, Vicar attached to the Parish Church of Castro, wrote the following observation in the Book of Records: "how beautiful, the more than twenty houses that will host the Church are all decorated, those who had nothing to show in front of them to draw attention hung cloths and the air is perfect joy. Bernardo's house is lit up every day with torches to thank for the Provision".

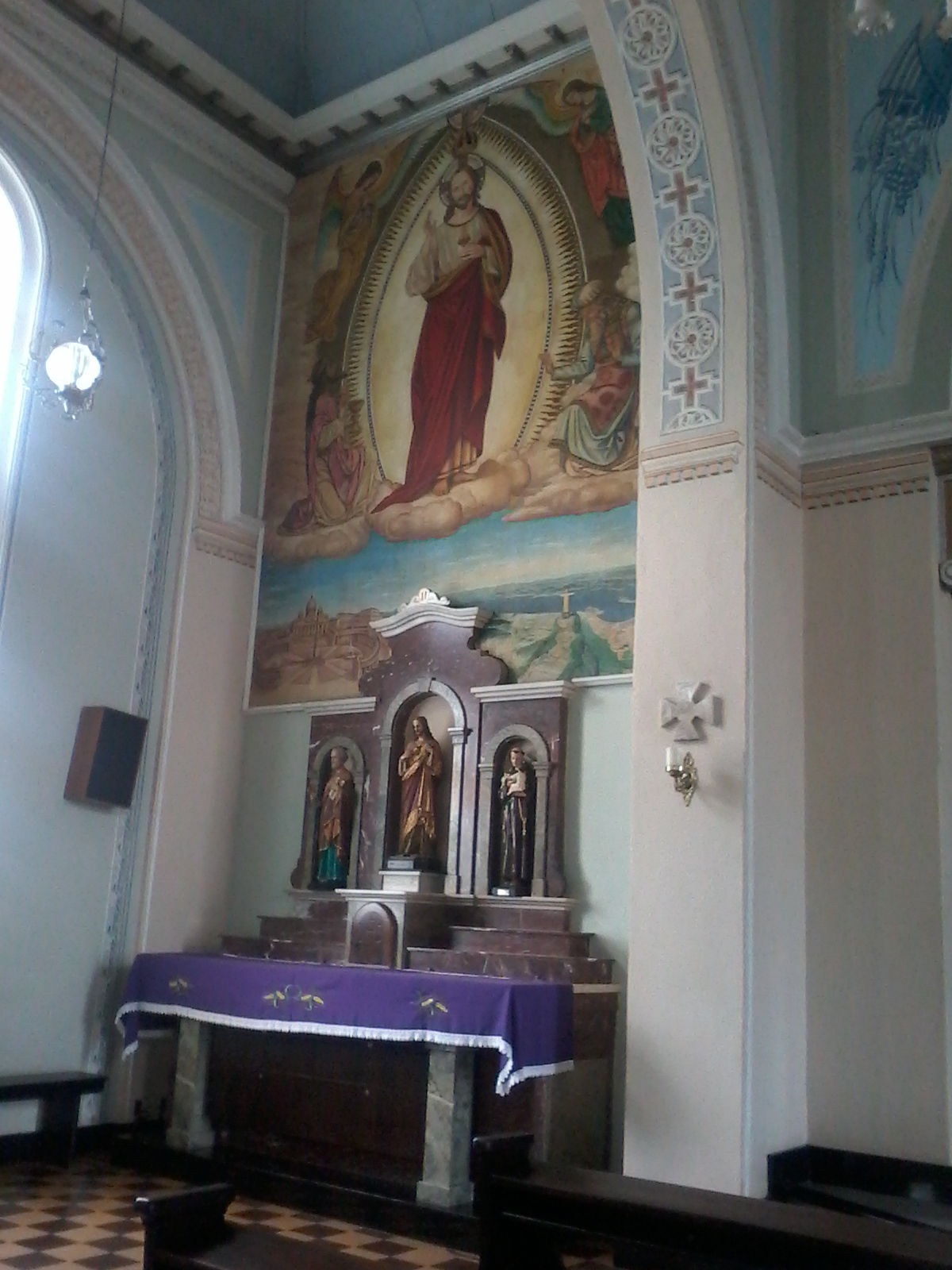
Left panel of the Parish Church of Piraí do Sul.

As soon as the news of the construction of the church was announced, predictions were made about the development of the region and of a future city, with Father Damaso coming to the site to confirm that the chapel would be built in: "a high and decent place, with a circle of people to walk in processions and from this the city will be born". It was commented in the City Council of Castro that the site "flows into the passage of the troops, the key point for all communications, the future seat of the district and future seat of the city of Piraí".

=== Construction and development ===
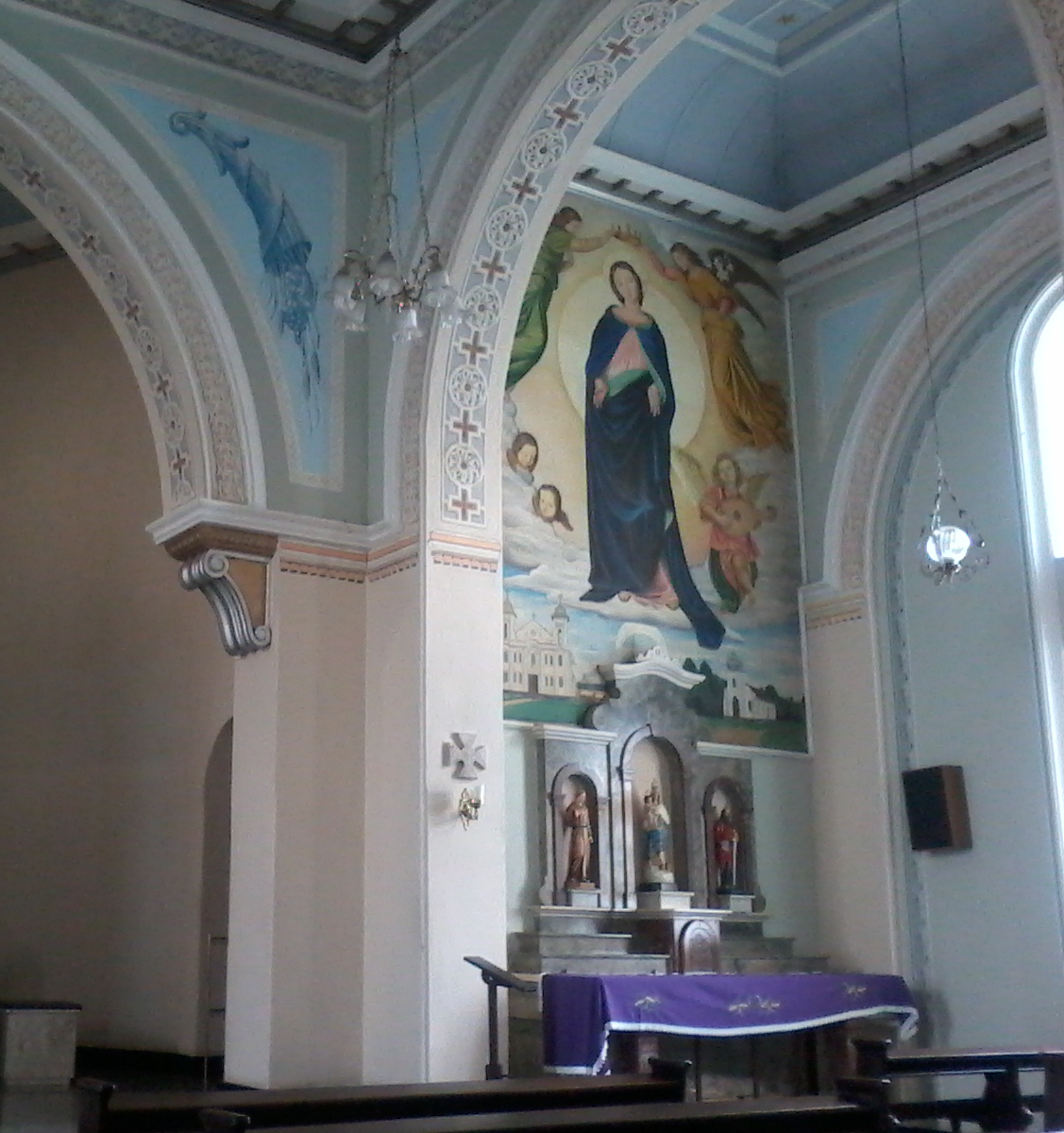
Right panel of the Parish Church of Piraí do Sul.

The local population came together for the construction of this chapel, which was supported by Father Damaso and urged by Friar Mathias de Genova, coadjutor bishop of the Parish of Castro, who also went around the neighborhoods begging for funds for the works. The chapel took 10 years to be completed, being built of stucco, wooden laths and mud plastered with simple architecture, no ceiling, no floor and a thatched roof. On February 4, 1859, Friar Mathias solemnly blessed the chapel, and on the same occasion, he upgraded it to the level of Curate. The image of the Christ Child of Bernardino Rodrigues de Almeida was housed in the new church, and on February 8, 1859, the donation of the land for the chapel was recorded in the notary's office of the city of Castro.

At the time the region was called Bairro da Lança. Later, on April 12, 1872, through provincial law 329, the community of Bairro da Lança was elevated to the category of parish, called Pirahy, under the invocation of the Christ Child, whose area belonged to the city of Castro, and was renamed Parish of Senhor Menino Deus de Pirahy. In the 1873 census, it was verified that the new parish had a population of 2,115 people, where many lived in very poor conditions. As a result, the Parish of Senhor Menino Deus de Pirahy was dependent for many decades on the Parish of Castro, since it was not possible for the region to have its own vicar. In the chronicle of the Book of Records it was registered: "The creation of this parish did not have as its origin the improvement of the spiritual state of the population, but was purely political". The Bishopric of São Paulo canonically established the Parish of Piraí do Sul.

Through provincial law No. 631, of March 5, 1881, the parish was elevated to the condition of village, at which time the Village Council was created, which was installed in the atrium of the Parish Church, as it had no place of its own for meetings. Therefore the church served for 10 years as the Council's building, where administrative matters were discussed. Due to pressure from the visiting priest Jose Juliani, who did not want the meetings to be held in the church, a new location for the Council was arranged.

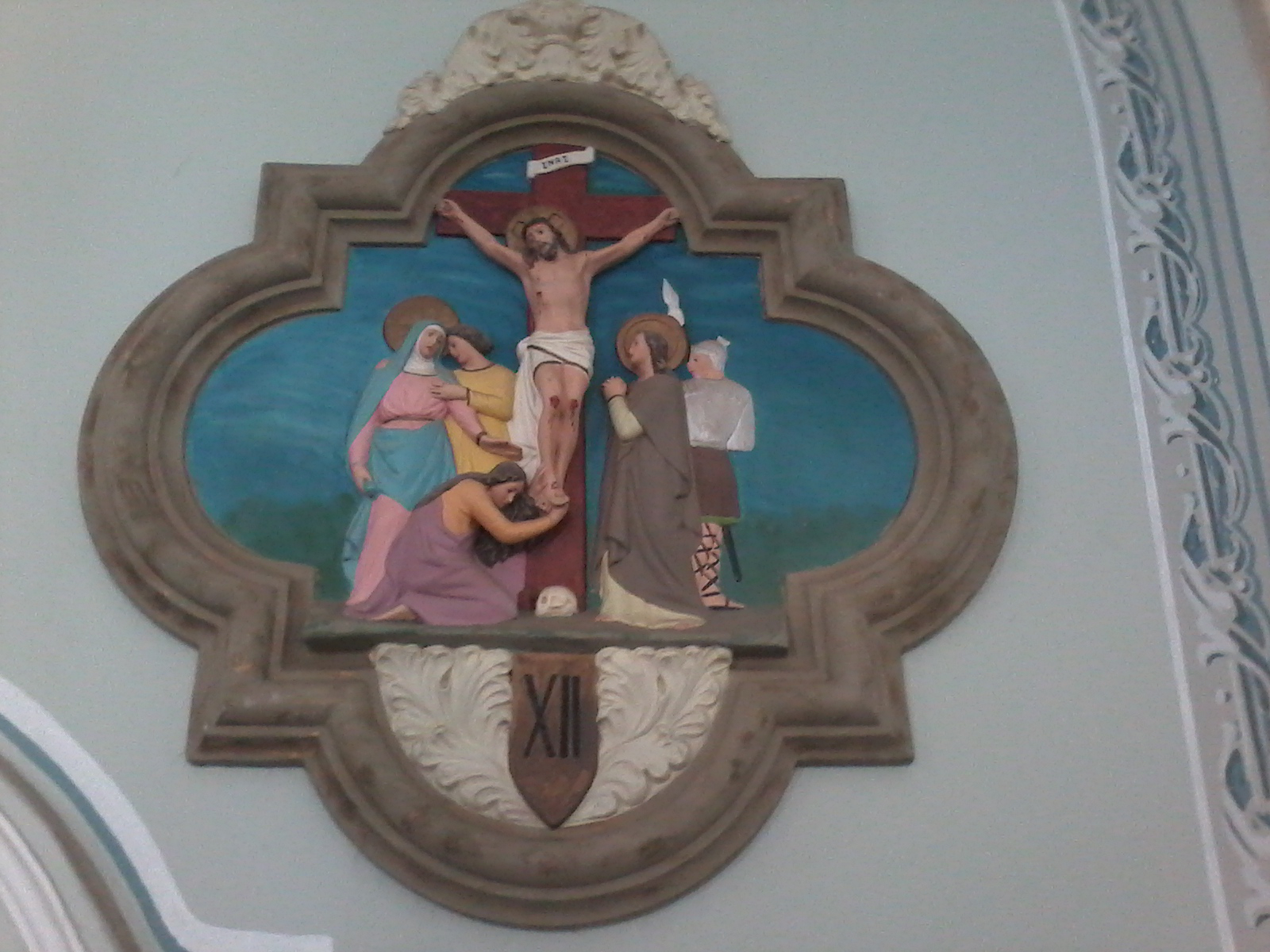
There are several high-reliefs about the crucifixion of Jesus on the walls of the church

In 1881, there was a change in the church, when, due to the insistence of Canon Sisenando da Cruz Dias, the presbytery was built, lined, floored, and made of bricks. Later, the new vicar, Father Casimiro Andrzejewski, described the church in 1897 as follows: "The church had the appearance of a neighborhood chapel. It was made of clay, leaned on the north side by two beams so it wouldn't fall over, covered with tiles without a lining and with many leaks that made the floor rot, becoming soft and elastic from old age. The presbytery was recently built, with little light, very low, as it is now". Subsequently in the same text the priest continues with notes on particular episodes about the people of the region. About the church, he continued with his memories, stating that: "The Church of the Christ Child idealized by Carvalhais centuries ago, trying to be built by Bernardo Paes, still suffered. Only later Father Ernesto Alberini by the 1920s, increased the lateral spaces, being followed still by his successor Father José Kramer that in the 1930s built the three naves and the Diocesan Bishop, when passing through Piraí do Sul, noted '...architectural defects in its interior hindering the altar'."

This period of poverty, where it was difficult to make improvements to the church, also impacted the lives of religious people. Father Casimiro reported that: "...my income in Piraí was often not even enough to cover the expenses of the trips, but the religious fervor of the people often imposes it". The inhabitants of the region tried to maintain the church, and in 1911 a complete renovation was done in the building, which was on the point of collapse, expanding its entrance. As the city's population grew, the Parish Church could not hold the number of believers, and there was the intention to build a new church, but during the management of Father Ernesto Alberini, vicar in the region from 1930 on, it was decided to expand the Parish Church, enlarging the size of the church and enlarging the part of the side altars and the presbytery. After Father Albertini's performance, the parish passed into the hands of Father José Kramer, who started a new reform. The building became larger, with three naves, and started to have the present two towers in the facade. Eight years later, the reform was being finished and Father Kramer performed the solemn blessing on the first day of the novena for Christmas 1946.

The building ended up having construction errors and, to correct them, a general renovation was started in 1957, having its interior painted by the artist Emilio Zanon. Inside, panels were also painted by Friar Narciso Pollmeier. Due to the population growth, the church started to have several branch chapels, but to improve the attendance to the catholic population, Father Guido Hussmann launched the project of building the Church of St. Joseph the Worker, because the Parish Church could not accommodate the growing population of Piraí do Sul. For its construction, the priest got the money through Caritas from Germany and the many parties created with the intention of raising money, besides the income generated by the Feast of Our Lady of Brotas.

== Culture ==
Since 1872, when the community became a village by an order of the president of the Province of Paraná, the Feast of Christ Child has been held, becoming one of the most traditional festivals in the region. The celebration takes place annually from December 16 to 25; novenas, processions, Catholic religious celebrations, and artistic presentations take place there. Like the Feast of Christ Child, the Feast of Our Lady of Brotas also takes place in December, on the 27th. Both festivities are held in honor of their patron saints and have their stories linked to tropeirismo. In addition, both events have the support of the State Secretary of Tourism and the program called Paraná Turismo.

Due to the proximity of the dates between the two festivities, the entire structure of the Feast of the Christ Child leaves the surroundings of the parish church and is set up around the Sanctuary of Our Lady of Brotas. Another important moment of the festivities is the procession that leaves the parish church, at 9 am on December 27, towards the sanctuary.

== Bibliography ==
- Hussmann, Guido (1964). A Paróquia do Senhor Menino Deus e o Santuário de Nossa Senhora das Brotas. Petrópolis: Editora Vozes Ltda.
- Milléo, Marcelo Zanello (2008). Fundação e Evolução de Piraí do Sul - PR. Curitiba: Juruá Editora.
