= Palmital =

Palmital may refer to the following places in Brazil:

- Palmital, Paraná
- Palmital, São Paulo

== See also ==
- Palmital River (disambiguation)
- Palmitas, Soriano Department, Uruguay
- Palmita, a synonym of the moth genus Hypotia
