= Cléber (footballer, born August 1982) =

Brazilian footballer

Personal information
- Full name: Cléber Luis Alberti
- Date of birth: August 20, 1982 (age 44)
- Place of birth: Palmital, Brazil
- Height: 1.84 m (6 ft 0 in)
- Position: Goalkeeper

Team information
- Current team: GD Estoril
- Number: 12

Youth career
- 1999–2000: SOREC-PR

Senior career*
Years	Team	Apps	(Gls)
2000–2007	Atlético-PR	71	(0)
2005	→ Santa Cruz (loan)		
2007–2010	Sport	1	(0)
2009–2010	→ Botafogo-SP (loan)		
2010–	GD Estoril	15	(0)
- * Club domestic league appearances and goals

Cléber Luis Alberti or simply Cléber (born August 20, 1982) is a goalkeeper player from Brazil, who plays for Portuguese Liga de Honra side GD Estoril.

He made his professional debut for Atlético-PR in a 0-0 draw at home to Goiás in the Campeonato Brasileiro on October 5, 2002.

== Honours ==
- Campeonato Paranaense in 2001 and 2002 with Atlético Paranaense
- Campeonato Pernambucano in 2005 with Santa Cruz Futebol Clube
- Campeonato Pernambucano in 2007 and 2008 with Sport Club do Recife
- Copa do Brasil in 2008 with Sport Club do Recife

== Contract ==
- 27 April 2007 to 30 April 2010
