= Andréia Suntaque =

Brazilian footballer (born 1977)

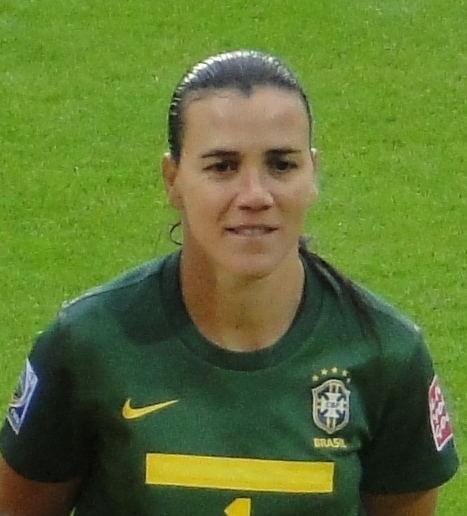

Personal information
- Date of birth: 14 September 1977 (age 49)
- Place of birth: Nova Cantu, Paraná, Brazil
- Height: 1.72 m (5 ft 8 in)
- Position: Goalkeeper

Senior career*
Years	Team	Apps	(Gls)
2003	CFF Puebla		
2005	Estudiantes de Huelva	13	(0)
2006–2008	Transportes Alcaine	50	(0)
2009–2013	Santos		
2013–2014	Portugesa		
2015	Tiradentes		

International career^{‡}
1999–2015	Brazil		
- * Club domestic league appearances and goals as of 18 November 2015 ‡ National team caps and goals as of 10 January 2008 16:47 UTC

Olympic medal record

Representing Brazil

Women's Football
Silver medal – second place	2004 Athens	Team competition
Silver medal – second place	2008 Beijing	Team competition

Andréia Suntaque (born 14 September 1977), often referred to as simply Andréia, is a Brazilian former footballer who played as a goalkeeper.

Andréia was in Brazil's squad at the 1999 FIFA Women's World Cup, when she was playing for São Paulo FC. She was a member of the Brazilian team that won the silver medal at the 2004 Summer Olympics and the 2008 Summer Olympics.

Andréia was a member of the Brazil Women's Squad at the 2003 FIFA Women's World Cup. The next year Brazil were the runner-up at the 2004 Summer Olympics. In 2007 Brazil were the runner-up in the 2007 FIFA Women's World Cup after losing 2–0 in the final to Germany. The next year in the 2008 Summer Olympics Andréia lost her starting spot to Barbara, because Barbara "Would give Brazil a better chance to claim "Their First Ever Major Title". But Brazil failed to capitalize, they lost the final 1–0 against the United States in Extra Time. After the Game Andréia and Barbara were seen hugging each other and lying on the ground crying. In 2011 the Brazil squad were ready to get in level terms on the world stage. They walked through their group winning all the games. They once again meet the USA squad in the Quarter Finals. In the second minute of the game a cross was sent in on the ground from Shannon Boxx, and then kicked into the Brazilian goal by a Brazilian defender Daiane. Marta went on to score twice to give Brazil the lead. Brazil thought they had a time management plan, but in the 122' minute USA midfielder Megan Rapinoe sent a ball into the Brazilian box. Andréia came way off her line missing the ball allowing US striker Abby Wambach to score the game tying header with just seconds left. The two teams went into a PK shoot out. On the first kick by Shannon Boxx, Andréia appeared to save the PK, but actually was many yards off her line. Boxx took another PK and slipped it right past Andréia. Then Carli Lloyd, Abby Wambach, Megan Rapinoe, and Ali Krieger scored their PK's to beat the Brazilian and send them out of the World Cup. In 2015 Andréia wasn't selected for the 2015 Women's World Cup Brazilian squad.
