= Castrolanda =

- Village and cooperative
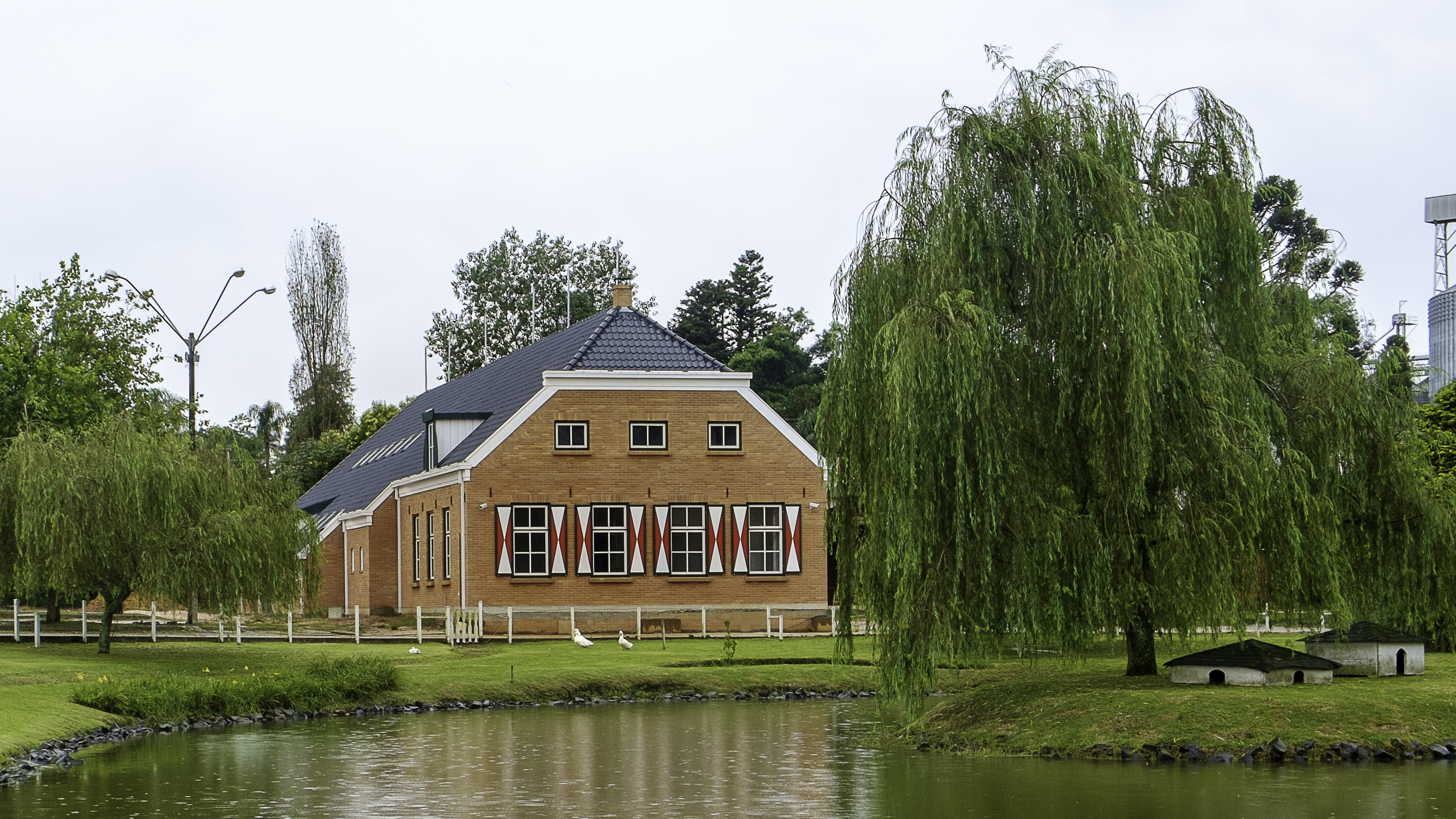
- The windmill of Castrolanda

- Location in Brazil Castrolanda (Brazil)
- Coordinates: 24.7932°S 49.9449°W
- Country: Brazil
- Region: Southern
- State: Paraná
- Municipality: Castro

Area
  - Total: 50 km^{2} (19 sq mi)

Population (2010)
  - Total: 355
  - Density: 7.1/km^{2} (18/sq mi)
- Time zone: UTC -3
- Area code: 42
- Website: castrolanda.coop.br

Castrolanda is a village and cooperative in the municipality of Castro in the Brazilian state of Paraná. Castrolanda is a colony that was founded by Dutch immigrants in November 1951.

== History ==
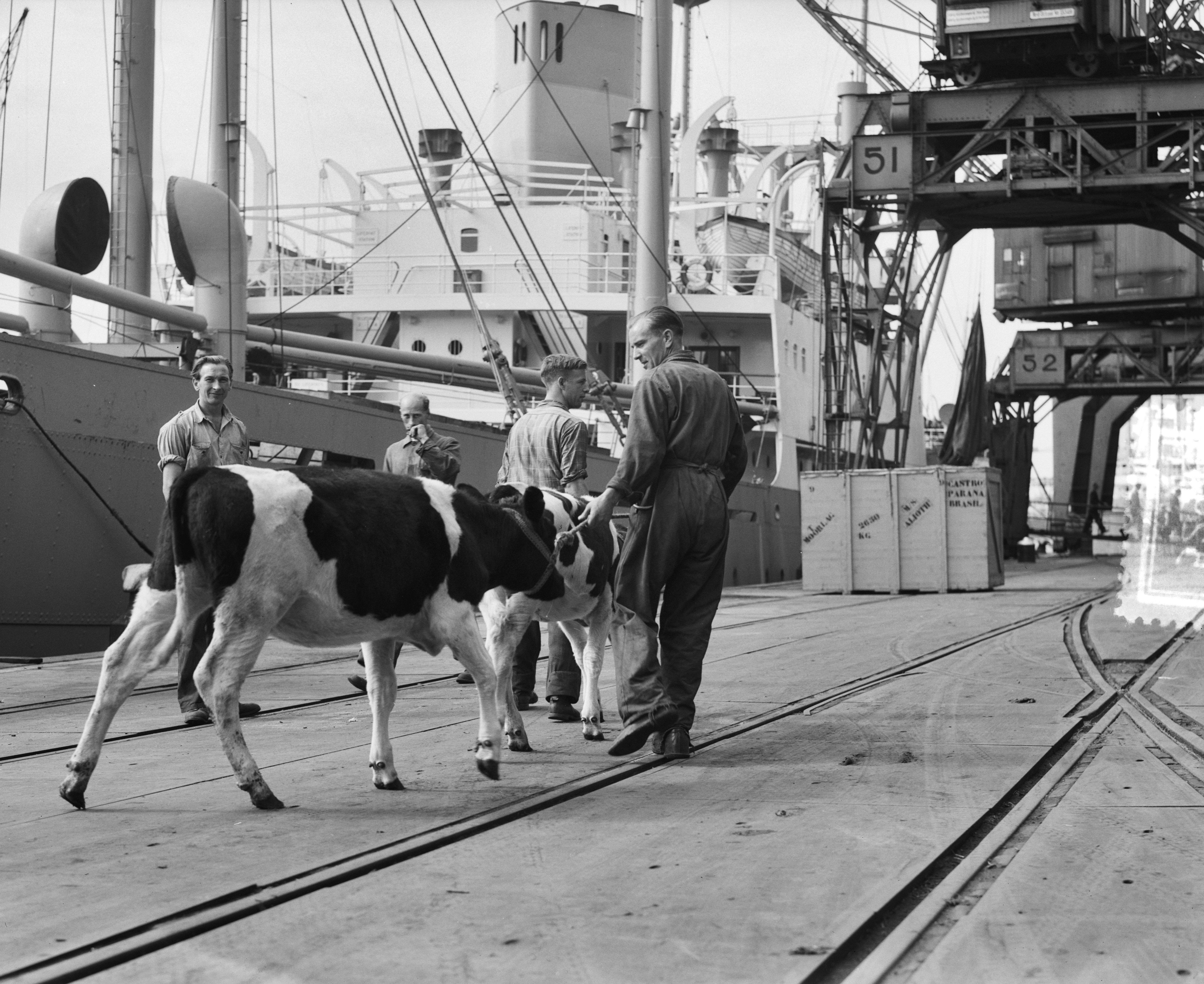
Cows are boarded for transport to Brazil

The Dutch colonists led by Jan de Jager, Geert Leffers and Feike Dijkstra acquired 5,000 hectares (12,000 acres) of land along the Iapó River from the city of Castro, and founded Castrolanda as an agriculture cooperative. In September 1952, 50 families and 61 cows boarded the MS Alioth in Rotterdam to establish a new colony in Brazil.

Castrolanda has a 26 metres high windmill which was built in 2001 at the 50th anniversary of the colony. It is modelled after the windmill in Woldzigt and is able to mill. It is not only a tourist attraction, but also serves as a community centre with a library. The village also has historical museum.

== Economy ==
The economy of Castrolanda is based on agricultural production and dairy farming. It is considered one of the largest dairies in Brazil. It has a considerable production of grain, mostly soy and beans. The cooperative is also owner of a dairy factory in Castro, and a factory in Piraí do Sul.

== See also ==
- Holambra
