= Our Lady of Brotas =

Catholic title dedicated to Mary, the mother of Jesus

- Venerated in: Catholic Church
- Shrine: Shrine of Our Lady of Brotas, Brotas, Portugal
- Patronage: Protector of sick animals
- Feast day: December 8 in Brotas, São Paulo

Our Lady of Brotas is a Catholic title dedicated to Mary, the mother of Jesus of Nazareth. The history of this title is very old, dating back several centuries. The devotion to Our Lady of Brotas began in Portugal, after Mary appeared to a shepherd. He received a grace, and Our Lady asked the inhabitants of Águias to build a chapel, which today is the Shrine of Our Lady of Brotas. The Shrine is located where Our Lady appeared. For centuries, it has been one of the main pilgrimage centers.

Initially, it was a humble chapel, but as news spread and the number of pilgrims increased, the shrine had to be enlarged. The Archbishop of Évora, later Cardinal Dom Afonso, the son of King D. Manoel, recognized that the shrine was an important place for pilgrims. He decided that the shrine was more significant than the parish church and thus suppressed the church, making the shrine the headquarters of the parish. The oldest image of Our Lady of Brotas dates back to the 16th century and is made of ivory.

== Expansion of the cult of Our Lady of Brotas ==
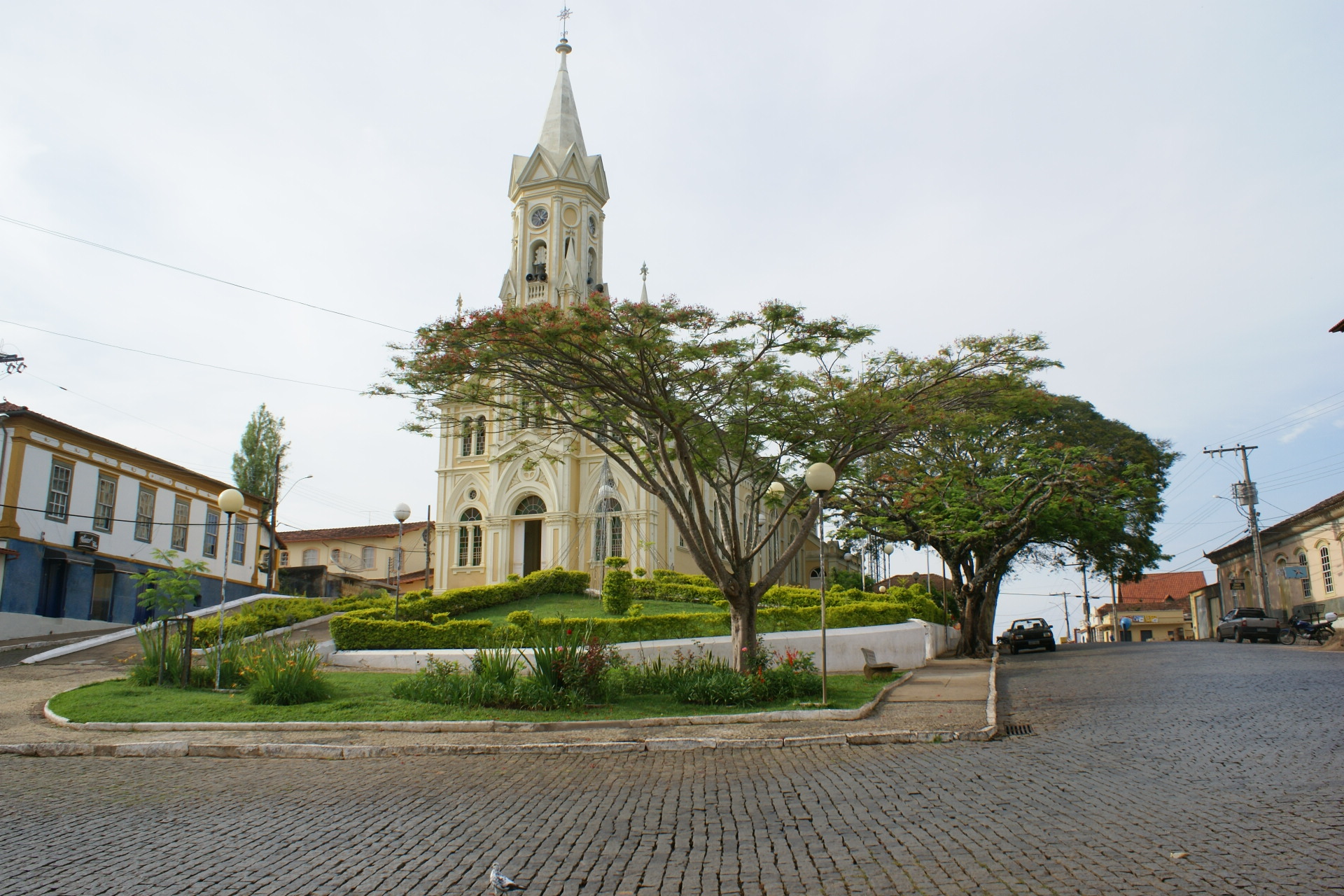
Mother Church of Our Lady of Brotas in Entre Rios de Minas.

Through the influence of Portugal, the devotion to Our Lady of Brotas spread to Brazil. Since the founding of the Captaincy of the Bay, several temples have been built in honor of Our Lady of Brotas. In addition to being the patroness of various temples and churches, she is also the patroness of the following mother churches:

- Roman Catholic Archdiocese of São Salvador da Bahia
- Roman Catholic Archdiocese of Mariana
- Roman Catholic Archdiocese of Maceió
- Roman Catholic Archdiocese of Cuiabá
- Roman Catholic Archdiocese of Campinas
- Roman Catholic Diocese of Barra
- Mother Church of Tabuleiro do Norte
- Mother Church of Entre Rios de Minas
- Mother Church of the city of Atalaia

Nossa Senhora das Brotas is most likely the reason why the town of Brotas was named, in honor of the devotion of Dona Francisca Ribeiro dos Reis. Through the Portuguese, the first Catholic temple in India was also built: the Church of Our Lady of Brotas in Angediva. In recognition of its role as a symbolic mother church in the introduction of Catholicism in India, the Church of Our Lady of Brotas received an insignia granted by the Holy See, which is displayed there.

=== In Piraí do Sul ===
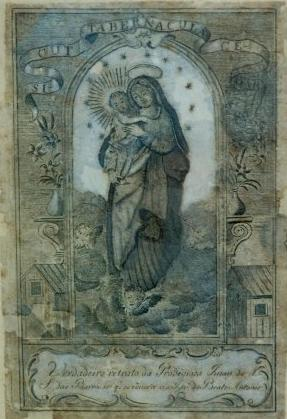
Our Lady of Brotas print.

The history of the devotion to Our Lady of Brotas in the municipality of Piraí do Sul is distinct from other places, as it was influenced by the Portuguese. It began in 1808, when Friar Antonio de Sant'Ana Galvão, now Saint Friar Galvão, on a mission for the Franciscan Province of the Immaculate Conception, arrived on the banks of the Piraí River. He decided to stay in the village for a few days, preaching and attending to the local people. During his stay, he lodged at the house of Ana Rosa Conceição de Paula. When he left the house where he had been welcomed, he gave her a print of Our Lady of the Barracks, with the dedication: "Souvenir of Friar Galvão.", and saying:

Always venerate this holy effigy, because it is very miraculous.

The print was placed on a hardboard to preserve it better, surrounded by a wooden frame, and was given a very prominent place in her home.

Years later, Ana Rosa de Paula remarried Joaquim Maciel and moved in with him. During the move, the print was lost, and despite searching, they could not find it. One day, while walking around her house, in the area where bushes had been completely destroyed by a large fire, Mrs. Ana found the print on December 26, among roots and new shoots of vegetation. The fire had completely destroyed the wooden frame but had not harmed the paper print, which was slightly scorched. Perplexed by this fact, they interpreted it as a miracle worked by Our Lady. As a result, people decided to rename the print Our Lady of Brotas.

In 2004, Our Lady of Brotas was recognized and declared “Patroness of the Troop Route,” which is part of the route from Sengés to Rio Negro, passing through 16 municipalities in Paraná.

At the bottom of the print is the phrase: “True portrait of the Prodigious Image of Our Lady of the Barracks, which is venerated in the Church of Blessed Anthony,” indicating that the engraving is a faithful copy of the original image venerated in the church of St. Anthony of Padua, born in Lisbon.

The original title of “Our Lady of the Barracks” was never used by the people, who simply called her “Saint.” However, from the day she was found amid the ashes and new shoots, she became known as “Our Lady of the Brotas.”

== Bibliography ==
- Husman, Guido (1964). A Paróquia do Senhor Menino Deus e o Santuário de Nossa Senhora das Brotas [The Parish of the Lord Child God and the Shrine of Our Lady of Brotas] (in Portuguese). Petrópolis: Editora Vozes Ltda.

== See also ==
- Titles of Mary, mother of Jesus
- Frei Galvão
