= Palmital River =

There are several rivers named Palmital River in Brazil:

- Palmital River (Goiás)
- Palmital River (Paraná)
- Palmital River (Pardo River tributary)
- Palmital River (Santa Catarina)

== See also ==
- Palmital (disambiguation)
