= Itaiópolis =

- Municipality
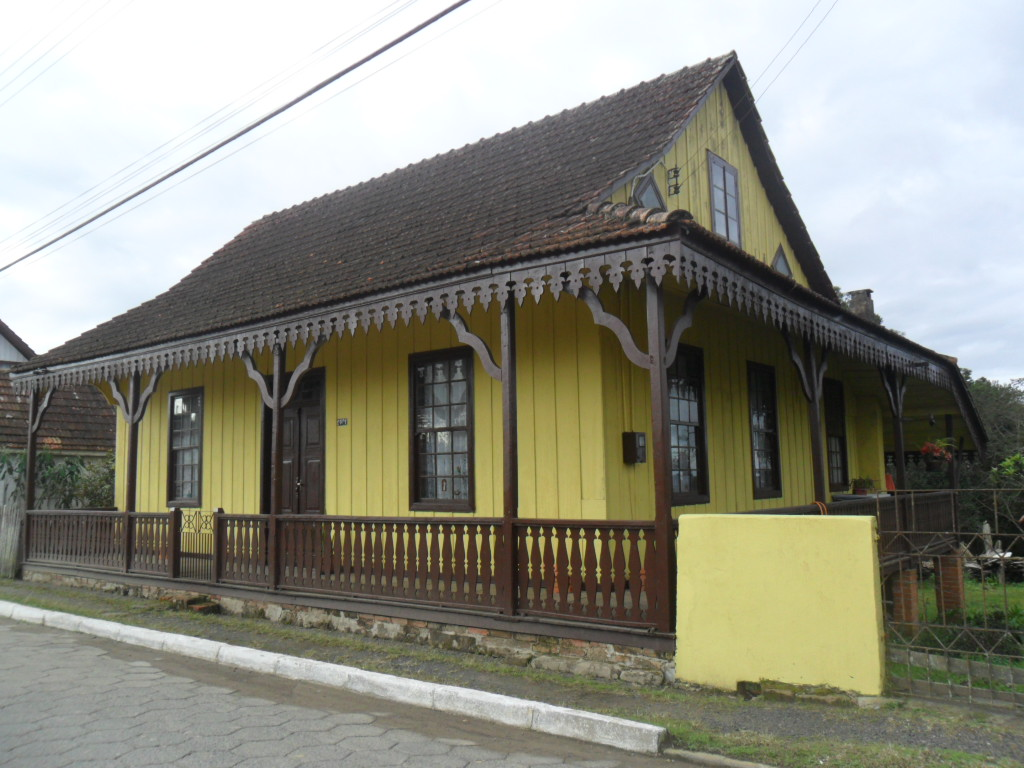

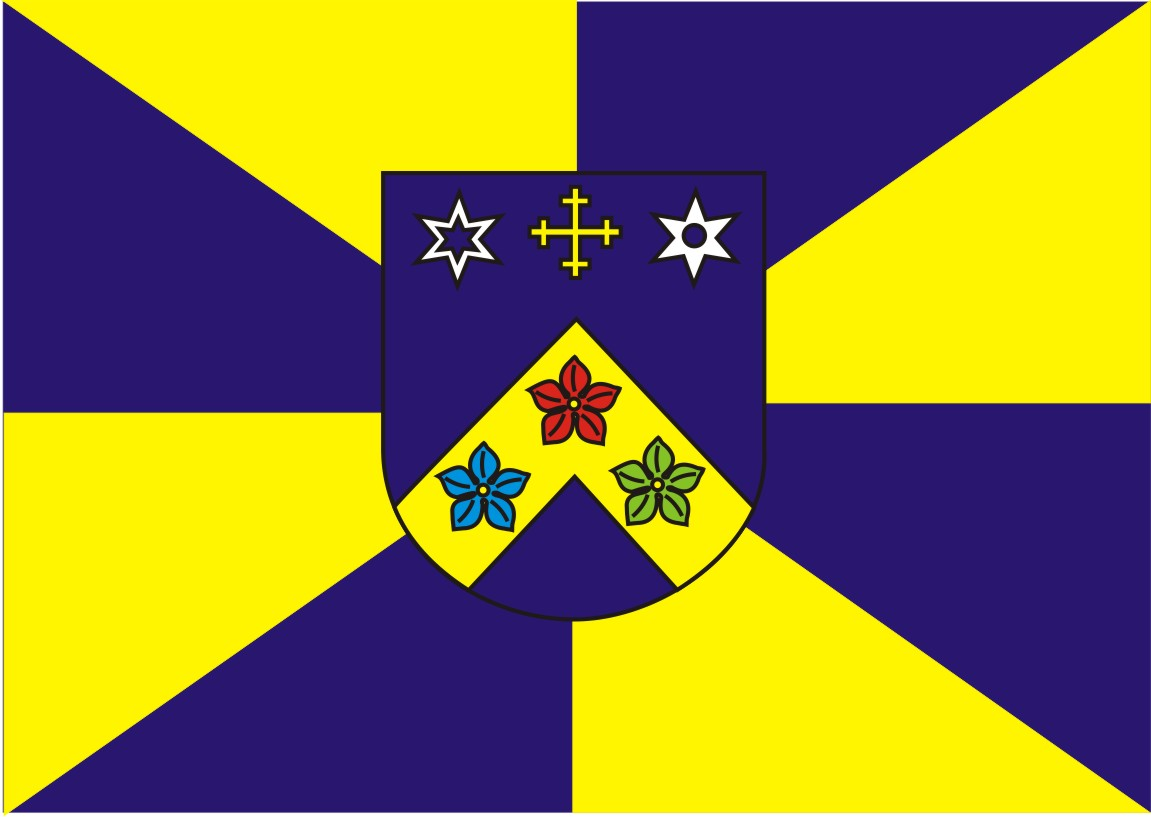
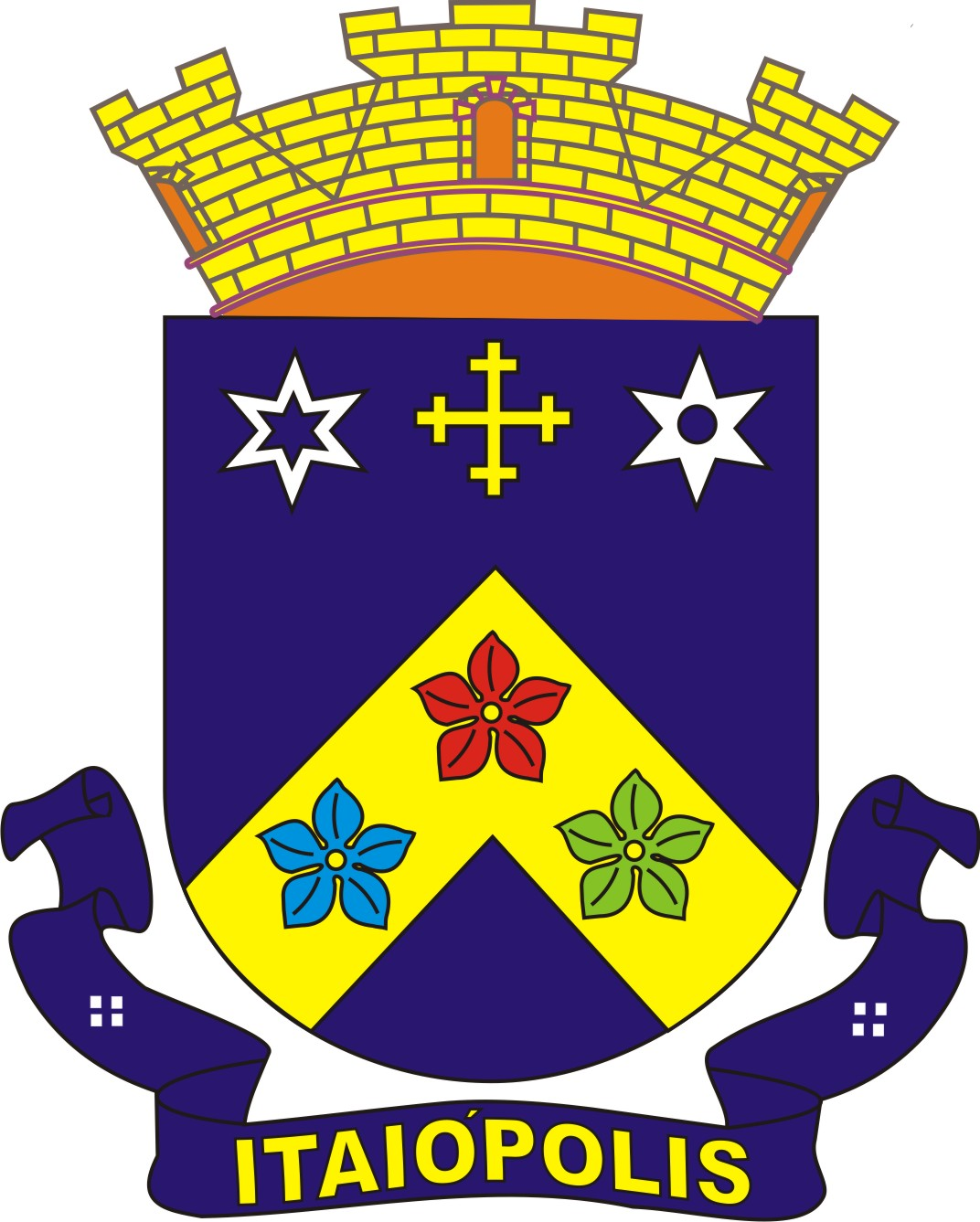
- Flag Coat of arms

- Location in Brazil
- Coordinates: 26°20′09″S 49°54′21″W
- Country: Brazil
- Region: South
- State: Santa Catarina
- Mesoregion: Norte Catarinense

Population (2020)
  - Total: 21,780
- Time zone: UTC -3

Itaiópolis is a municipality in the state of Santa Catarina in the South region of Brazil.

== See also ==
- List of municipalities in Santa Catarina
