= Reserva, Paraná =

Coordinates: 24°39′00″S 50°51′03″W

- Municipality
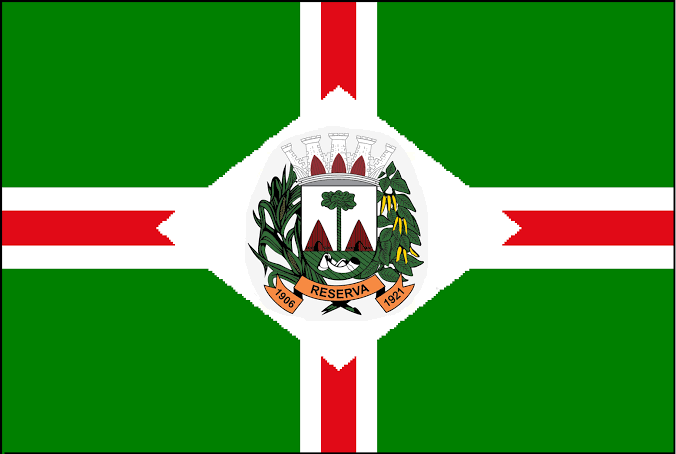
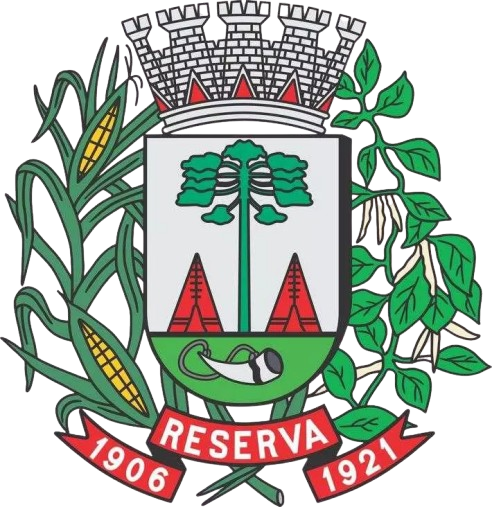
- Flag Seal

- Country: Brazil
- Region: Southern
- State: Paraná
- Mesoregion: Centro Oriental Paranaense
- Elevated to District: 20 April 1906
- Emancipated: 03 January 1921
- Officially Installed: 26 March 1921

Government
  - Mayor: Lucas Machado (Podemos)

Population (2020)
  - Total: 26,825
- Time zone: UTC−3 (BRT)
- CEP: 84320-000
- Area code: +55 42
- HDI: 0,618 - medium (2010)
- Website: reserva.pr.gov.br (City Hall) www.camarareserva.pr.gov.br (City Council)

Reserva, Paraná is a municipality in the state of Paraná in the Southern Region of Brazil.

== See also ==
- List of municipalities in Paraná
