= Alto Piquiri =

Coordinates: 24°01′S 53°28′W

- Municipality
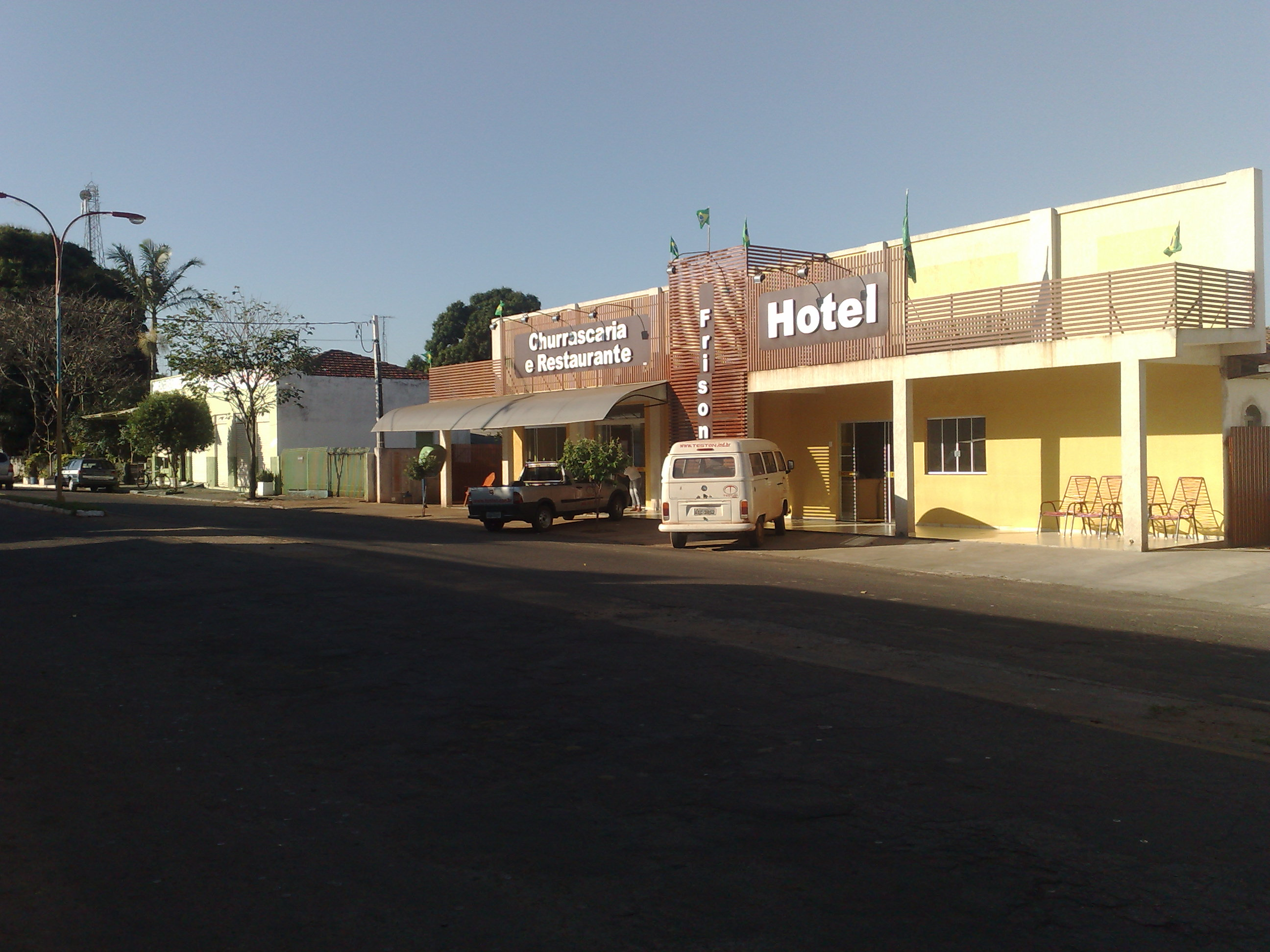

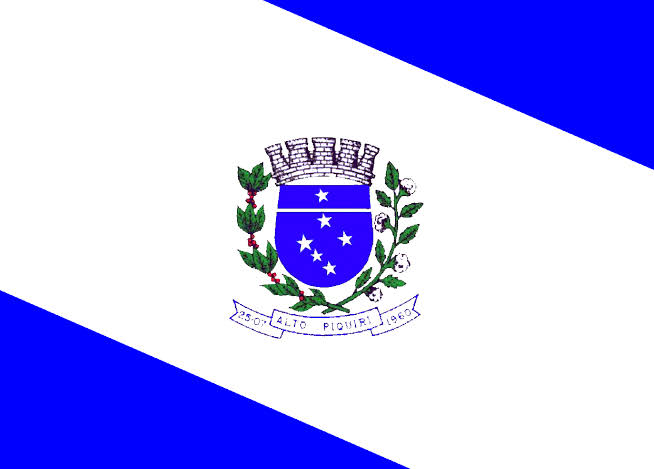
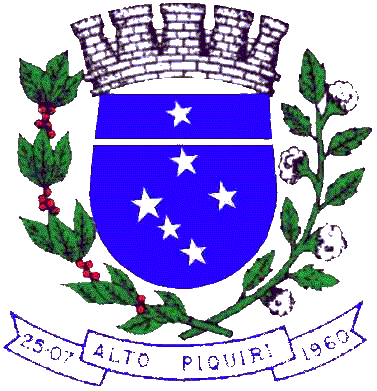
- Flag Coat of arms
- Interactive map of Alto Piquiri
- Country: Brazil
- Region: Southern
- State: Paraná
- Mesoregion: Noroeste Paranaense

Population (2020)
  - Total: 9,778
- Time zone: UTC−3 (BRT)

Alto Piquiri is a municipality in the state of Paraná in the Southern Region of Brazil.

== See also ==
- List of municipalities in Paraná
