= Santa Margarida do Sul =

Municipality of Rio Grande do Sul, Brazil

- Municipality
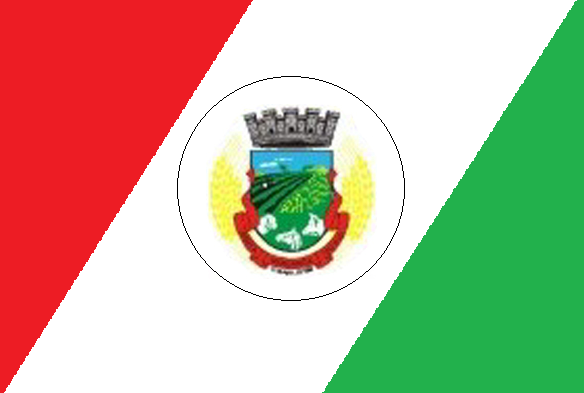
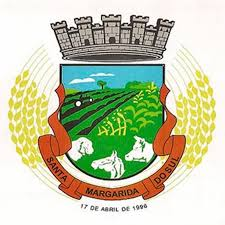
- Flag Coat of arms

- Location of Santa Margarida do Sul in Rio Grande do Sul

- Location in Brazil
- Coordinates: 30°20′24″S 54°4′48″W
- Country: Brazil
- Region: Southern
- State: Rio Grande do Sul
- Mesoregion: Sudoeste Rio-Grandense

Population (2020)
  - Total: 2,578
- Time zone: UTC−3 (BRT)

Santa Margarida do Sul is a municipality in the state of Rio Grande do Sul in the Southern Region of Brazil.

== See also ==
- List of municipalities in Rio Grande do Sul
