= Inácio Martins =

Coordinates: 25.5708°S 51.0789°W

- Municipality
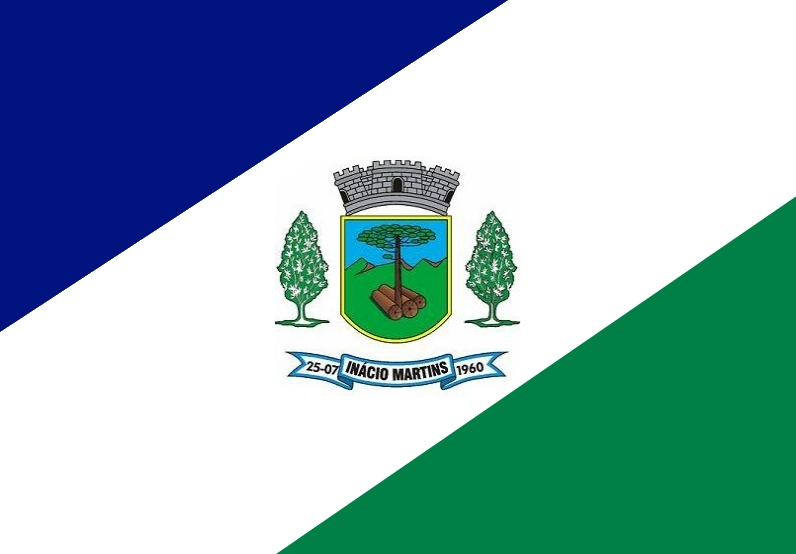
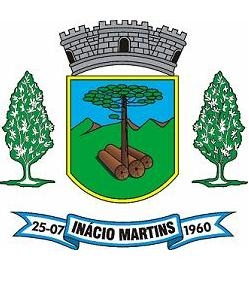
- Flag Coat of arms
- Interactive map of Inácio Martins
- Country: Brazil
- Region: Southern
- State: Paraná
- Mesoregion: Centro-Sul Paranaense

Population (2020)
  - Total: 11,121
- Time zone: UTC−3 (BRT)

Inácio Martins is a municipality in the state of Paraná in the Southern Region of Brazil.

== See also ==
- List of municipalities in Paraná
