= Nova Cantu =

Coordinates: 24.6728°S 52.5689°W

- Municipality
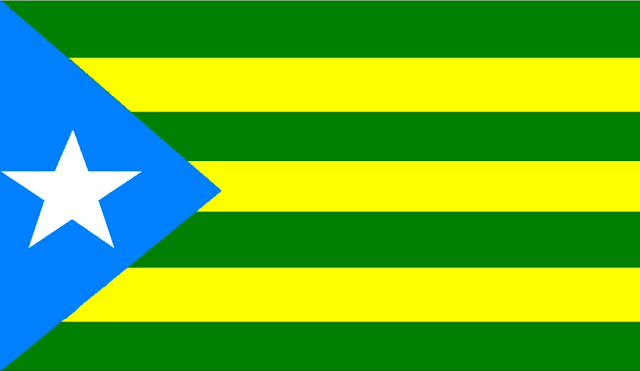
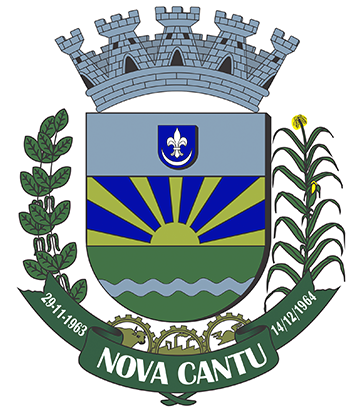
- Flag Coat of arms
- Interactive map of Nova Cantu
- Country: Brazil
- Region: Southern
- State: Paraná
- Mesoregion: Centro Ocidental Paranaense

Population (2020)
  - Total: 5,061
- Time zone: UTC−3 (BRT)

Nova Cantu is a municipality in the state of Paraná in the Southern Region of Brazil.

== Climate ==
Climate data for Nova Cantu, elevation 540 m (1,770 ft), (1976–2013)
Month	Jan	Feb	Mar	Apr	May	Jun	Jul	Aug	Sep	Oct	Nov	Dec	Year
Record high °C (°F)	38.6 (101.5)	39.0 (102.2)	38.4 (101.1)	35.4 (95.7)	33.2 (91.8)	31.2 (88.2)	32.0 (89.6)	35.8 (96.4)	39.0 (102.2)	39.6 (103.3)	39.6 (103.3)	39.0 (102.2)	39.6 (103.3)
Mean daily maximum °C (°F)	30.7 (87.3)	30.5 (86.9)	30.1 (86.2)	28.1 (82.6)	24.4 (75.9)	23.2 (73.8)	23.6 (74.5)	26.0 (78.8)	26.8 (80.2)	28.5 (83.3)	29.6 (85.3)	30.4 (86.7)	27.7 (81.8)
Daily mean °C (°F)	24.4 (75.9)	24.0 (75.2)	23.4 (74.1)	21.3 (70.3)	18.0 (64.4)	16.8 (62.2)	16.9 (62.4)	18.8 (65.8)	20.0 (68.0)	22.1 (71.8)	23.2 (73.8)	24.1 (75.4)	21.1 (69.9)
Mean daily minimum °C (°F)	19.8 (67.6)	19.6 (67.3)	18.8 (65.8)	16.6 (61.9)	13.6 (56.5)	12.5 (54.5)	12.4 (54.3)	13.6 (56.5)	14.8 (58.6)	17.0 (62.6)	18.0 (64.4)	19.3 (66.7)	16.3 (61.4)
Record low °C (°F)	11.2 (52.2)	10.6 (51.1)	6.2 (43.2)	2.0 (35.6)	0.0 (32.0)	−2.0 (28.4)	−2.8 (27.0)	−2.0 (28.4)	0.0 (32.0)	6.0 (42.8)	8.2 (46.8)	11.0 (51.8)	−2.8 (27.0)
Average precipitation mm (inches)	196.6 (7.74)	190.8 (7.51)	156.6 (6.17)	162.2 (6.39)	176.2 (6.94)	145.5 (5.73)	114.4 (4.50)	86.8 (3.42)	154.4 (6.08)	213.2 (8.39)	160.6 (6.32)	204.1 (8.04)	1,961.4 (77.23)
Average precipitation days (≥ 1.0 mm)	13	13	11	9	9	8	8	6	10	11	11	13	122
Average relative humidity (%)	75	77	74	73	75	75	70	63	64	68	67	72	71
Mean monthly sunshine hours	215.7	186.1	215.2	205.0	193.6	178.7	200.1	214.1	190.1	202.0	213.4	214.7	2,428.7
Source: IDR-Paraná

== See also ==
- List of municipalities in Paraná
