= Castro, Paraná =

Castro
- Municipality
- Municipality of Castro
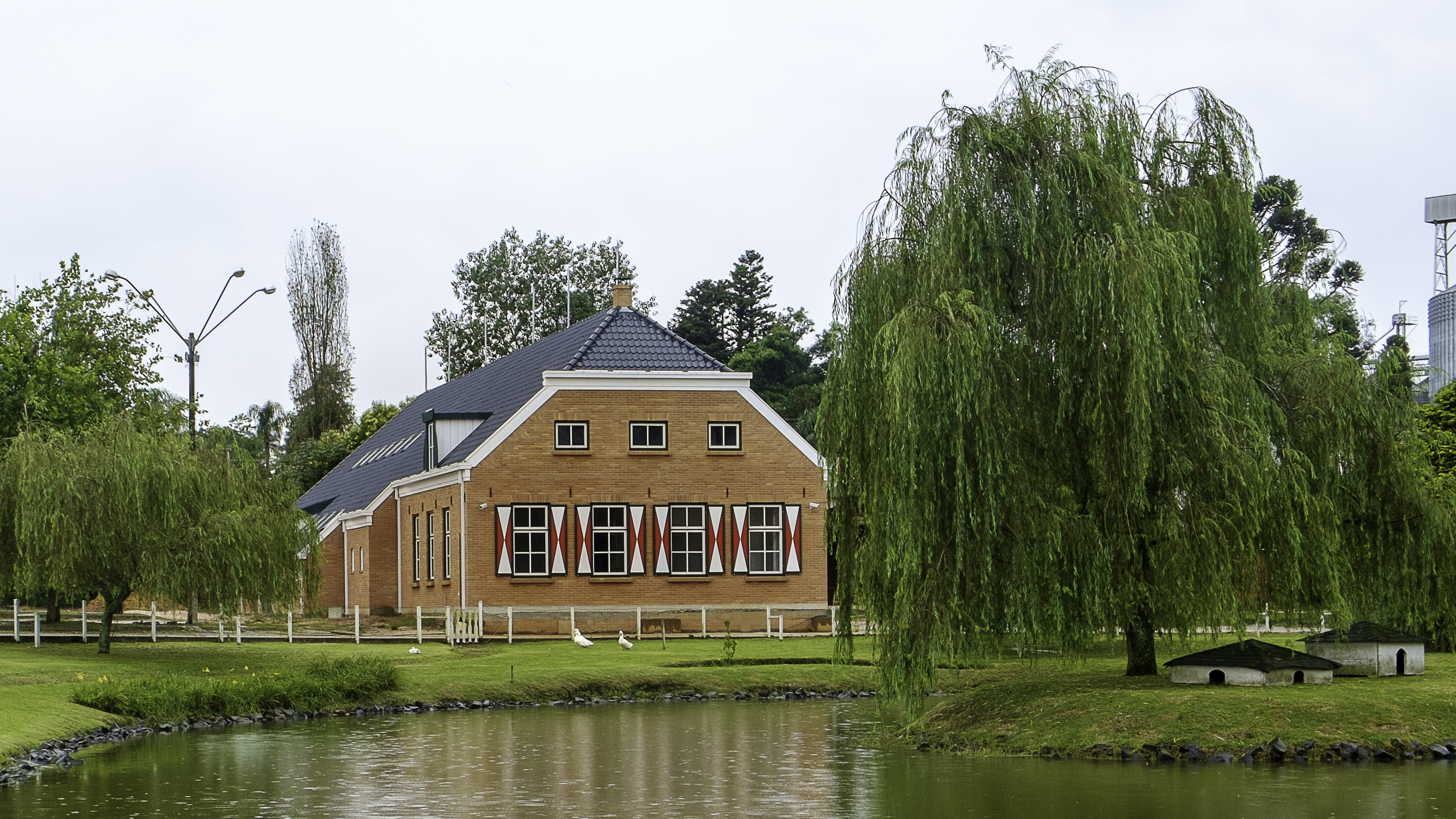

- Flag Coat of arms

- Municipal location

- Location in Brazil
- Coordinates: 24°47′27″S 50°0′43″W
- Country: Brazil
- Region: South
- State: Paraná
- Mesoregion: Centro Oriental Paranaense

Population (2020)
  - Total: 71,809
- Time zone: UTC -3
- Area code: 42
- HDI (2010): 0.703 – high

Castro is a municipality in the state of Paraná in the Southern Region of Brazil. In 2020 it had a population of 71,809 people. The main road running through the town is the PR-151 road.

== History ==
The first inhabitants were the indigenous people in the region before the city was settled, Castro was settled on 19 March 1704, and it became municipality in 1857. In the 1930s, the largest European Immigration happened, they were Dutch, Russians, Italians and Ukrainians.

== Economy ==
Castrolanda is a colony that was founded by Dutch immigrants between 1951 and 1954. Testament to this there is a windmill in Castro. Its economy is based on agricultural production and dairy farming which is one of the most important in this region that is considered the largest dairy in Brazil due to their genetic quality. It has a considerable production of grain, mostly soy and beans. Also having one of the largest agricultural cooperatives in Brazil, which bears the name of the colony.

== Geography ==
=== Climate ===
The climate of Castro is oceanic climate (Köppen climate classification: Cfb), the average temperature on summer is 25°C, on winter the temperature reaches to 11°C, the temperature rarely drops below 5°C or exceeds 15°C. Frost is common in winter. The highest temperature was 35°C on 4 January 1949. The lowest temperature was -7°C on 1 August 1955.

Climate data for Castro (1981–2010)
Month	Jan	Feb	Mar	Apr	May	Jun	Jul	Aug	Sep	Oct	Nov	Dec	Year
Mean daily maximum °C (°F)	26.8 (80.2)	26.9 (80.4)	26.4 (79.5)	24.6 (76.3)	21.4 (70.5)	20.5 (68.9)	20.2 (68.4)	22.1 (71.8)	22.3 (72.1)	24.4 (75.9)	25.8 (78.4)	26.5 (79.7)	24.0 (75.2)
Daily mean °C (°F)	20.9 (69.6)	20.7 (69.3)	19.9 (67.8)	17.9 (64.2)	14.3 (57.7)	12.9 (55.2)	12.5 (54.5)	13.9 (57.0)	15.3 (59.5)	17.6 (63.7)	19.2 (66.6)	20.2 (68.4)	17.1 (62.8)
Mean daily minimum °C (°F)	16.8 (62.2)	16.6 (61.9)	15.8 (60.4)	13.7 (56.7)	9.6 (49.3)	7.9 (46.2)	7.3 (45.1)	8.1 (46.6)	10.4 (50.7)	12.9 (55.2)	14.4 (57.9)	15.6 (60.1)	12.4 (54.3)
Average precipitation mm (inches)	196.8 (7.75)	150.3 (5.92)	136.1 (5.36)	90.7 (3.57)	125.3 (4.93)	86.2 (3.39)	92.1 (3.63)	68.1 (2.68)	132.2 (5.20)	148.8 (5.86)	123.2 (4.85)	135.6 (5.34)	1,485.4 (58.48)
Average precipitation days (≥ 1.0 mm)	15	13	11	7	7	6	6	5	9	10	10	11	110
Average relative humidity (%)	84.0	84.6	84.6	84.9	85.8	85.5	83.8	81.8	82.2	82.2	80.1	81.2	83.4
Mean monthly sunshine hours	135.6	127.9	152.9	141.0	141.1	139.9	152.7	152.4	124.3	128.2	147.9	134.2	1,678.1
Source: Instituto Nacional de Meteorologia

== Notable people ==
- Bruninha (born 2002), footballer
- Aimée de Heeren (1903–2006), WW2 secret service agent, girlfriend of Joseph P. Kennedy Jr., socialite
- Paulo Miranda (born 1988), footballer

== See also ==
- List of municipalities in Paraná
