= Piraí do Sul =

Municipality in Southern, Brazil

- Municipality
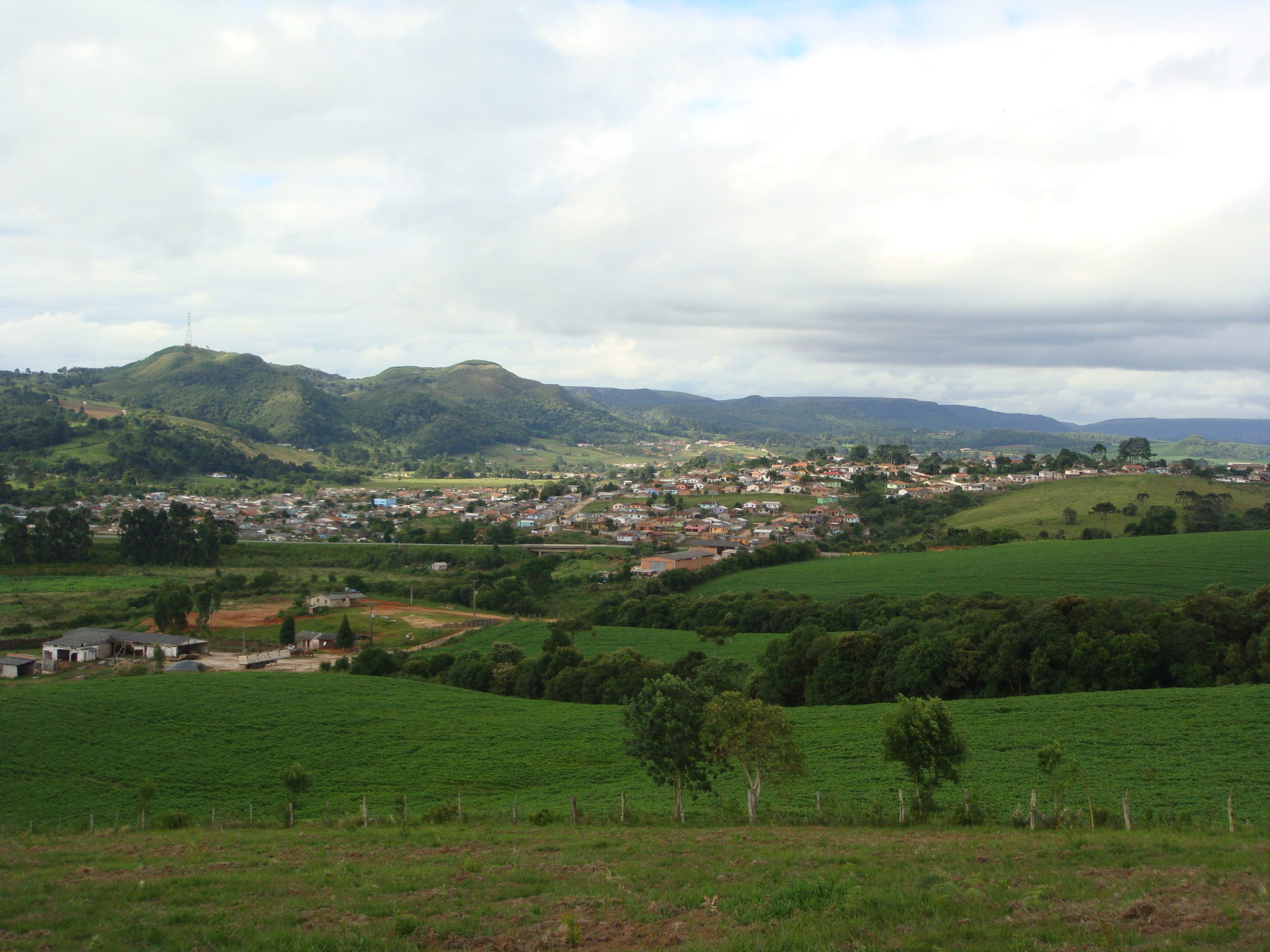
- View of Piraí do Sul

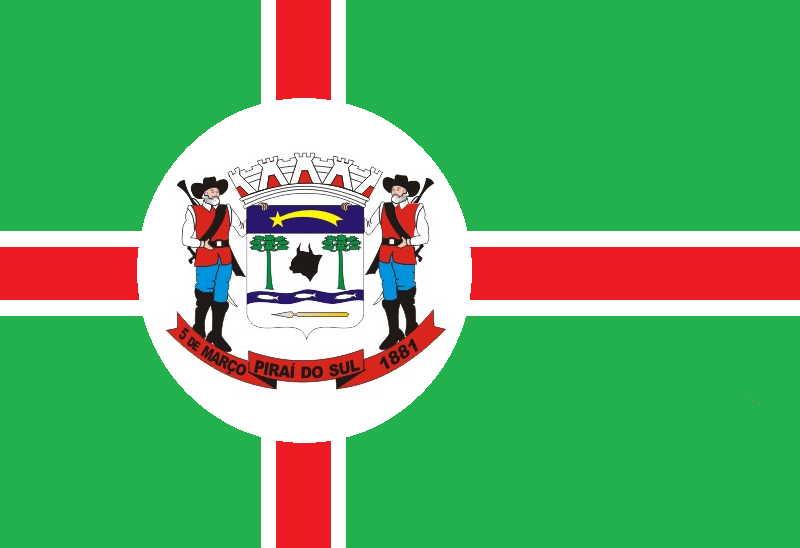
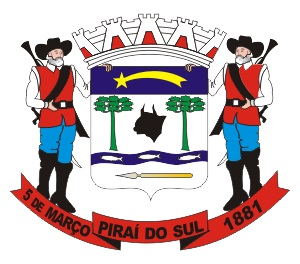
- Flag Coat of arms
- Interactive map of Piraí do Sul
- Coordinates: 24°32′05″S 49°56′20″W
- Country: Brazil
- Region: Southern
- State: Paraná
- Mesoregion: Centro Oriental Paranaense

Population (2020)
  - Total: 25,617
- Time zone: UTC−3 (BRT)

Piraí do Sul is a municipality in the state of Paraná in the Southern Region of Brazil.

The agriculture, production and industrialization of wood are the main sources of economy of Piraí do Sul with high industrial rate: 177 companies operate in town. Agricultural production is also an important sector, especially the harvest of corn, soybeans and wheat. By the end of 2012, total consumption of its 23700 inhabitants should reach BRL 260 million, being the 84th in the state ranking. Piraí do Sul also has tourism potential, especially religious one the city is the fourth destination in the most sought religious tourism in Brazil thanks to the Shrine of Our Lady of the sprout, the patron saint of Drovers Route.

== History ==
Piraí do Sul became a municipality on 24 July 1882.

On August 8, 2026, an F4 tornado moved through rural areas of the municipality, dealing extreme damage to trees and destroying multiple homes. This was the first violent tornado in Brazil since the 2025 Guarapuava tornado, which was also in Paraná.

== Climate ==
According to the Köppen climate classification, Piraí do Sul is classified as oceanic climate (Köppen: Cfb). The average temperature on summer are 26°C, on winter the temperature reaches to 19°C. Frost are common on winter.

== See also ==
- List of municipalities in Paraná
- Parish Church of Piraí do Sul
