= Palmital, Paraná =

Coordinates: 24°53′34″S 52°12′10″W

- Municipality
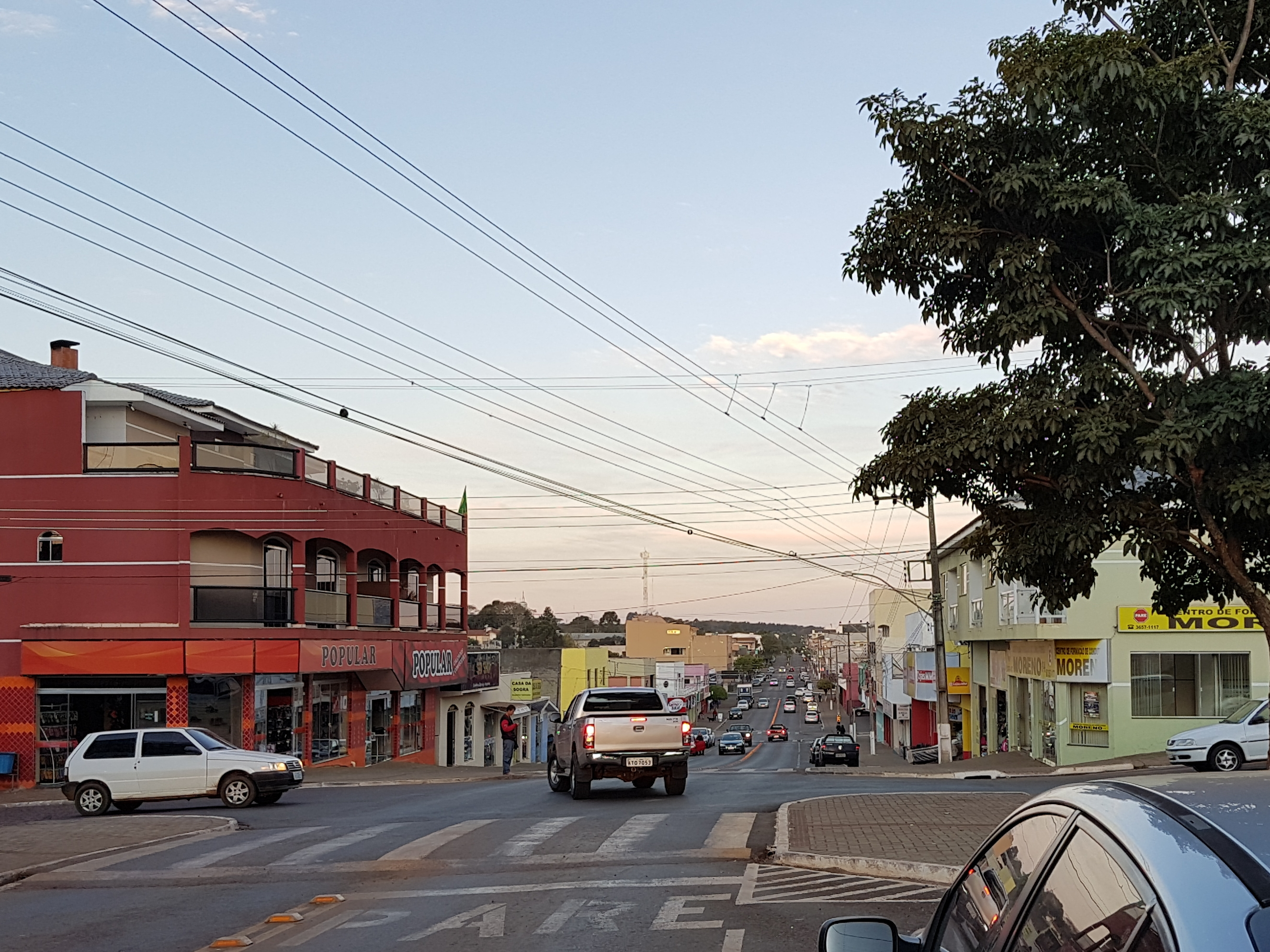
- View of Palmital, Paraná

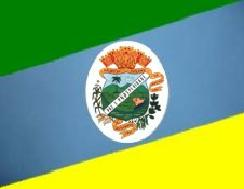
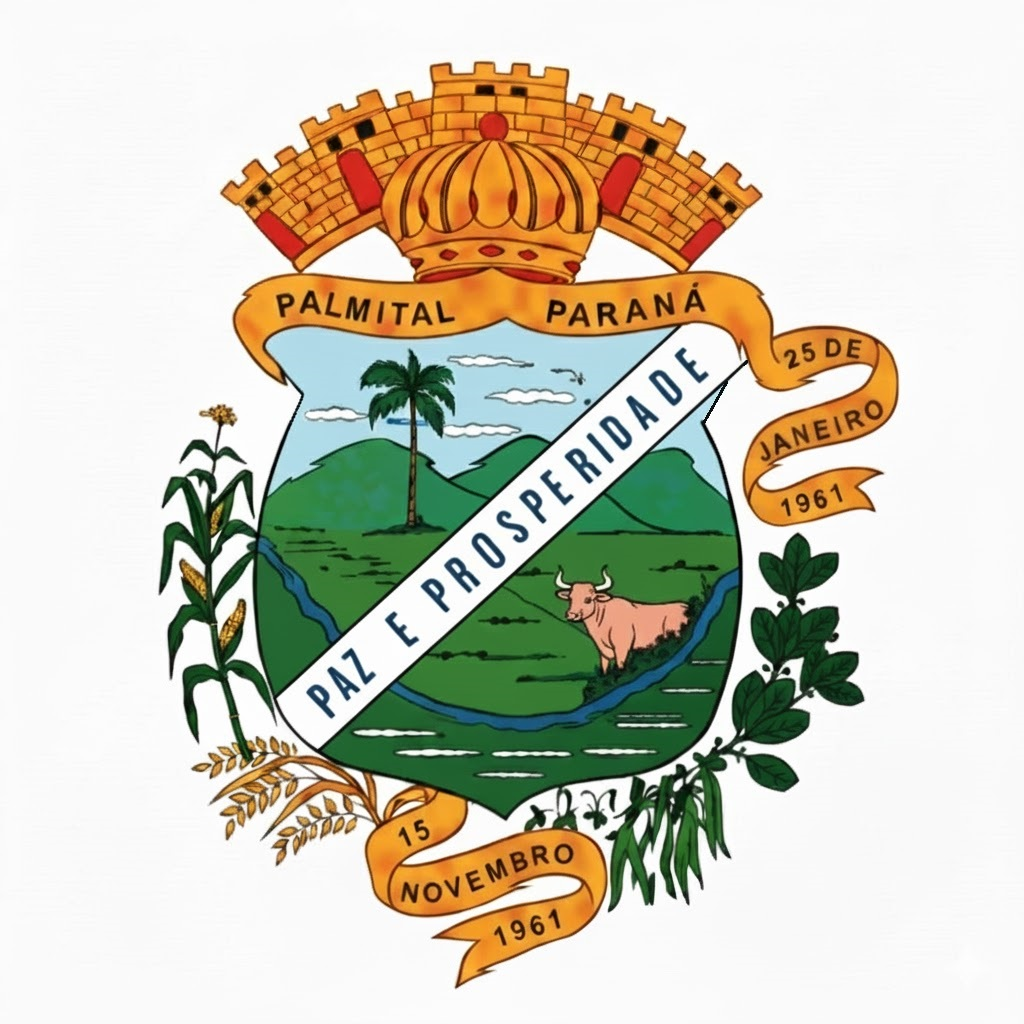
- Flag Coat of arms
- Interactive map of Palmital, Paraná
- Country: Brazil
- Region: Southern
- State: Paraná
- Mesoregion: Centro-Sul Paranaense

Population (2020)
  - Total: 12,960
- Time zone: UTC−3 (BRT)

Palmital, Paraná is a municipality in the state of Paraná in the Southern Region of Brazil.

== See also ==
- List of municipalities in Paraná
