= Rota Romântica =

Scenic route in Rio Grande do Sul, Brazil

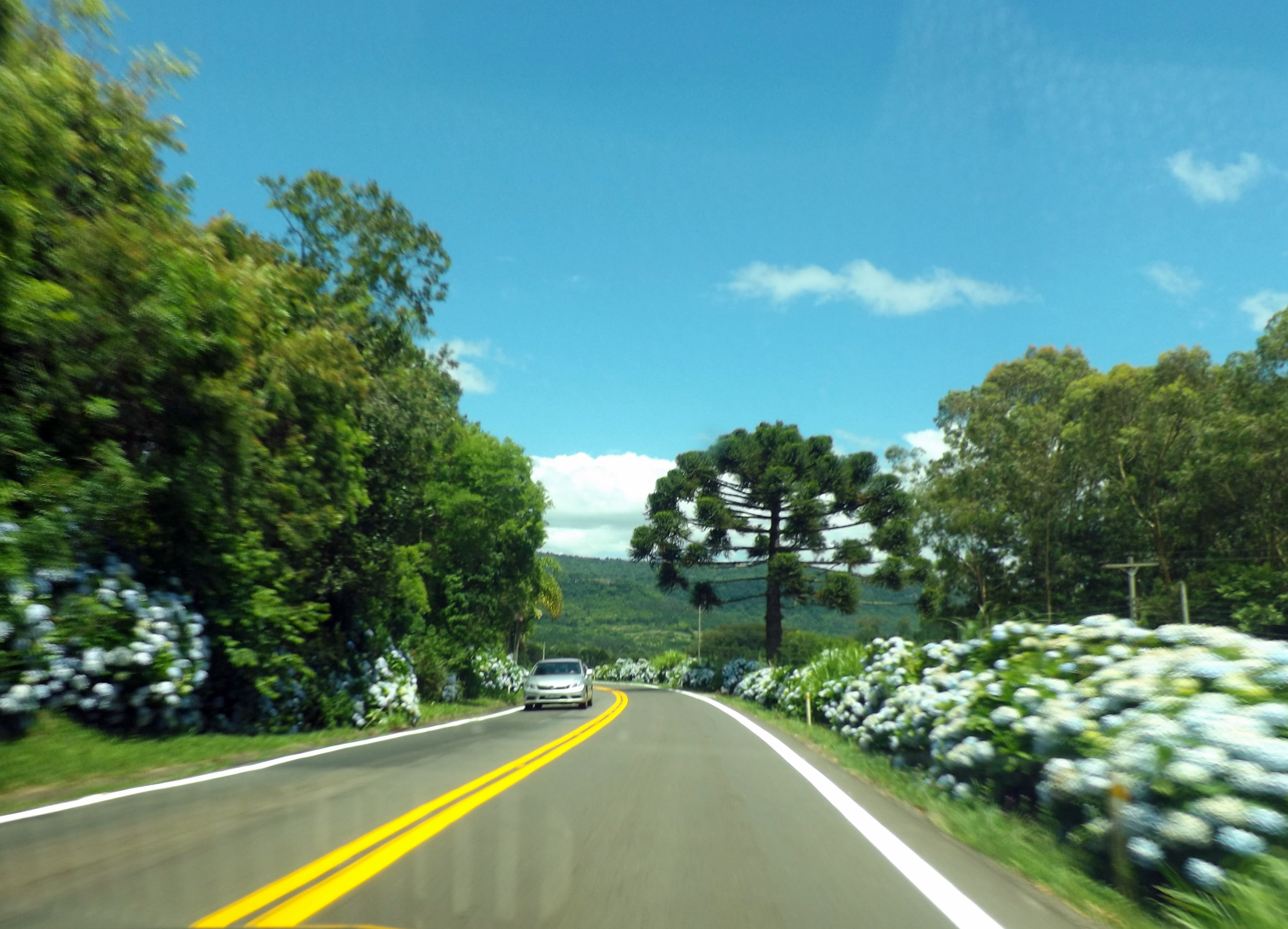
Rio Grande do Sul State Road RS-235, the road is lined by blue hydrangea flowers

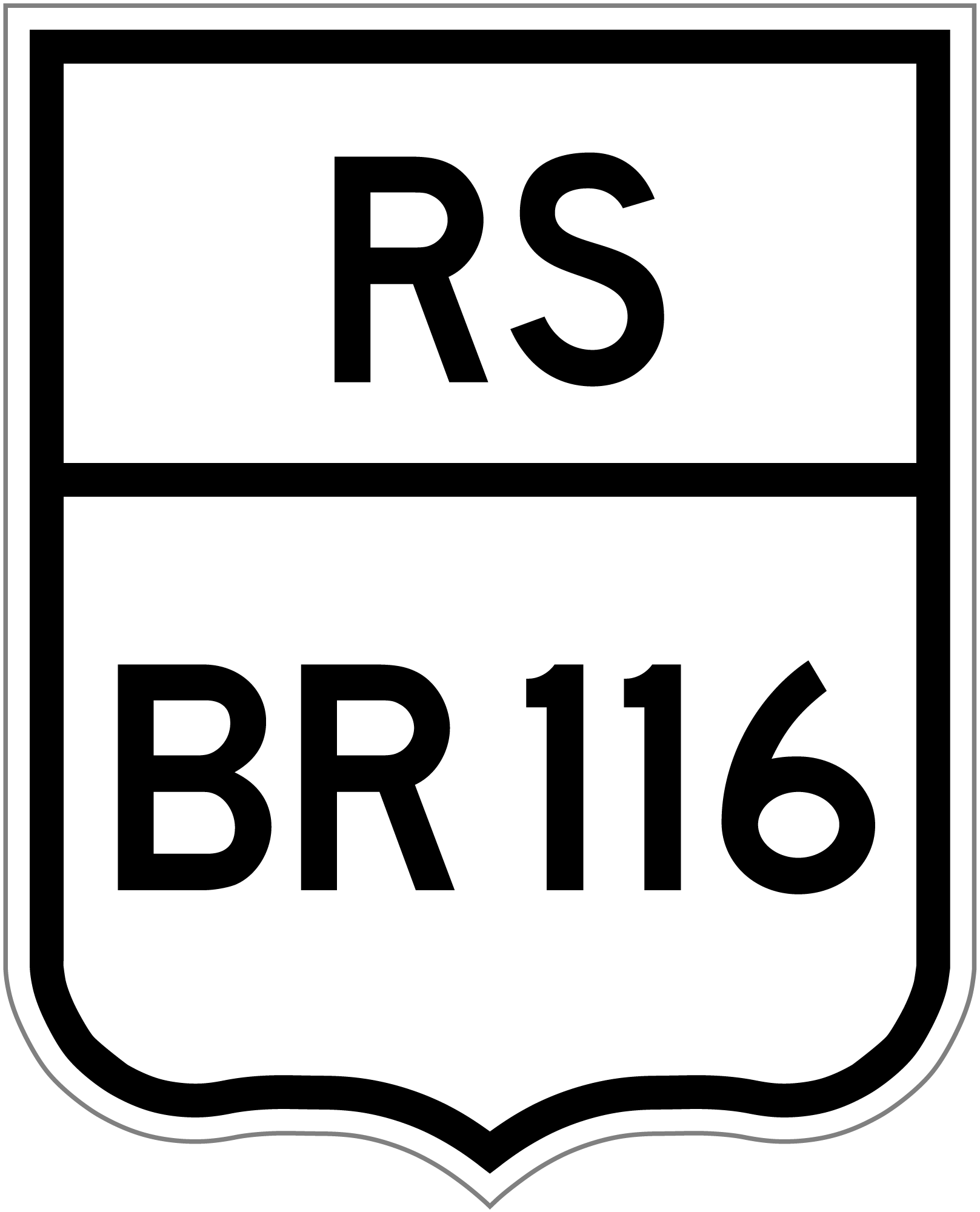

The Rota Romântica (lit. 'Romantic Route') is a scenic tourist route that runs through 13 municipalities located in the Serra Gaúcha region of the Brazilian state of Rio Grande do Sul. The area was first colonized by German immigrants in the first half of the 19th century, and the strong German influence can still be seen in each of the towns and villages.

The Rota Romântica is approximately 184 km (114 mi) in distance and extends from São Leopoldo to São Francisco de Paula. The 13 municipalities along the route are: São Leopoldo, Novo Hamburgo, Estância Velha, Ivoti, Dois Irmãos, Morro Reuter, Santa Maria do Herval, Presidente Lucena, Picada Café, Nova Petrópolis, Gramado, Canela, São Francisco de Paula, and Linha Nova.

The cities of Nova Petrópolis, Gramado, Canela, and São Francisco de Paula are also included in the Região das Hortênsias, one of Brazil's tourist hot spots and very popular throughout the country in the winter and holiday seasons, for its breath-taking scenery, rich European cultural heritage and picturesque architecture.

== Related routes ==
=== Circuito de Cicloturismo ===
The Circuito de Cicloturismo (lit. 'Cycling Tourism Circuit') was inaugurated in 2020. The route is 355 kilometres (221 miles) long and passes through 14 municipalities in the Rota Romântica.

=== Circuito de Caminhadas ===
A 156-kilometre (97-mile) circular walking route titled the Circuito de Caminhadas (lit. 'Hiking circuit') was inaugurated on 17 June 2025. The route passes through eight municipalities in the region: Ivoti, Dois Irmãos, Morro Reuter, Santa Maria do Herval, Nova Petrópolis, Picada Café, Linha Nova, and Presidente Lucena. The trail is intended to be completed over a 9 day period at an average of 17-kilometre (11-mile) a day.

=== Roteiro dos Sinos ===
The Roteiro dos Sinos (lit. 'Bell route') was inaugurated on 7 November 2025 in the municipalities of Estância Velha, São Leopoldo, and Novo Hamburgo in the Sinos River Valley, and was created to highlight the historical religious and cultural traditions of the region. The seven attractions in the route are the Igreja Sagrado Coracao de Jesus and the Igreja Evangelica Luterana in Estância Velha, the Santuário Padre Reus, Colégio São José, Centro de Espiritualidade Cristo Rei in São Leopoldo, and the Igreja Três Reis Magos and Santuário das Mães in Novo Hamburgo.
