= Café com mistura =

Café com mistura (breakfast with mixture), also known as café com isca, café-de-duas-mãos, café gordo and café-conosco, is a meal from South Brazil, but also eaten in Southeast. Despite the name, it is not necessarily eaten in the morning. It is simpler than café colonial, being composed of pies, bread, jam cold cuts, sausages, juice, tea, milk coffee, and local dishes that vary from each municipality.

== History ==
Café com mistura has its origins with the local foods eaten by the colonizers of South Brazil, ranging from São Paulo to Rio Grande do Sul.

The meal popularized in about 1938, with the inauguration of Estrada Federal (Federal Road), later known as BR-116. This was the only connection between Porto Alegre and Caxias do Sul to the center of the country, and the constant flux of automobiles stimulated the creation of restaurants. In the 50s, the restaurants Restaurante do Turista, Galeto Copacabana and Restaurante do Posto Weber began selling the meal with products bought from local farmers. Feltes family was specially important on the popularization of the meal.

Several of those restaurants closed with time, as new roads were built and the flux of automobiles diminished. In the 70s, café com mistura evolved to café colonial, with the idea to bring the abundance of food from the countryside to restaurants. But some cities, such as Morro Reuter, decided to sell café com mistura as a simpler, regional option of café colonial. From there on, it was used for tourism on Serra Gaúcha, Sinos River Valley, and other places.

== Characteristics ==
Café com mistura is originated on several local cuisines, including German, caipira and tropeiro cuisine. It is similar to café colonial, but simpler and with local characteristics, with ingredients sold by local producers. It is eaten especially on the municipalities of São Paulo, Paraná and Rio Grande do Sul. It is usually eaten around 11:30 a.m. by caipiras and around 3 p.m., between lunch and dinner, in Paraná.

== Preparation ==
Café com mistura is normally composed of sweet and salty pies, bread, jam, pâté, cold cuts, sausage, juice, tea, and milk coffee. But there are regional variatons.

In Lapa, café com mistura is usually accompanied of café tropeiro and paçoca de pinhão. Rich families also included quirera with pork loin, fried eggs, virado with beans and crackling, boiled corn, cassava, sweet potato, sauteed kale, and homemade cheese and butter.

In Campos de Cima da Serra, café com mistura has cookies, rosca, couscous, cheese and sometimes leftovers.

In Morro Reuter, it has cuca, rosca de polvilho, schmiers, cream, honey and cake.
