= Picada Café =

Municipality of Rio Grande do Sul, Brazil

- Municipality
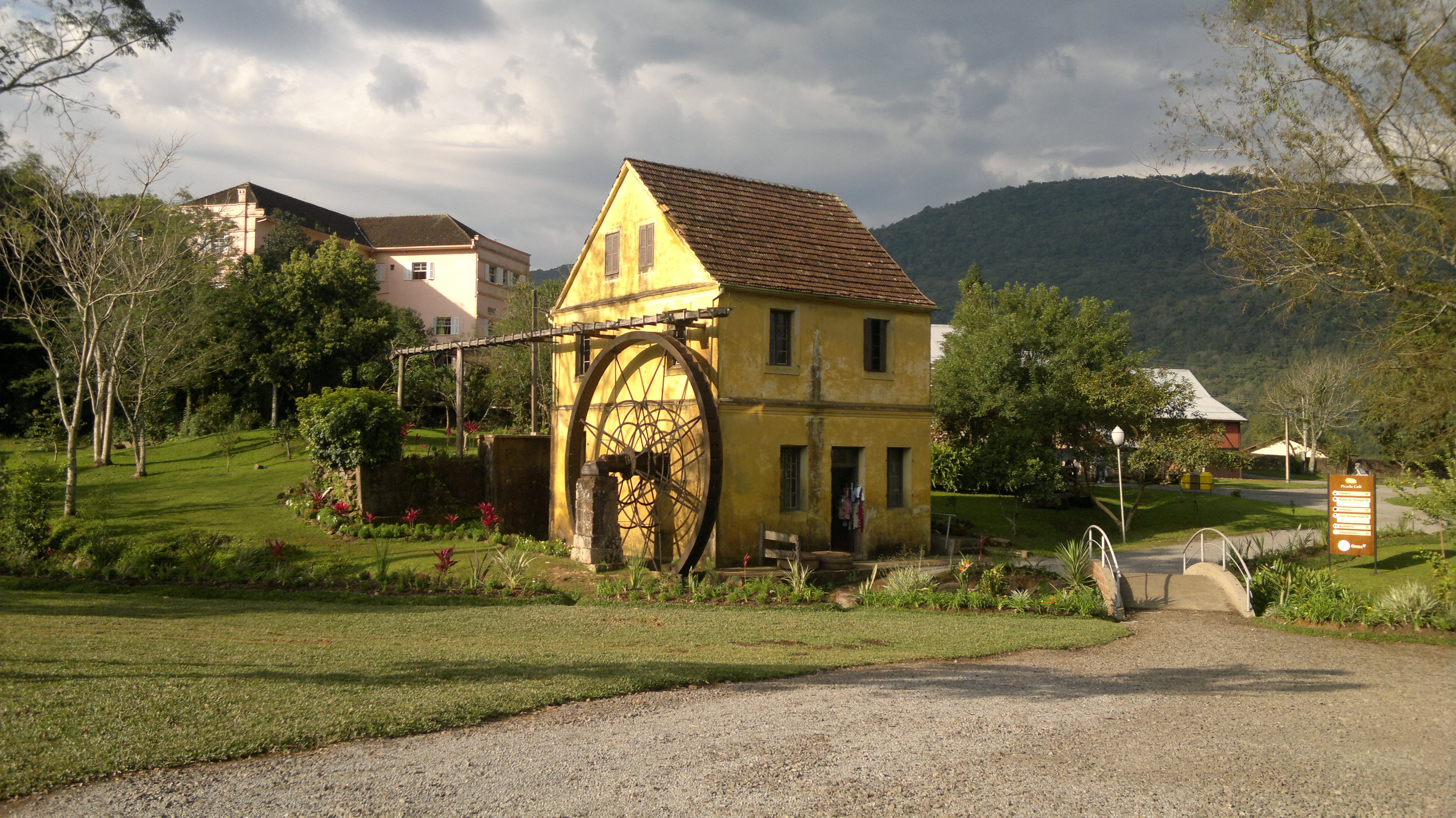

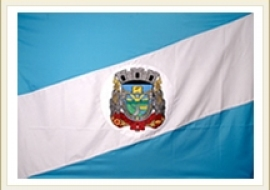
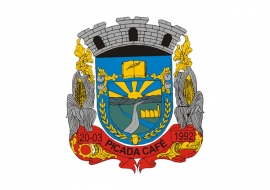
- Flag Coat of arms

- Location within Rio Grande do Sul

- Location in Brazil
- Coordinates: 29.4542°S 51.1364°W
- Country: Brazil
- State: Rio Grande do Sul

Population (2020)
  - Total: 5,738
- Time zone: UTC−3 (BRT)

Picada Café or Kaffeeschneiss in the local German dialect (i.e. Riograndenser Hunsrückisch) is a municipality in the state of Rio Grande do Sul, Brazil. It is located around 80 kilometers from the state capital of Porto Alegre.

== Economy ==
The local economy depends largely on small farming; and increasingly on national (internal) tourism which in turn revolves around its Germanic roots and traditions, perceived as exotic.

== Minority language ==
Since its foundation in 1840s and from its pioneering days onward, the Riograndenser Hunsrückisch language, a Brazilian variety of German largely based on the Rhine Franonian, has been present in this community.

There are many other municipalities with this bilingual profile throughout the state. In 2012 the state chamber of deputies voted unanimously in favor of recognizing this Germanic dialect an official historical culture good to be preserved.

== See also ==
- List of municipalities in Rio Grande do Sul
- Serra Gaúcha
