= Caminhos da Colônia =

Scenic tourist route, Rio Grande do Sul, Brazil

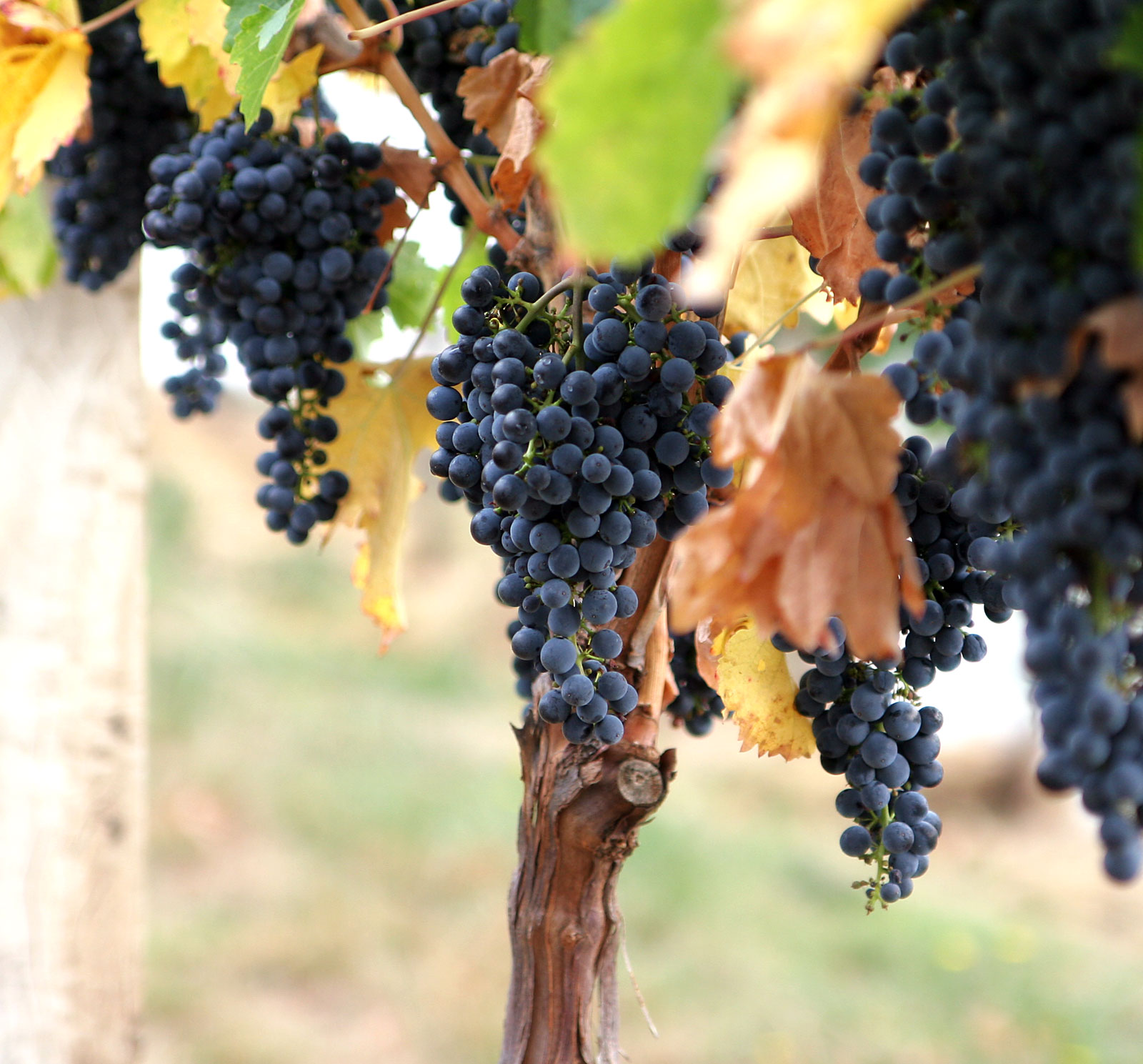
Image of grapes like the ones grown in this region of Rio Grande do Sul, Brazil

Caminhos da Colônia, Portuguese for "Colony Pathway", is a scenic tourist route of four settlements in the Serra Gaúcha in the state of Rio Grande do Sul in southern Brazil. The 35 km route runs between the cities of Caxias do Sul, Flores da Cunha, Otávio Rocha and the old settlement of Santa Justina which never developed into a city like the other three.

The tour route passes through the beautiful wine country of Rio Grande do Sul, highlighting the cities colonized by Italian immigrants more than 100 years ago. Highlights include viewing wineries, cathedrals, museums, old mills and the bucolic and beautiful Italian region of the Serra Gaúcha.
