= Campo Bom =

City in Rio Grande do Sul, Brazil

Município de Campo Bom
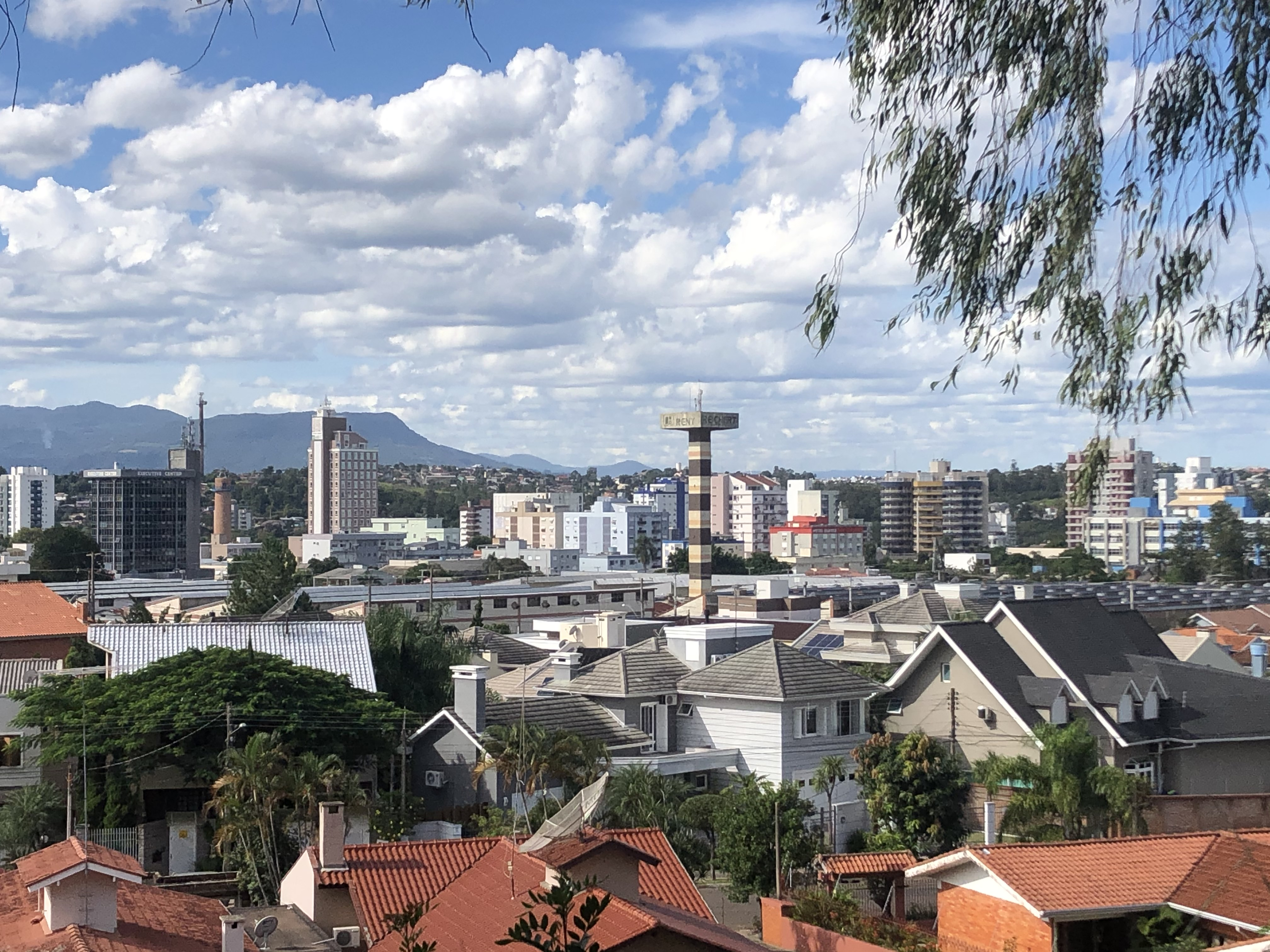
- View of Campo Bom

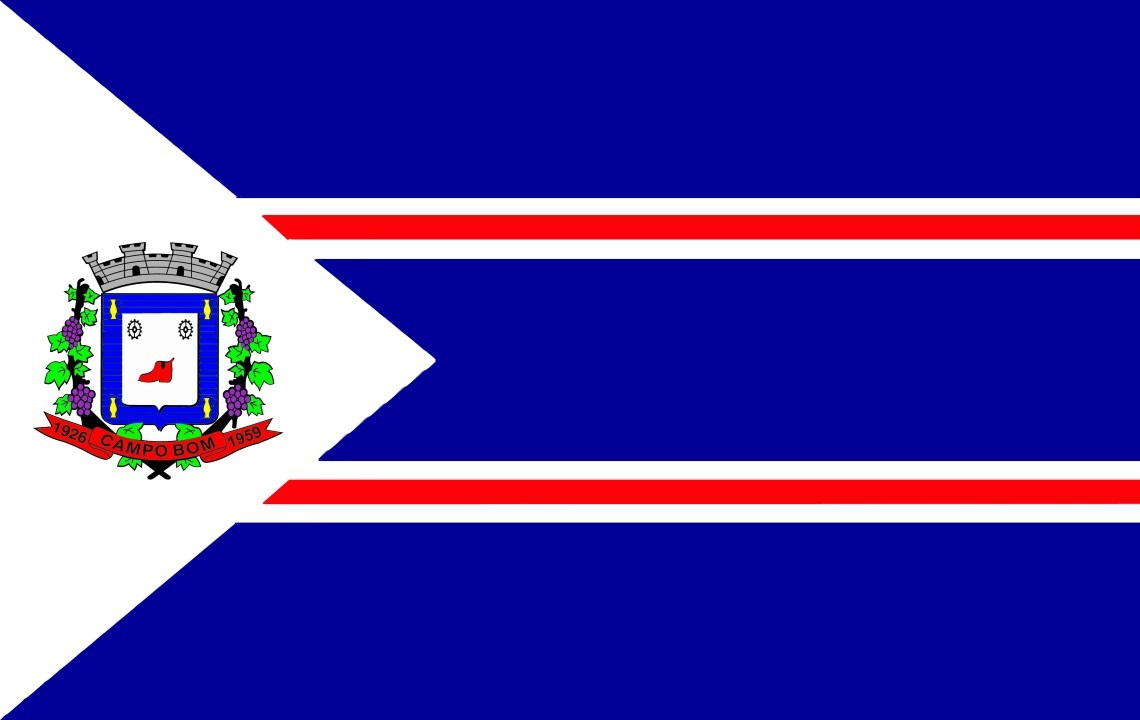
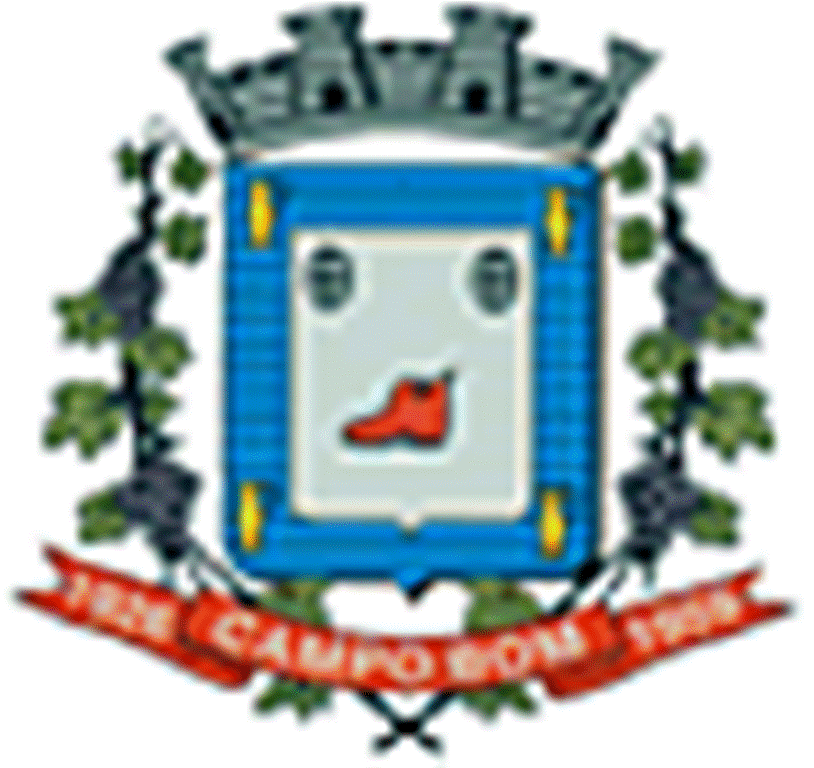
- Flag Coat of arms
- Nickname: The Little Giant of the Valley
- Location in Rio Grande do Sul, Brazil
- Coordinates: 29°40′44″S 51°03′10″W
- Country: Brazil
- Region: South
- State: Rio Grande do Sul
- Founded: 1829
- Incorporated: 1959

Area
  - Total: 61 km^{2} (24 sq mi)
- Elevation: 29 m (95 ft)

Population (2020)
  - Total: 69,458
  - Density: 992.79/km^{2} (2,571.3/sq mi)
- Time zone: UTC−3 (BRT)
- Website: campobom.rs.gov.br

Campo Bom is a town located in the valley of the Sinos River, in the State of Rio Grande do Sul, Brazil. It belongs to the Greater Porto Alegre area.

The city is known as "The little giant of the valley", and it has a diversified industrial economy, including automotive, metallurgical, chemical, pottery and glass industries. Due to its initial development to the footwear sector it is known, along with its neighbour Novo Hamburgo, as the "national shoemaking capital". The town exports to several countries, including Portugal, China, Germany and the United States.

It is one of the most developed cities throughout the State of Rio Grande do Sul. Education, health, leisure and quality of life in the city are references in the Country. The town was also the first city in Brazil to offer free Internet available to 100% of the population and the first dedicated bicycle path in South America built in 1977 having now over 22,000 metres in total, of which 8,000 metres surrounds the city's centre.

== History ==
The colonisation of the town started in 1825 with German immigrants who settled in the town centre, along what is now known as Avenida Brasil. They were mostly Protestants of Lutheran denomination. In 1829 they built the first evangelic temple in southern Brazil.

Initially, agriculture was the only economic activity. Afterwards landmarks such as the Deuner Mill started being built and also brought more economic activity to the town. More recently the Shoemaking Industry, with factories like Reichert, Schutz, Arezzo and Schmidt Irmãos, and commerce have been the main contributors to the town's economic success.

Campo Bom was elevated to a district of São Leopoldo in 1926. The district evolved and was awarded emancipation on January 31, 1959.

The origin of the municipality's name came from the drovers who drove cattle from the Campos de Cima da Serra to São Leopoldo and Porto Alegre, passing through the town. The drovers rested in the shade of trees while the cattle grazed in the good field of the city (good field means Campo Bom).

== Geography ==
Located on the lower slope of the northeast of the state, at latitude 29º40'44" S and longitude 51º03'10" W, Campo Bom is at an altitude of 29 meters above sea level. Its population in 2021 was 69,981 inhabitants. It is located 56.8 km from Porto Alegre, the state capital, via asphalt roads.

It is a municipality that relies on the waters of the Sinos River and records the highest temperatures in the state of Rio Grande do Sul in the summer, and even sometimes during the rest of the year.

According to INMET, relating to the year 1985 and the periods from 1988 to 1998, 2000 and from 2002 onwards, the city's highest recorded temperature was 41.9 °C (107.4 °F) on November 16, 1985, and the lowest was -1.8 °C (28,7 °F) on July 14, 2000, July 25, 2009, and June 8, 2012. The highest precipitation in 24 hours was 209 mm on June 16, 2023, breaking the old record from April 23, 2011, with 154 mm.

=== Climate ===
Climate data for Campo Bom (1981–2010)
Month	Jan	Feb	Mar	Apr	May	Jun	Jul	Aug	Sep	Oct	Nov	Dec	Year
Mean daily maximum °C (°F)	32.2 (90.0)	31.6 (88.9)	30.6 (87.1)	27.2 (81.0)	23.1 (73.6)	20.9 (69.6)	20.5 (68.9)	22.7 (72.9)	23.5 (74.3)	26.8 (80.2)	29.4 (84.9)	31.6 (88.9)	26.7 (80.1)
Daily mean °C (°F)	24.9 (76.8)	24.3 (75.7)	23.3 (73.9)	20.1 (68.2)	16.1 (61.0)	14.3 (57.7)	13.5 (56.3)	15.2 (59.4)	16.7 (62.1)	19.7 (67.5)	22.0 (71.6)	24.0 (75.2)	19.5 (67.1)
Mean daily minimum °C (°F)	19.4 (66.9)	19.4 (66.9)	18.5 (65.3)	15.4 (59.7)	11.7 (53.1)	10.0 (50.0)	9.0 (48.2)	10.2 (50.4)	11.8 (53.2)	14.5 (58.1)	16.2 (61.2)	18.1 (64.6)	14.5 (58.1)
Average precipitation mm (inches)	139.5 (5.49)	130.7 (5.15)	113.7 (4.48)	121.5 (4.78)	110.7 (4.36)	132.6 (5.22)	149.4 (5.88)	131.9 (5.19)	168.0 (6.61)	154.2 (6.07)	115.5 (4.55)	114.5 (4.51)	1,582.2 (62.29)
Average precipitation days (≥ 1.0 mm)	10	10	9	9	8	9	10	9	10	10	8	9	111
Average relative humidity (%)	75.0	78.2	79.5	82.3	84.0	84.9	82.9	80.8	79.9	77.2	73.4	72.9	79.3
Source: Instituto Nacional de Meteorologia

== Economy ==
Firstly, agriculture was the only economic activity. The emergence of the footwear industry, and also of brickworks, were responsible for boosting the local economy. In the 70s, boosted by the footwear industry, the city received several immigrants from other regions of the state.

== Sports ==
The city's soccer team, Clube 15 de Novembro has a regional prominence, despite having closed its professional division in 2008 and again in 2013 after financial problems. The headquarters of this club resembles Germanic architecture. Currently, 15 de Novembro has departments for various sports like tennis, shooting, soccer academies, archery, handball and chess, in addition to the swimming pools department.

== Culture ==
The culture of the community is deeply linked to German colonization, the taste for singing, dancing and traditions brought from the distant homeland, gave rise to the societies Concórdia (Current 15 November), the Clube Recreativo e Cultural Oriente and Sociedade e Canto Progresso

The attachment to Rio Grande do Sul's traditions is also present through the rural rodeos carried out by the Gaucho Tradition Centers (in Portuguese: Centro de Tradições Gaúchas - CTG) Campo Verde, M'Bororé, Palanques da Tradição and Guapos do Itapuí.

The city has a theatre and two cinemas with modern infrastructure, at the Campo Bom Integrated Education Center (in Portuguese: Centro de Educação Integrada - C.E.I), where the bus station is also located. One of the movie theaters is named after the actress Bárbara Paz, who was born in Campo Bom.

The majority of the city's population is made up of German and Italian descendants, but there is also a minority of Portuguese, Spanish and Polish descendants. Alongside the national language, Portuguese, the German language is considered a cultural heritage of the city, protected by IPHAN since 2008.

== See also ==
- List of municipalities in Rio Grande do Sul
- Vale do Sinos Technology Park, VALETEC Park
