= Sinos River Valley =

Valley

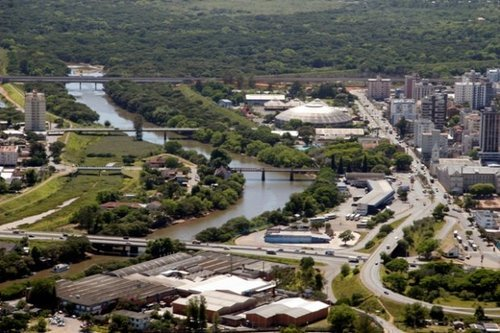
Sinos River Valley

The Sinos River Valley is situated northeast of the state of Rio Grande do Sul, Southern Brazil, covering two geomorphologic provinces: the Southern plateau and central depression, an area of almost 1398.5 km^{2}, consisting of 14 municipalities. The Sinos River Basin consists of up to 32 municipalities.

== Municipalities ==
- Araricá
- Canoas
- Campo Bom
- Dois Irmãos
- Estância Velha
- Esteio
- Ivoti
- Nova Hartz
- Nova Santa Rita
- Novo Hamburgo
- Portão
- São Leopoldo
- Sapiranga
- Sapucaia do Sul

== See also ==
- Vale do Sinos Technology Park, VALETEC Park
