= Ivoti =

Municipality of Rio Grande do Sul, Brazil

- Municipality
- Municipality of Ivoti
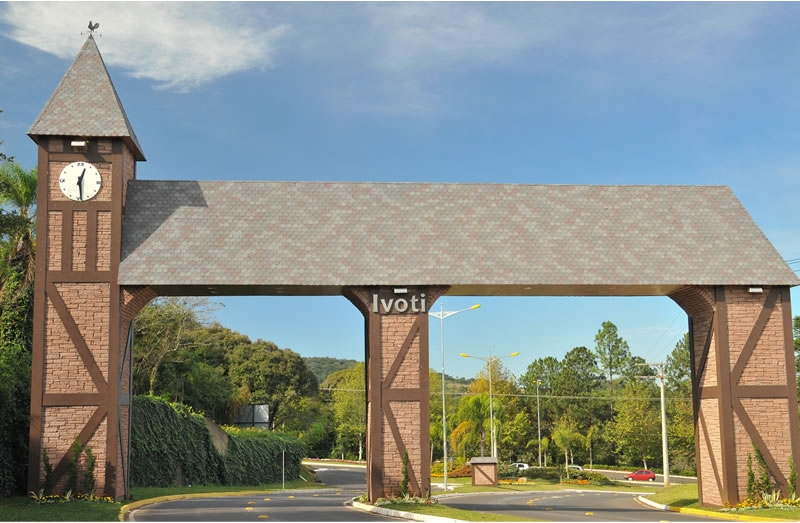
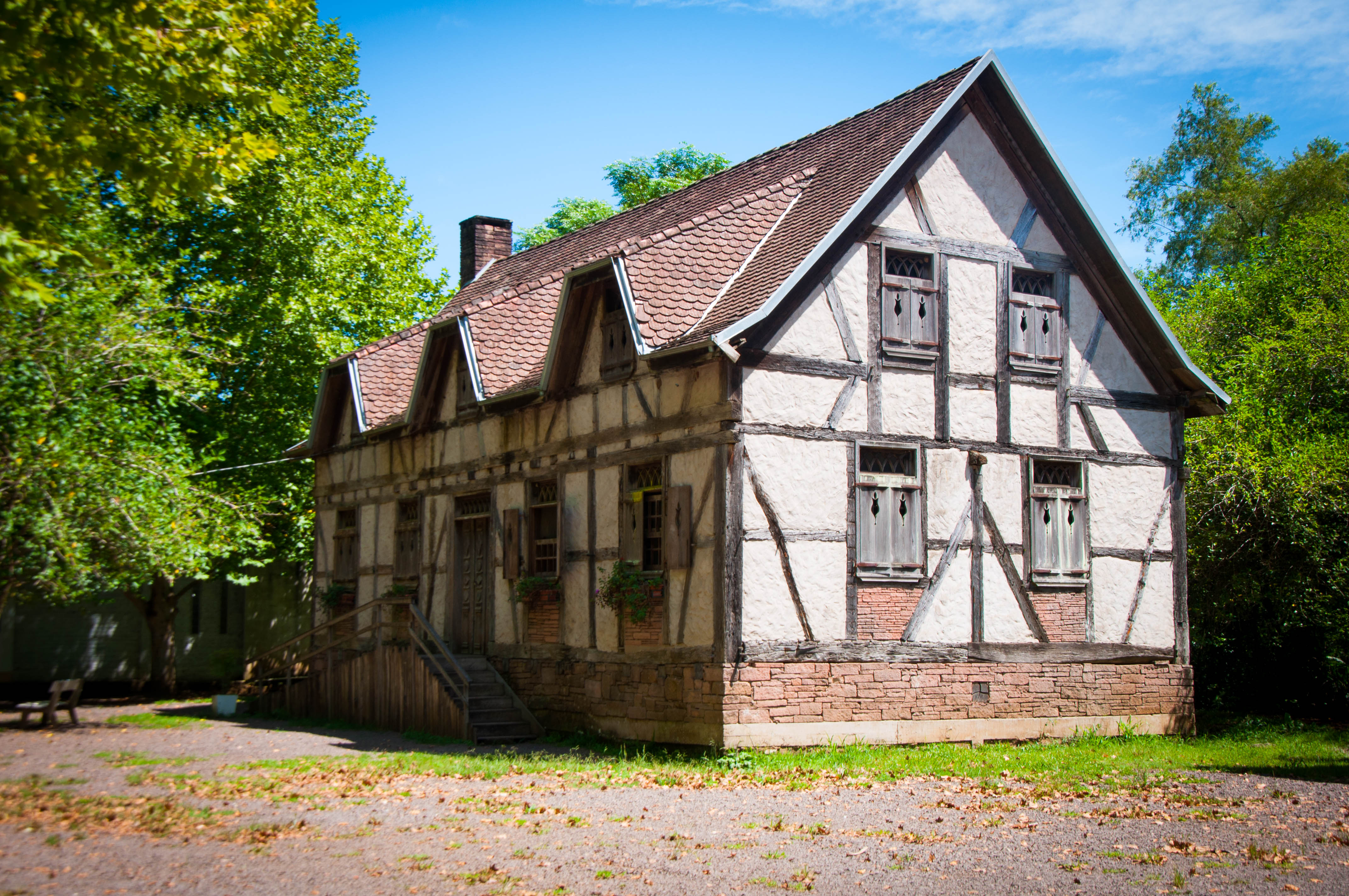
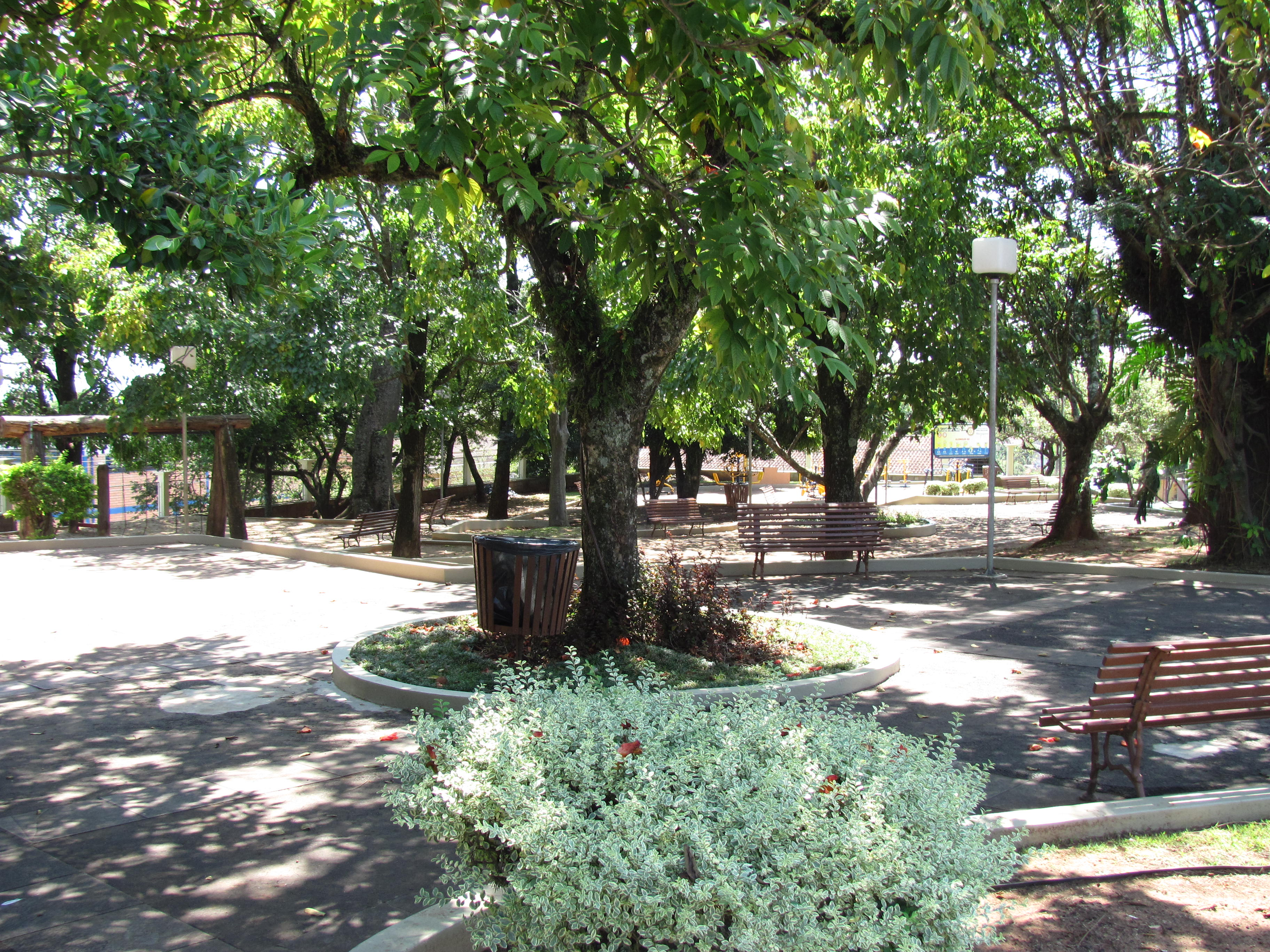
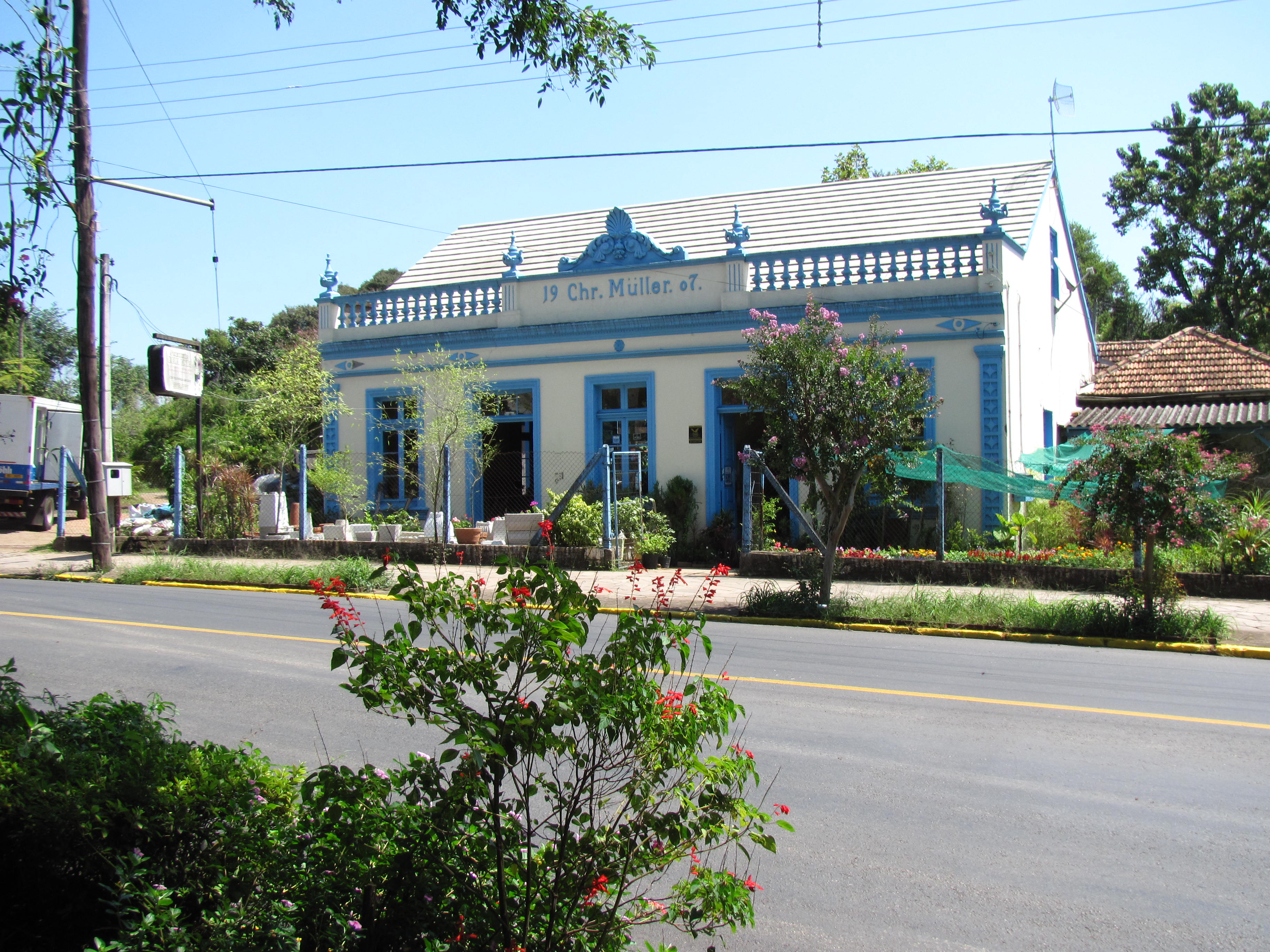
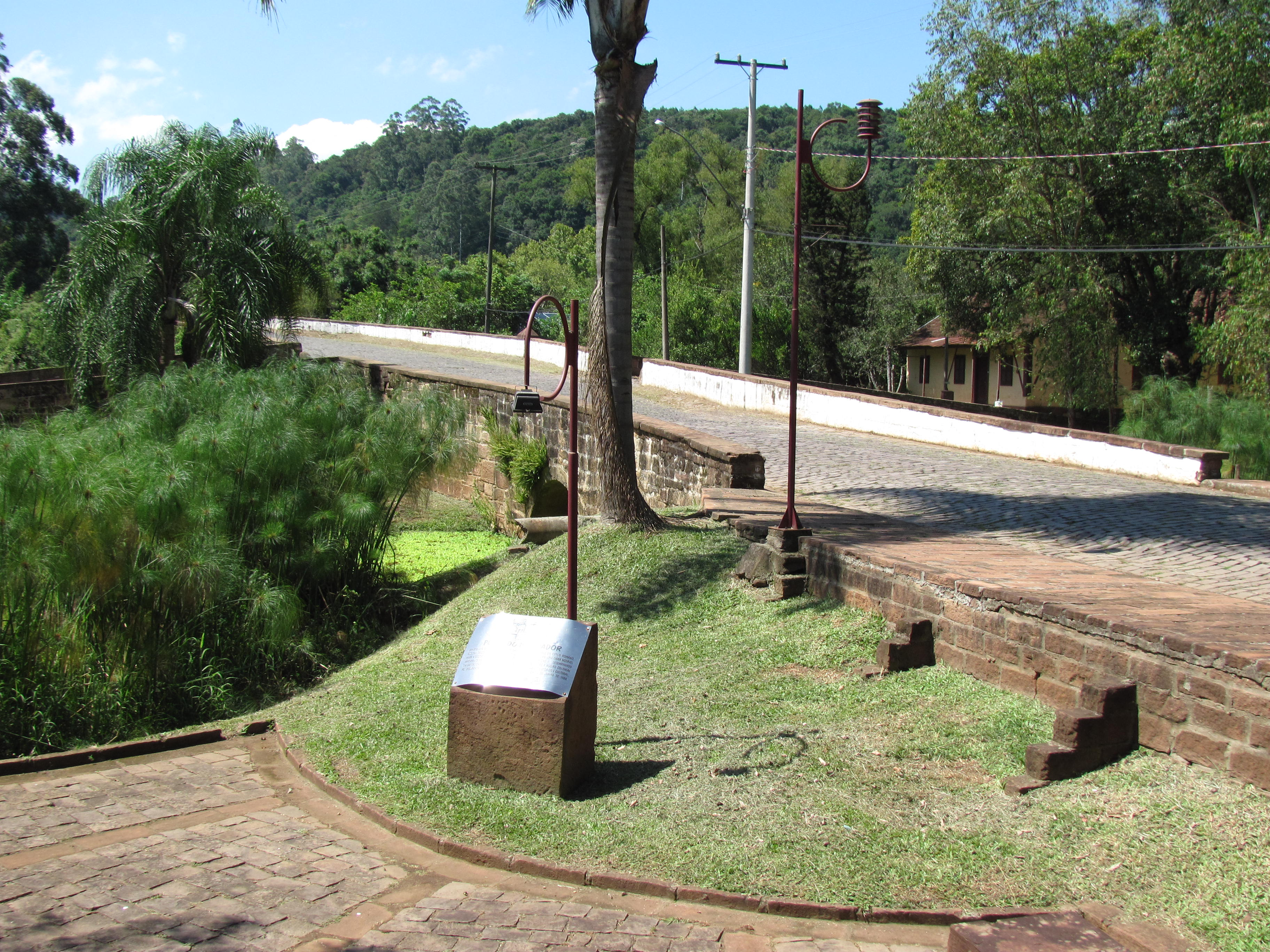
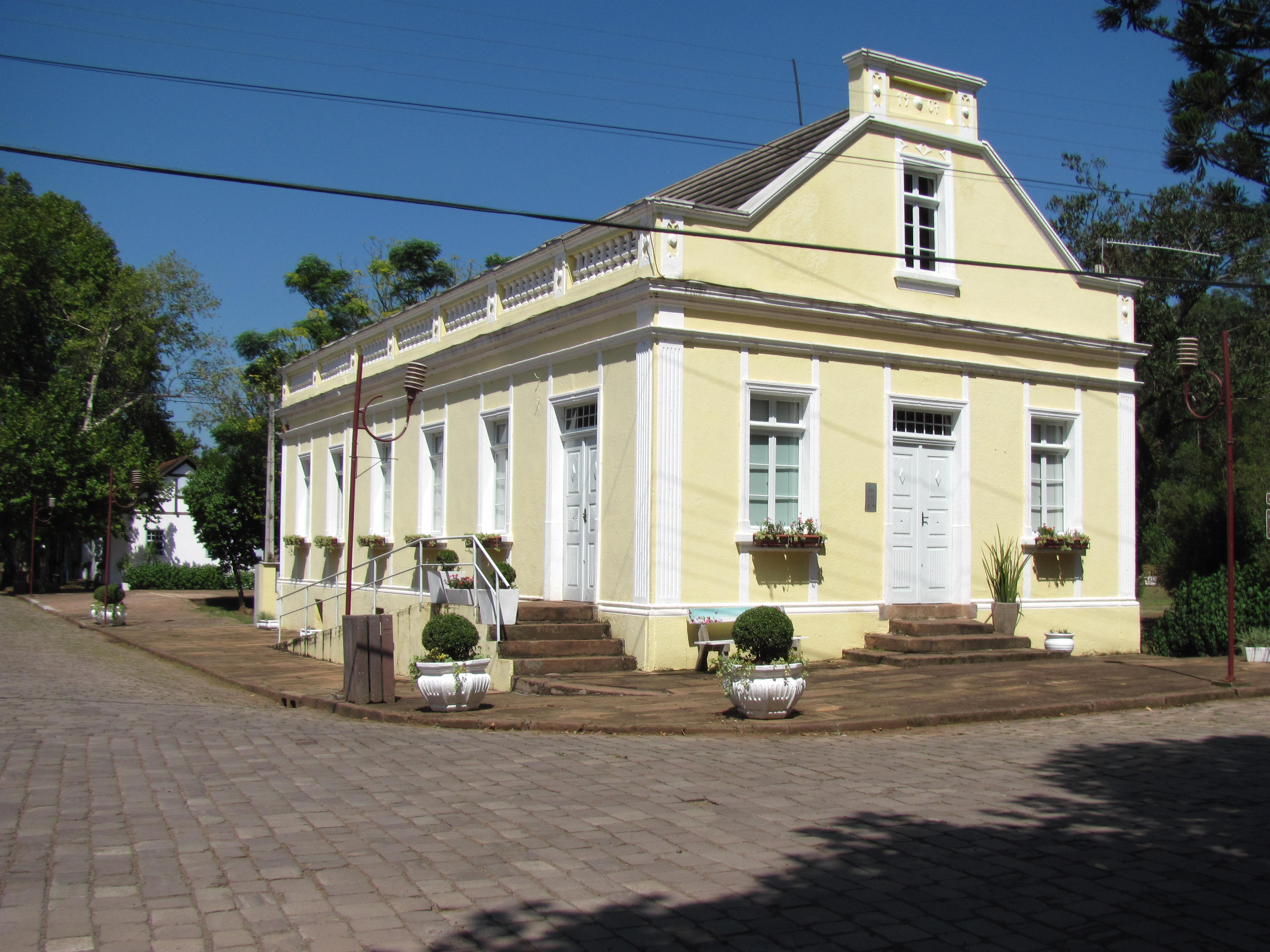

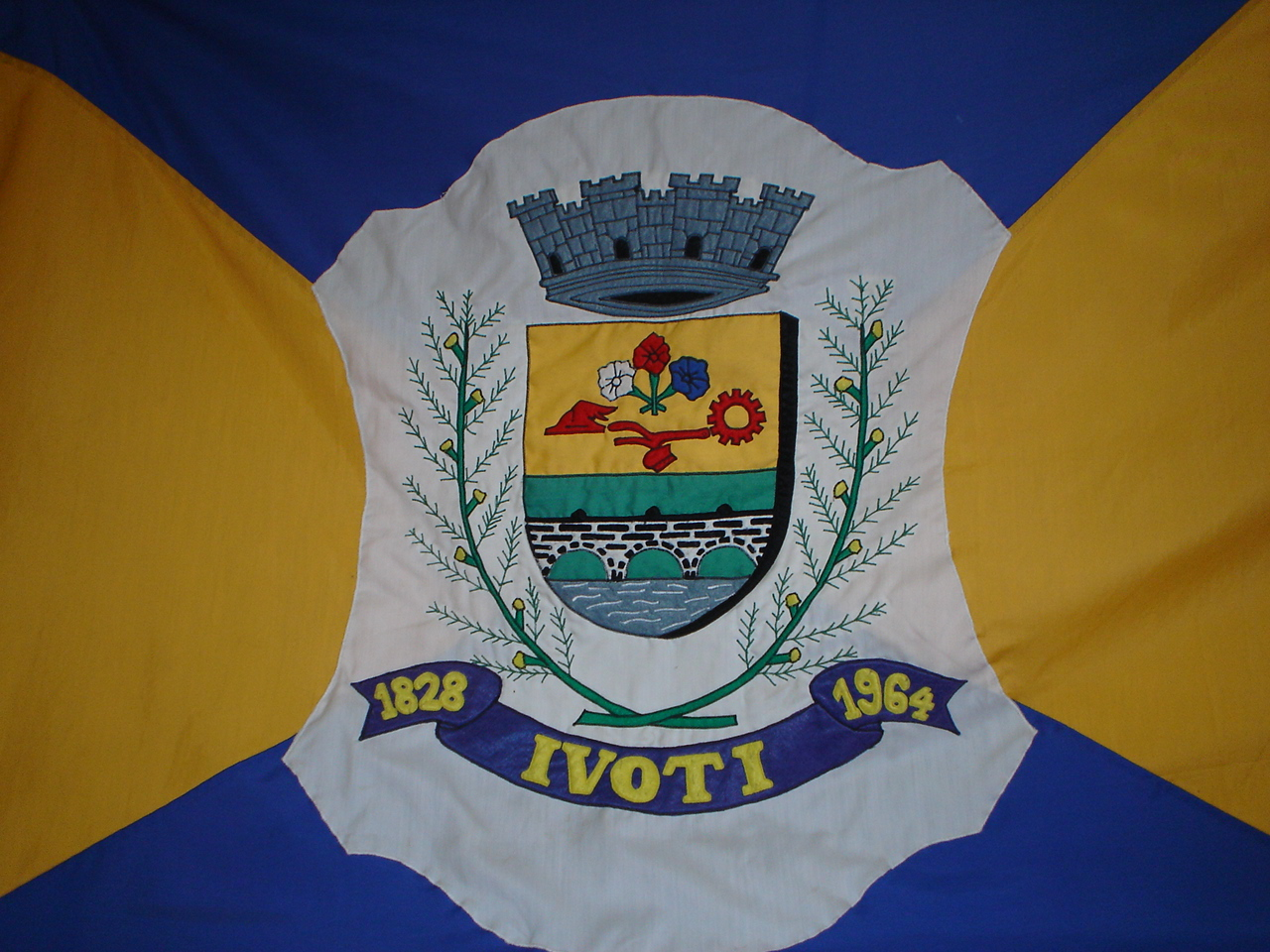
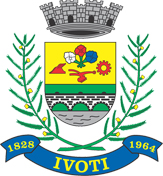
- Flag Coat of arms
- Nickname: City of the Flowers
- Location in Rio Grande do Sul
- Coordinates: 29°36′S 51°10′W
- Country: Brazil
- State: Rio Grande do Sul
- Mesoregion: Metropolitan Porto Alegre
- Microregion: Gramado-Canela
- Founded: 19 October 1964

Government
  - Mayor: Maria de Lourdes Bauermann

Area
  - Total: 63.15 km^{2} (24.38 sq mi)
- Elevation: 127 m (417 ft)

Population (2020)
  - Total: 24,690
  - Density: 391.0/km^{2} (1,013/sq mi)
- Time zone: UTC−3 (BRT)
- Postal code: 93900-000
- Area code: 51
- HDI (2010): 0.784 – high
- Website: ivoti.rs.gov.br

Ivoti is a municipality in the Brazilian state of Rio Grande do Sul, located in the Porto Alegre metropolitan area. The population is 24,690 (2020 est.) in an area of 63.15 km^{2}.

== History ==
Originally occupied by indigenous people since 12,000 years ago (known as the Umbu Tradition), the area started to be explored by bandeirantes in the 18th century and later was used as a route to transport cattle. The first Europeans to settle in the area were German immigrants that arrived in the Sinos River Valley in 1824, coming from the Rhine region in southwestern Germany.

The area encompassing Ivoti was originally known as Berghahnerschneiss (Bergahner's aisle) because members of the German family Berghahner were the first to settle in the area. After the provincial law number 635 from 4 November 1867, the area was officially named Bom Jardim (Portuguese for Good Garden) and constituted the third district of São Leopoldo.

The name Bom Jardim, chosen because the land was favourable for cultivating flowers, was changed by the law number 7.199 from 31 May 1938 to Ivoti, from Tupi-Guarani yvoty, meaning flower. For that reason, the city is currently nicknamed Cidade das Flores (Portuguese for City of the Flowers).

Ivoti received emancipation from São Leopoldo on 19 October 1964 when Governor Ildo Meneghetti signed the law number 4.798, creating the municipality of Ivoti.

On 20 March 1992, Ivoti lost part of its area after the emancipation of two of its districts, which became the municipalities of Lindolfo Collor and Presidente Lucena.

=== Mayors ===
Since its emancipation, Ivoti had the following mayors:

- 1965 – 1969: Neldo Holler
- 1969 – 1973: Egon Schneck
- 1973 – 1977: Neldo Holler
- 1977 – 1982: Flávio Klein
- 1983 – 1988: Arno Henrique Mueller
- 1989 – 1992: Arnaldo Kney
- 1993 – 1996: Paulo Gaspar Buchmann
- 1997 – 2000: Arnaldo Kney
- 2001 – 2004: Arnaldo Kney
- 2004 – 2008: Maria de Lourdes Bauermann
- 2009 – 2012: Maria de Lourdes Bauermann
- 2013 – 2016: Arnaldo Kney
- 2017 – 2020: Martin Cesar Kalkmann
- 2021 – 2024: Martin Cesar Kalkmann

== See also ==
- List of municipalities in Rio Grande do Sul
