= Café tropeiro =

Brazilian coffee drink

- Type: Beverage
- Place of origin: State of Brazil
- Associated cuisine: Tropeiro cuisine
- Serving temperature: Hot
- Main ingredients: Coffee powder, water

Café tropeiro, also known as café carreteiro, café de cambona, café de chaleira, café assustado, or café de campanha, is a Brazilian coffee typical from the tropeiro cuisine, where the coffee powder is added directly to the water and decanted with ember.

== History ==
Café tropeiro is part of the tropeiro cuisine, introduced by the tropeiros in the State of Brazil up until the Empire of Brazil in the XVII and XVIII centuries during their travels to transport merchandise. The coffee was born out of the necessity of preparing the drink anywhere, without items that could hardly be obtained outside of big cities.

The coffee became a traditional food in many parts of Brazil, such as Paraíba Valley, Lapa, Castro, and Tibagi. In Lapa, the coffee is drunk in café com mistura, a meal consisting of bread, jam, pâté, cold cuts, sausages, juice, tea and coffee.

== Preparation ==
Café tropeiro has the same preparation method as "café muçulmano" (Muslim coffee). It is traditionally prepared in a cambona, a type of kettle, or in any other recipient, without a filter. The coffee powder, traditionally ground from black grain, is added directly to the water, that must be stirred to avoid the creation of coffee grounds. After boiling, the coffee is stirred with a stick with ember on its tip to help the powder decant in the bottom of the recipient.
