= Nova Petrópolis =

Municipality of Rio Grande do Sul, Brazil

- Municipality
- Municipality of Nova Petrópolis
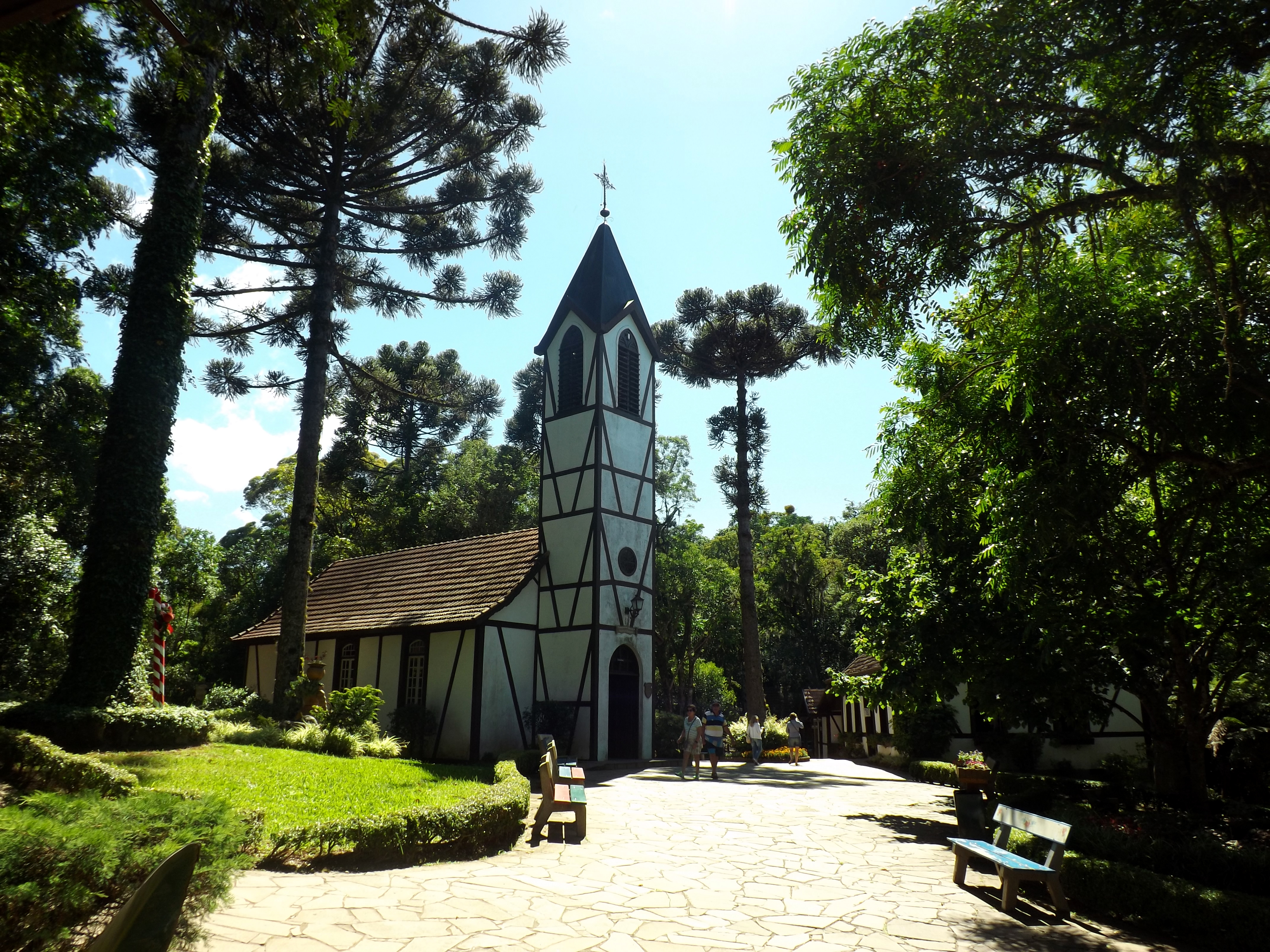
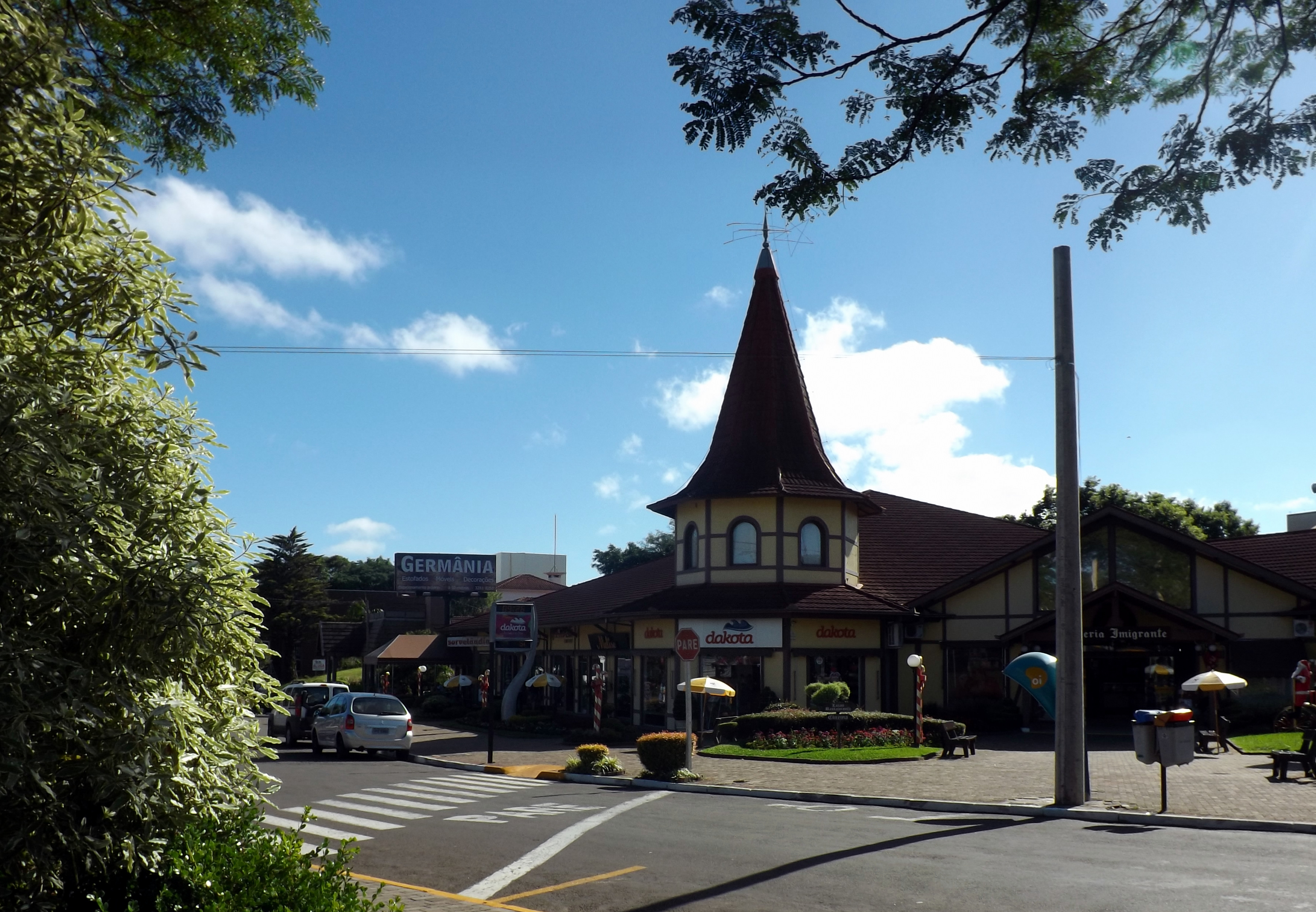
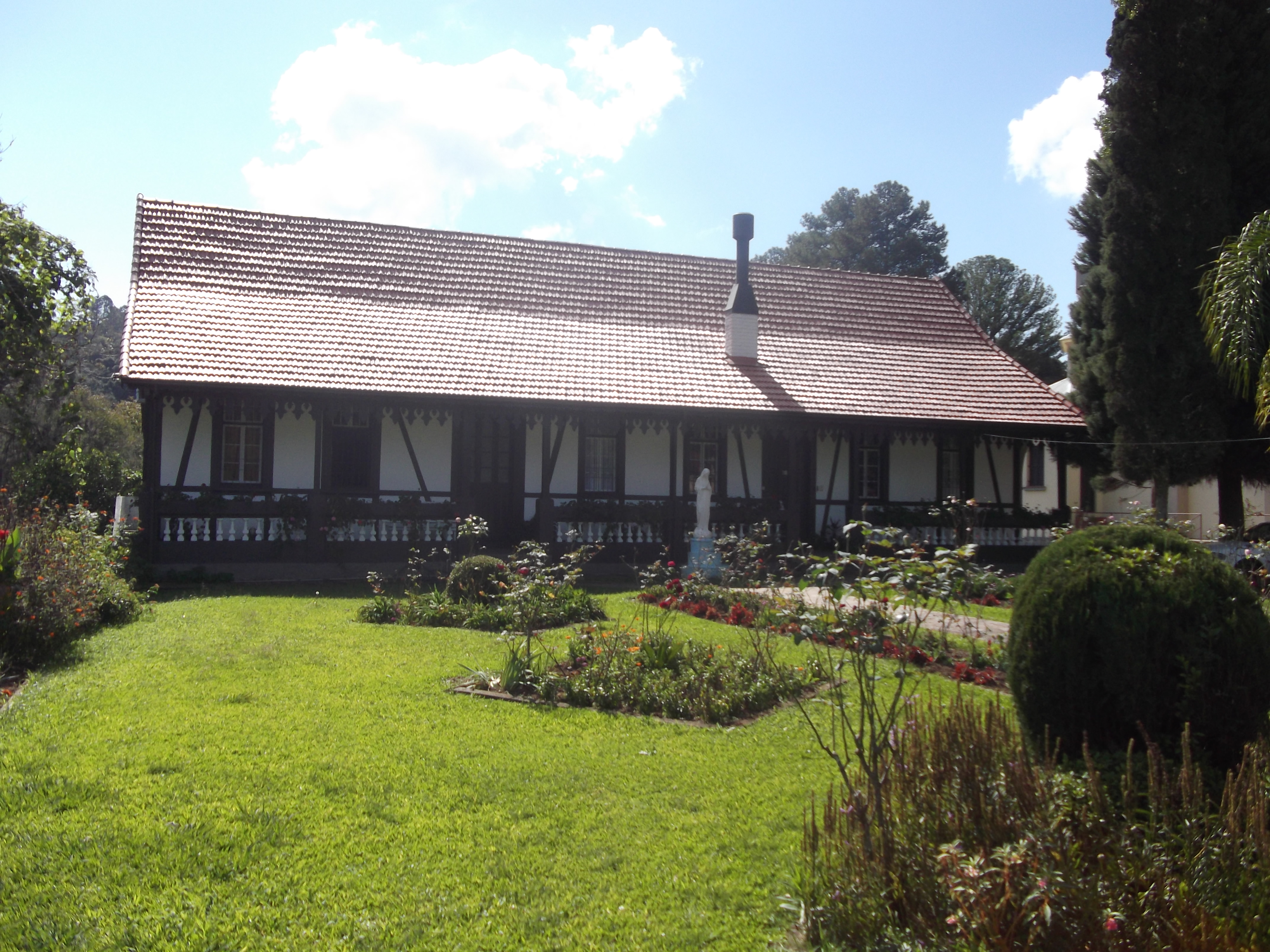
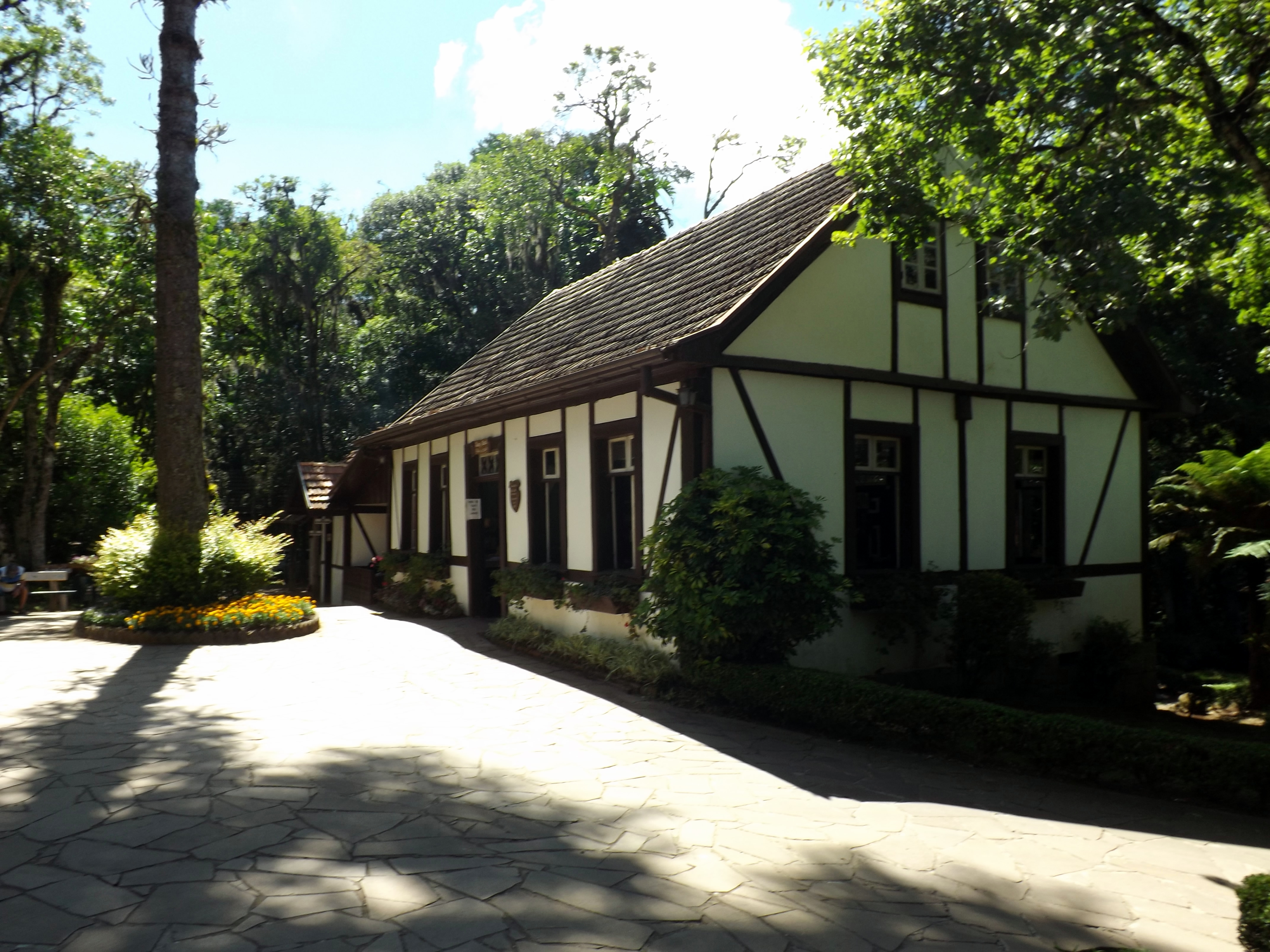
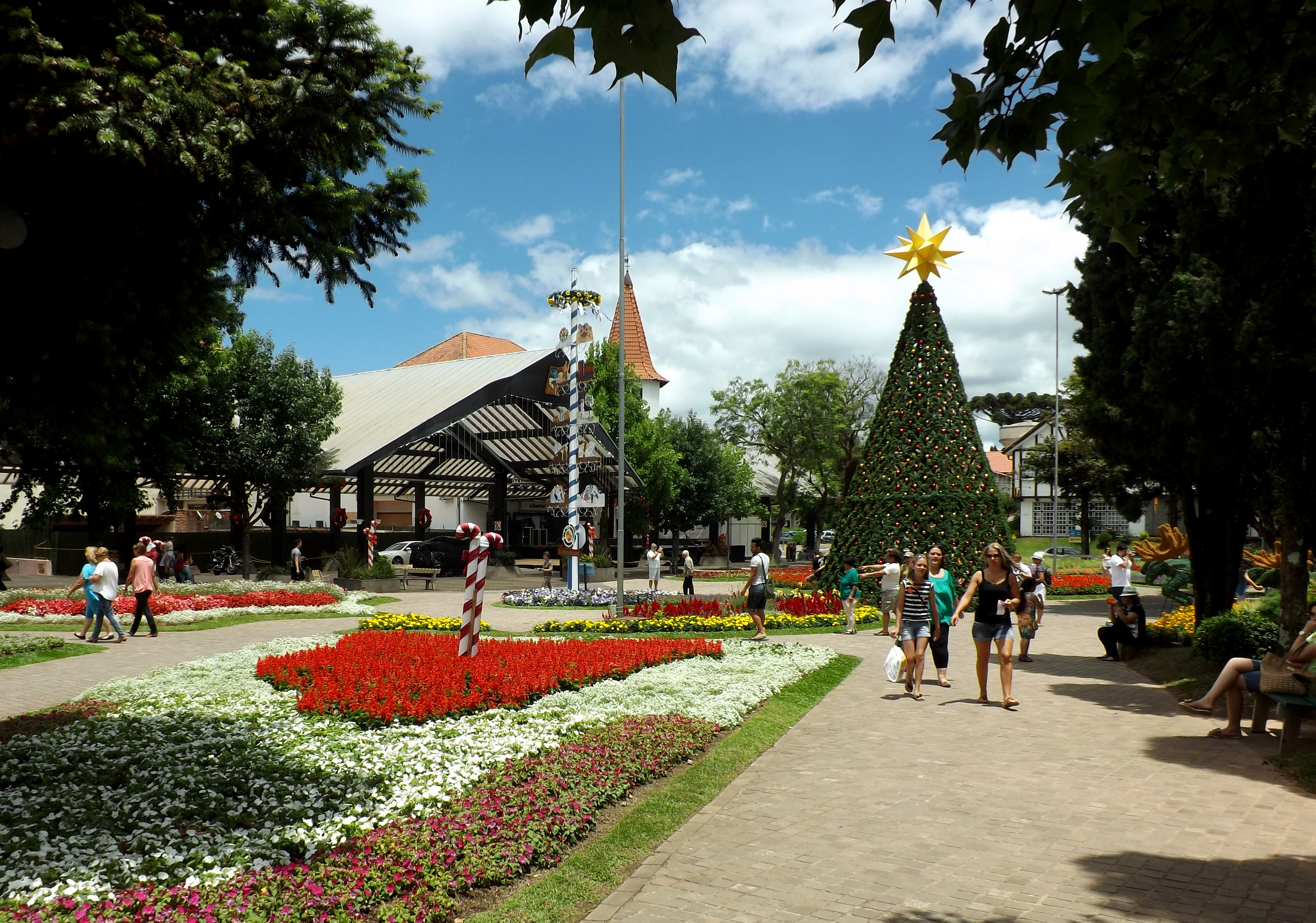
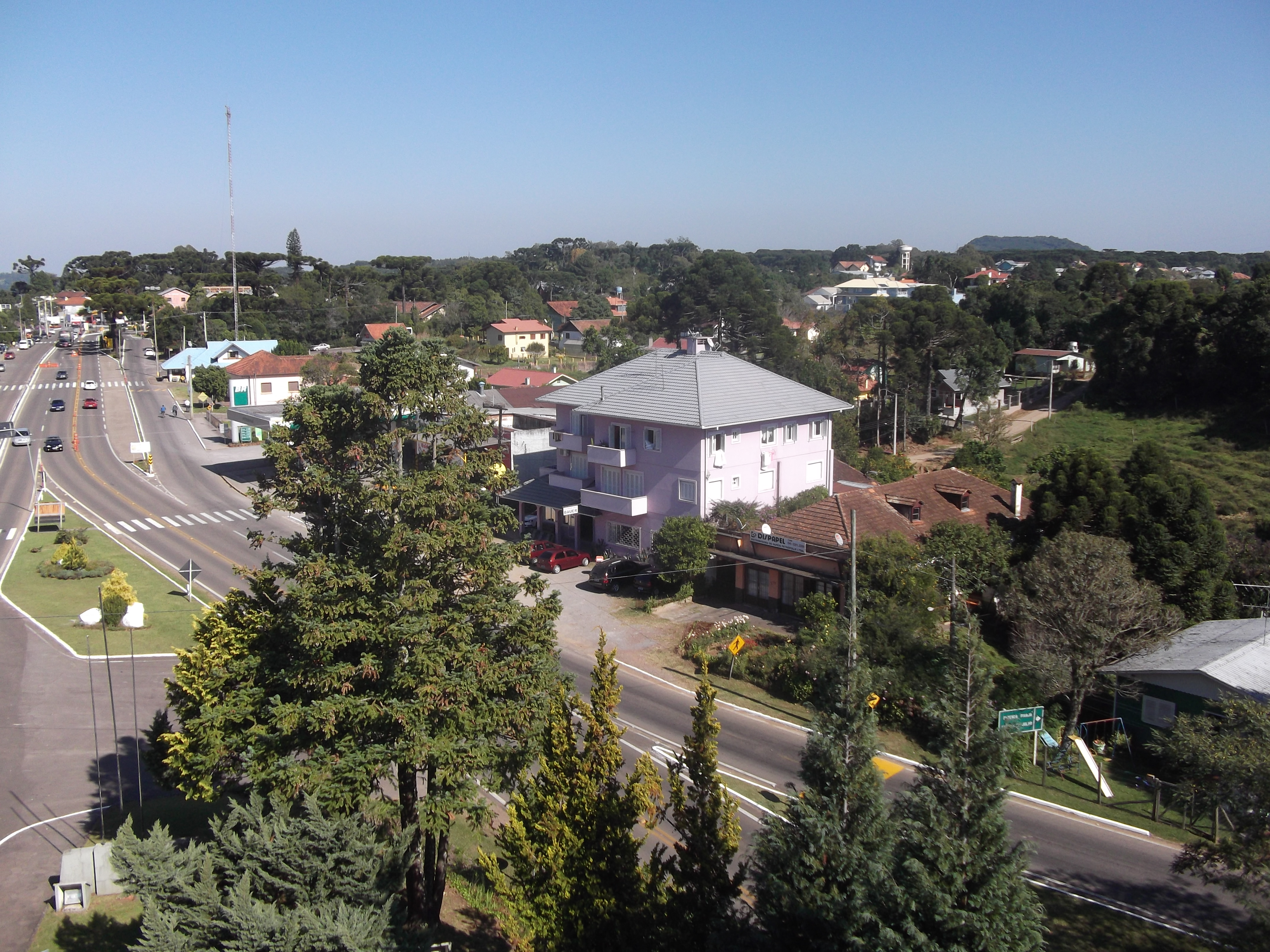

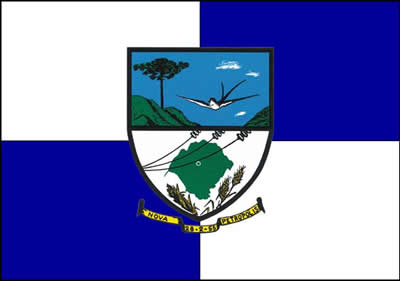
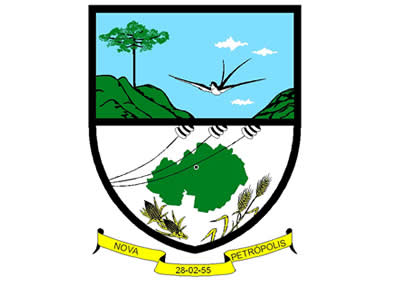
- Flag Coat of arms
- Motto: Jardim da Serra Gaúcha (Garden of Serra Gaúcha)
- Coordinates: 29.367°S 51.100°W
- Country: Brazil
- State: Rio Grande do Sul

Government
  - Mayor: Régis Luiz Hahn

Area
  - Total: 291.079 km^{2} (112.386 sq mi)
- Elevation: 563 m (1,847 ft)

Population (2020)
  - Total: 21,536
  - Density: 73.987/km^{2} (191.62/sq mi)
- Time zone: UTC−3 (BRT)
- HDI (2010): 0.780 – high
- Website: novapetropolis.rs.gov.br

Nova Petrópolis is a municipality in the Southern Brazilian state of Rio Grande do Sul. The main seat of the municipality is also called Nova Petrópolis. It is located in the Serra Gaúcha region, at 29º22'35" South, 51º06'52" West, about 90 km (56 mi) north of Porto Alegre, the state capital city. Nova Petrópolis is situated at an average altitude of 580 m (1,900 ft) above sea level and covers an area of 293 km^{2} (113 sq mi).

== Settlement ==
The population of the municipality is around 20,000 people, and the majority of the natives are descendants of German-Brazilian immigrants. The German language or Riograndenser Hunsrückisch is still widely spoken in the municipality. Tourism is the main economic activity, followed by the manufacture of wool garments, dairy farming and shoemaking. Nova Petrópolis is one of the towns along the Serra Gaúcha scenic route known as Rota Romântica. The town is also part of the scenic Região das Hortênsias. Some known towns near Nova Petrópolis are Caxias do Sul, Novo Hamburgo, São Leopoldo, Feliz, Gramado, Canela.

== Attractions ==
Nova Petropolis is mainly a historical town, but there are several tourist shops and a maze. There are several rural hostels that are a combination of farms and lodgings where horse riding is one of their most characteristic attractions. There are also several restaurants.The city is also the home of the famous Ninho das Águias Mountain Peak which is a local attraction that draws thousands of visitors monthly. The peak has one of the most beautiful views in Southern Brazil. There is no cost to enter and it is a family welcoming location.

== Climate ==
This city is characterised as oceanic climate (Köppen: Cfb), frost is common in winter, snow may occur in winter, but it is uncommon.

== See also ==
- List of municipalities in Rio Grande do Sul
