= Vale do Sinos Technology Park, VALETEC Park =

The Vale do Sinos Technology Park, usually referred to as Valetec Park, is a science and technology park in Rio Grande do Sul, Brazil. It is one of 3 parks of this sort in the state.

In 2015 there were 18 companies installed inside the park as well as 60 other associate companies.

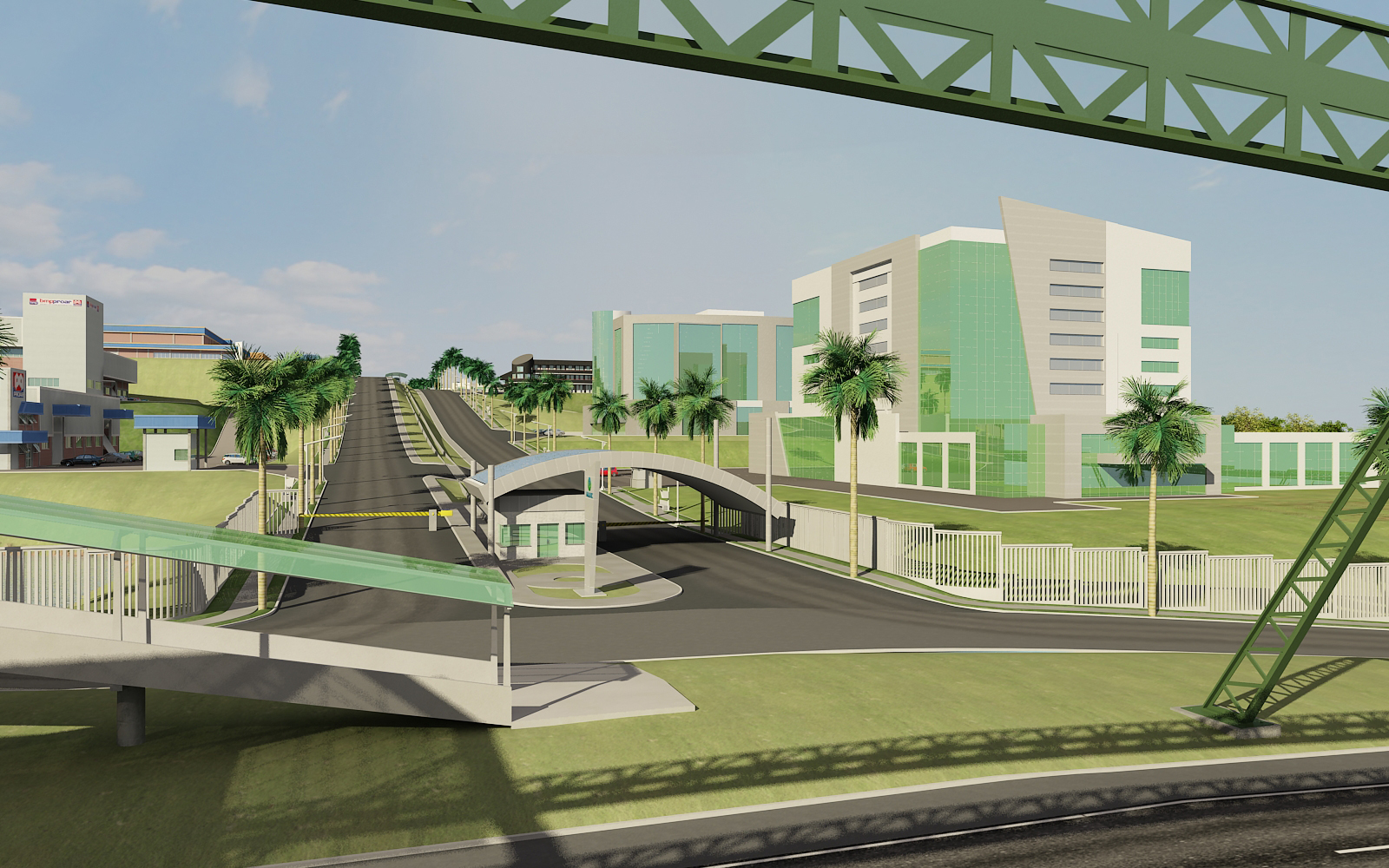
Valetec Park

== Background ==
The Vale do Sinos Regional Development Association (Valetec) was established in 1998 as a non-profit private civil partnership at the Sinos River Valley in southern Brazil. Its goal is to promote technological development in the Vale do Sinos region by stimulating regional integration, providing incentives for entrepreneurship, while creating, attracting, hosting, and developing companies.
