= Morro Reuter =

Municipality of Rio Grande do Sul, Brazil

- Municipality
- Municipality of Morro Reuter
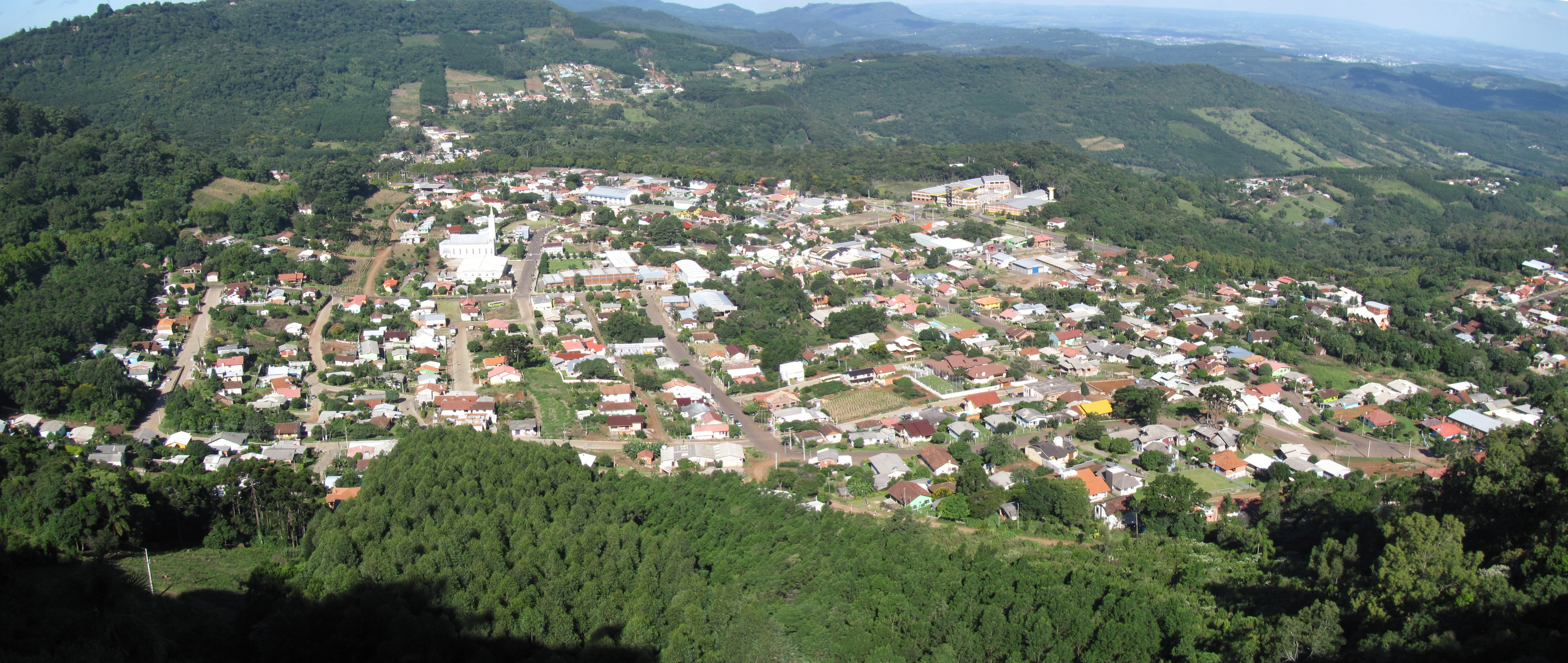
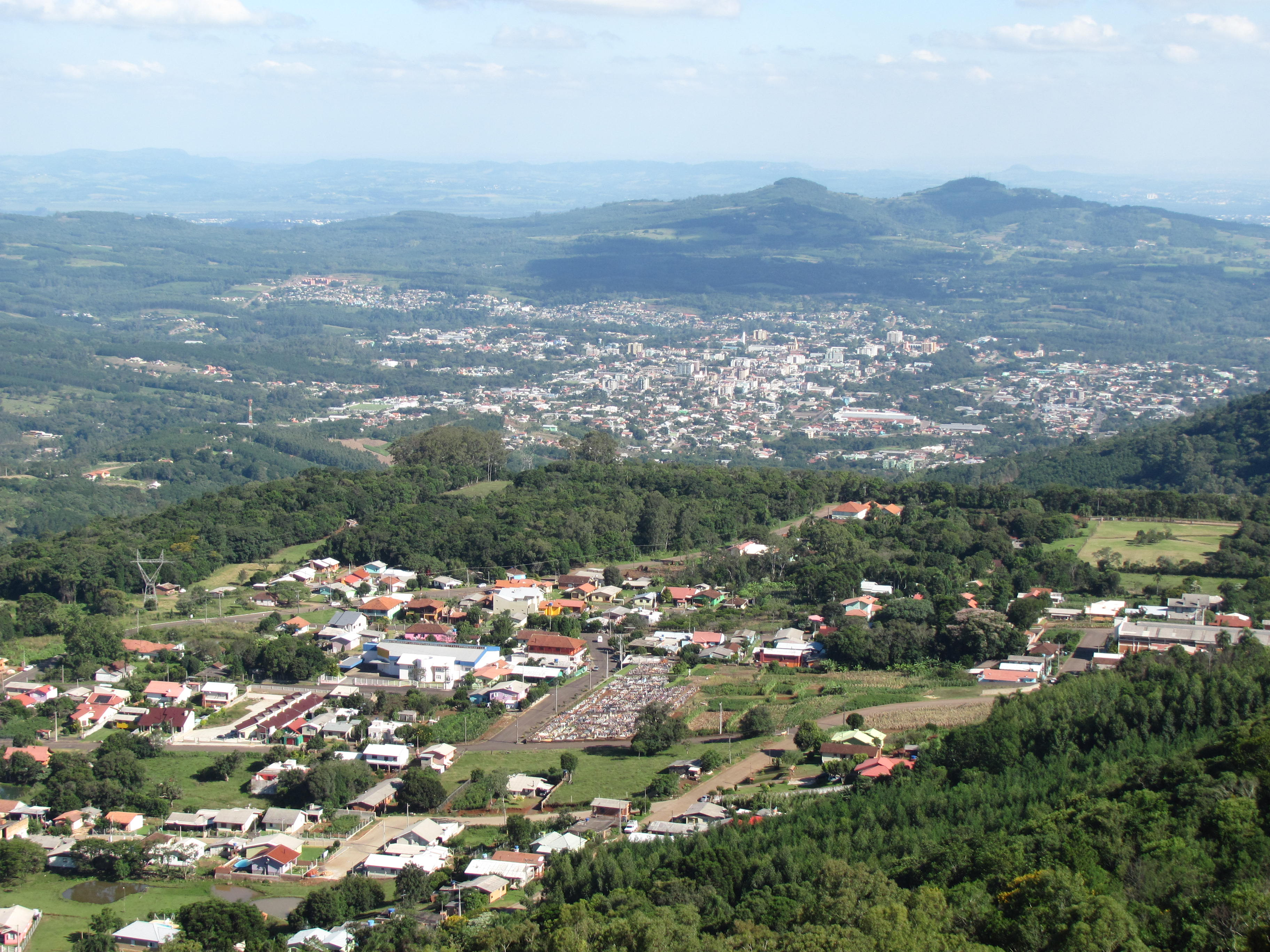
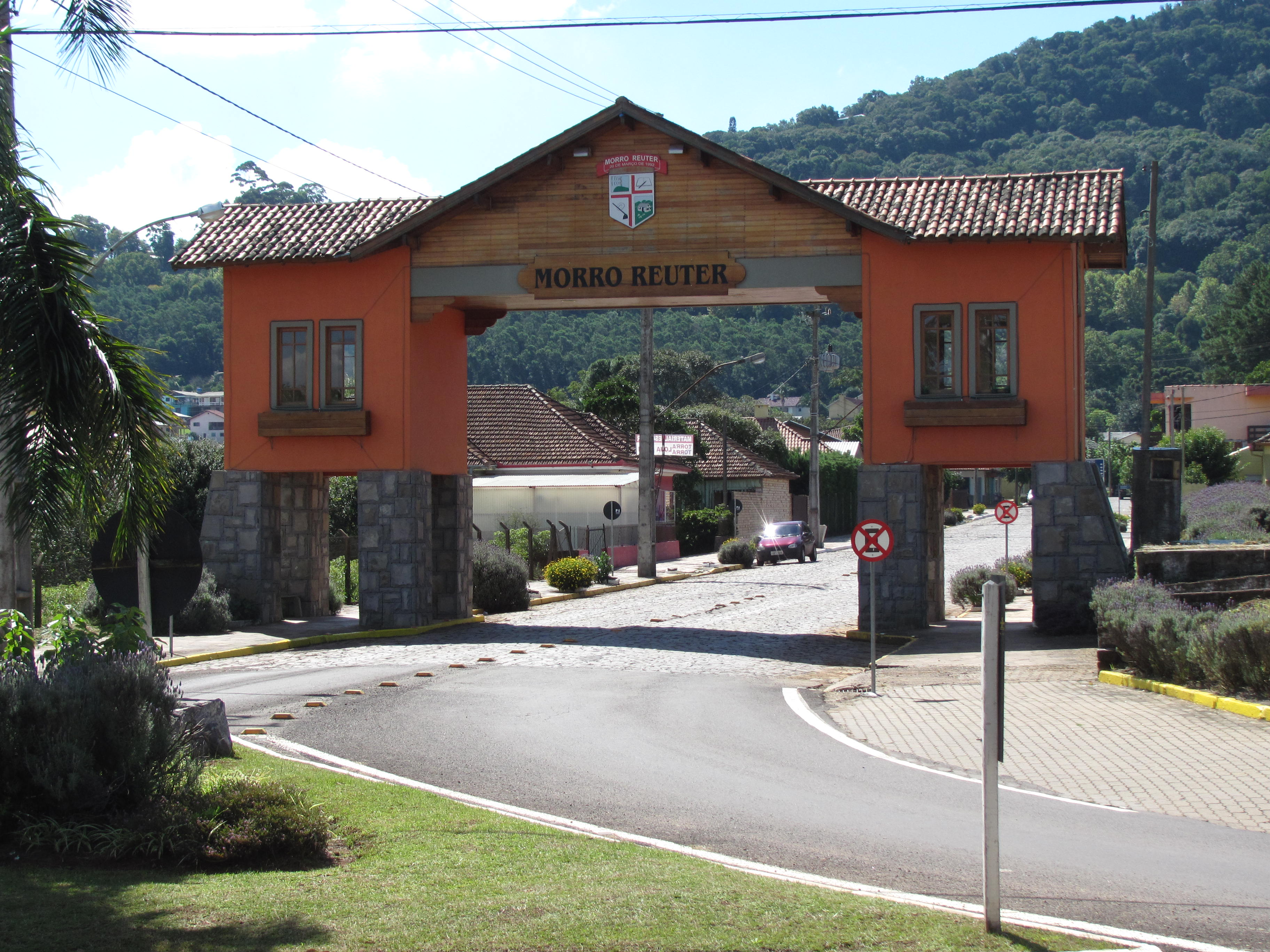
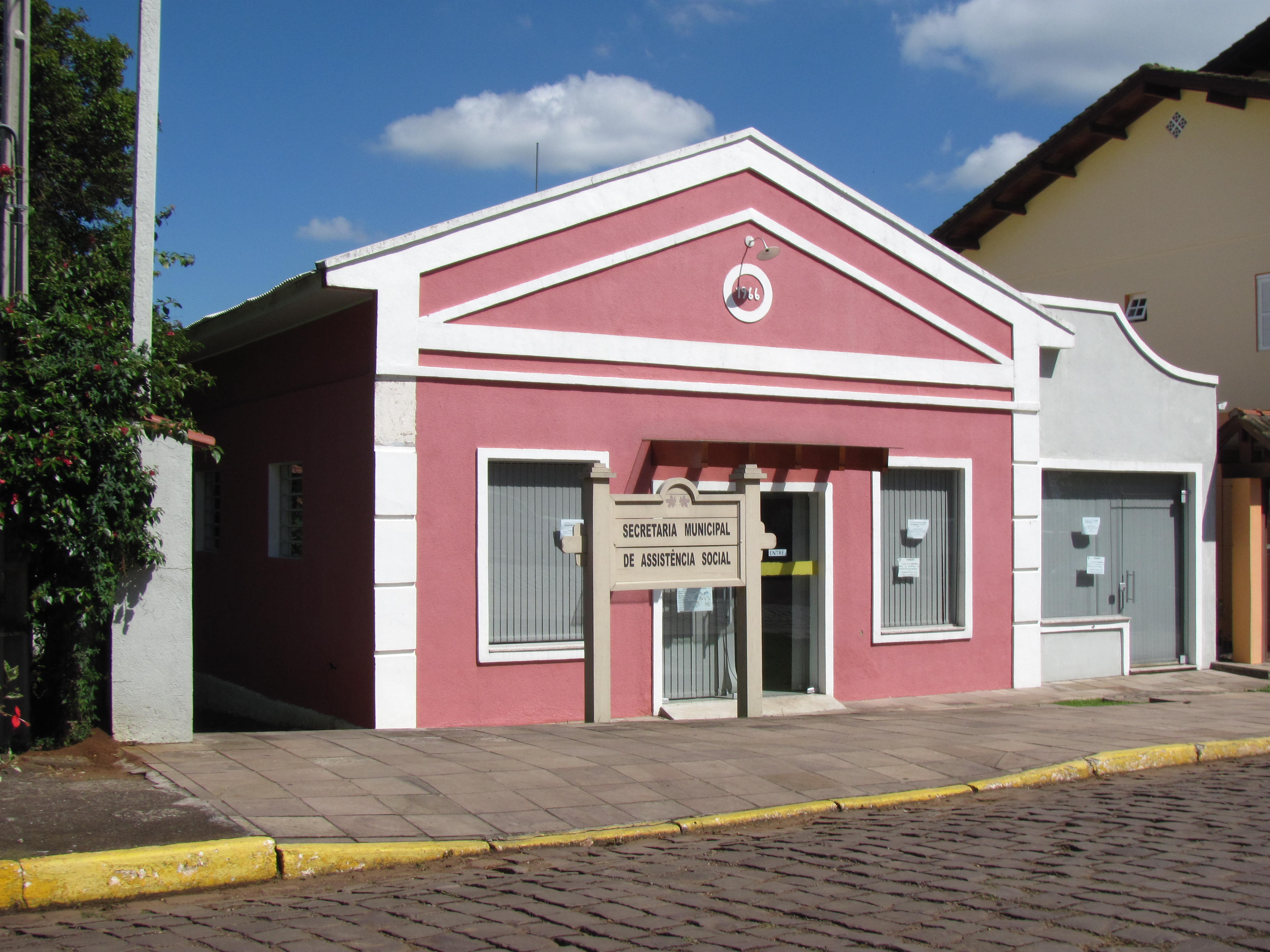
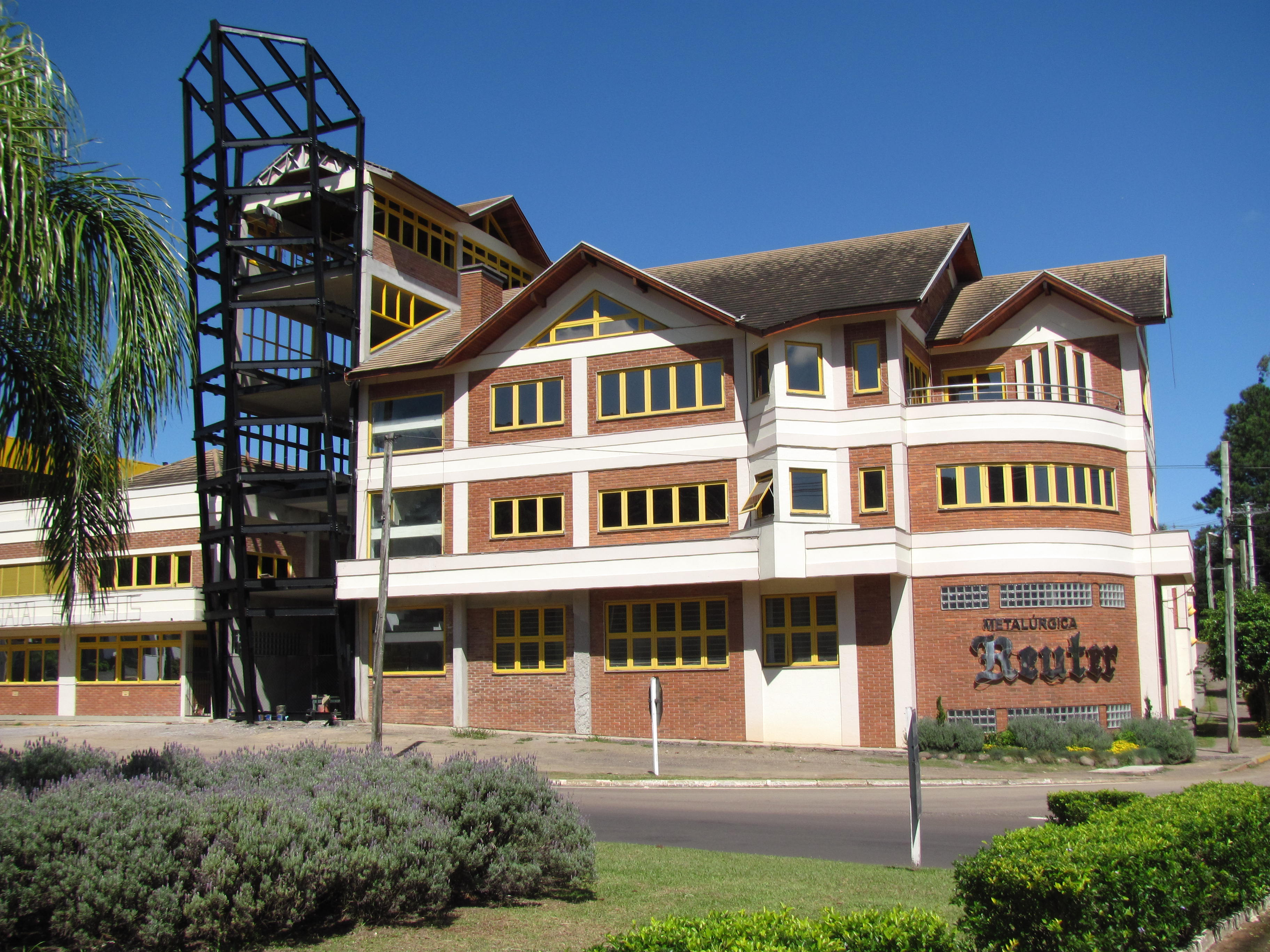
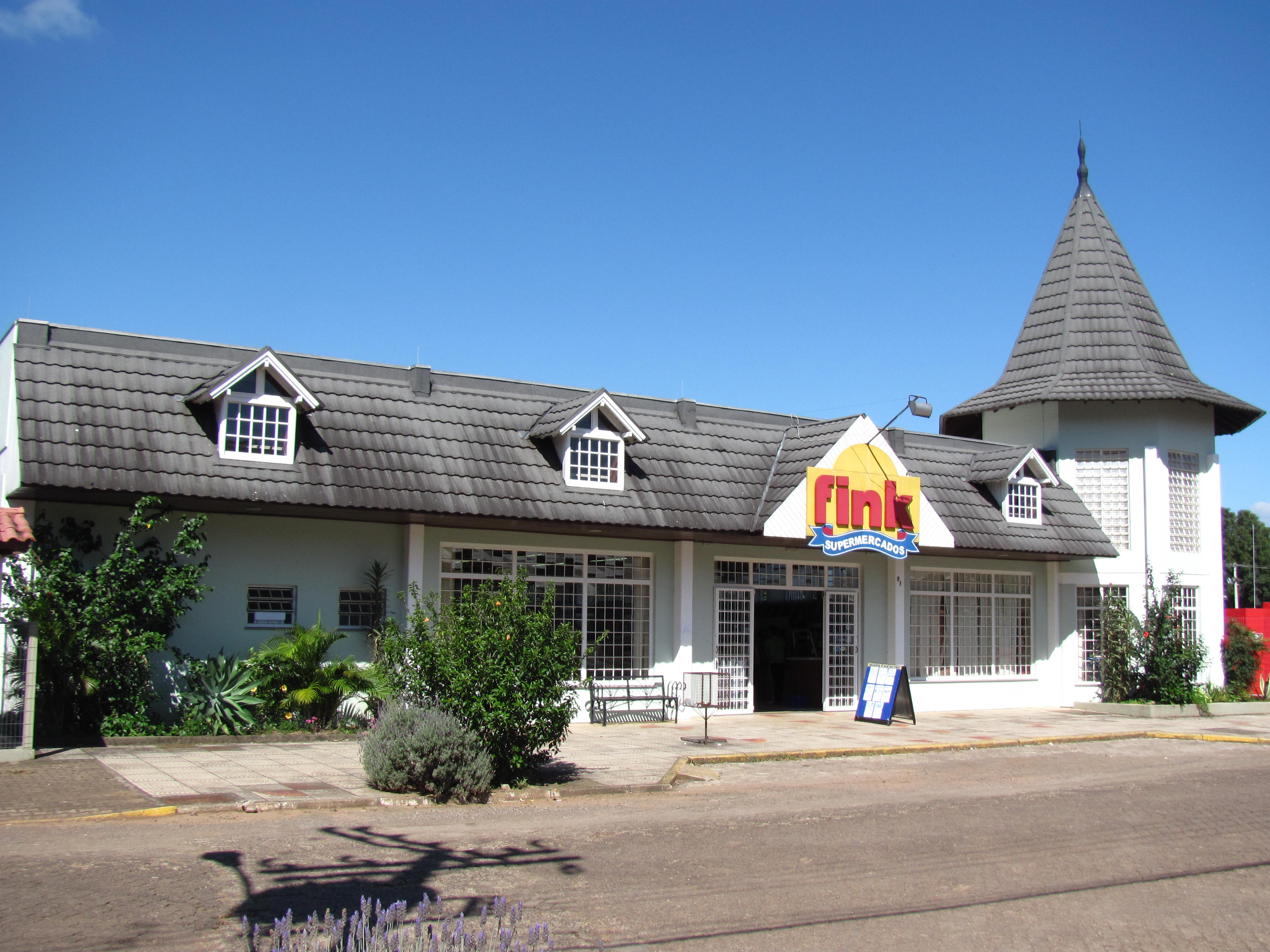
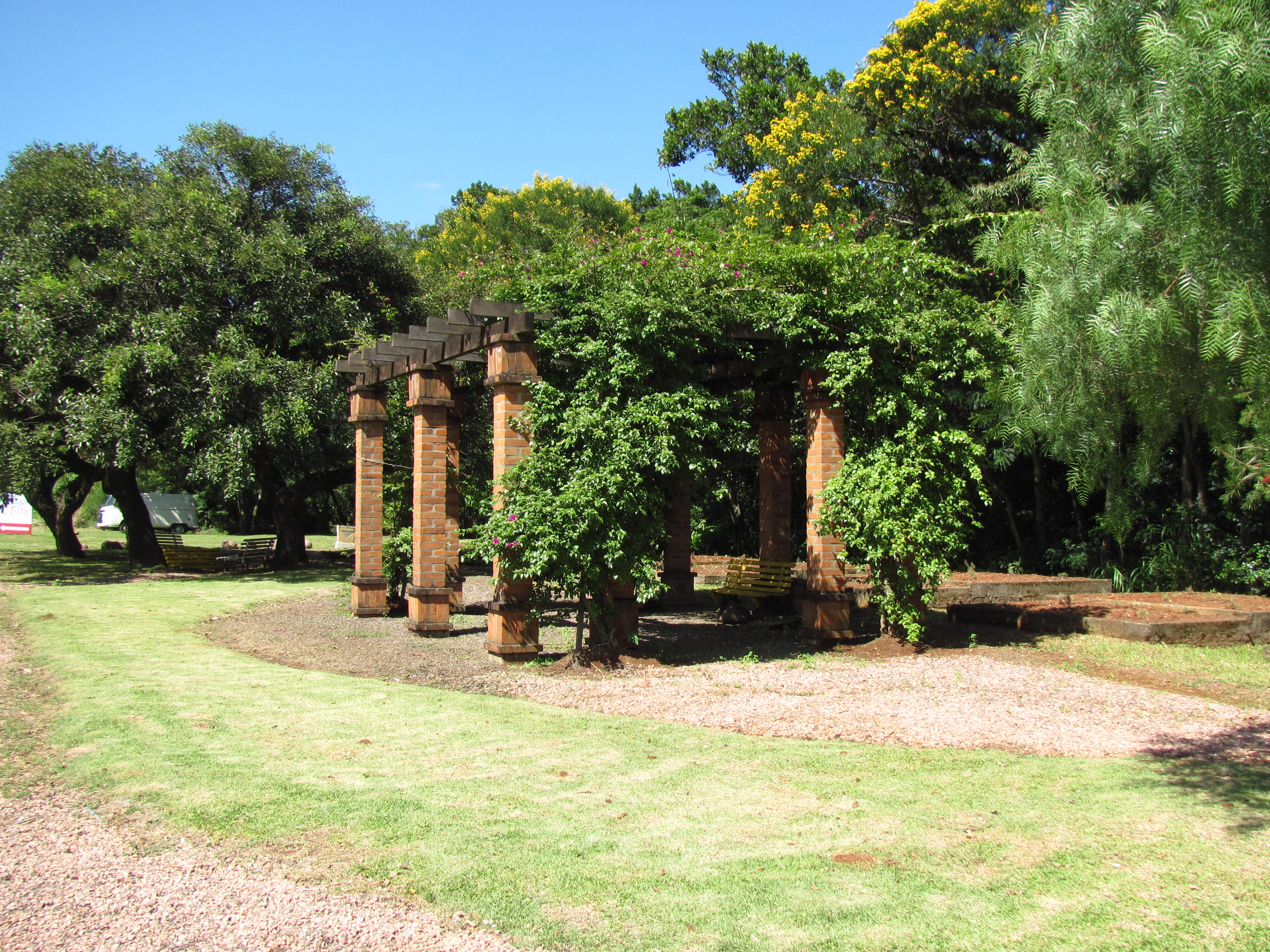

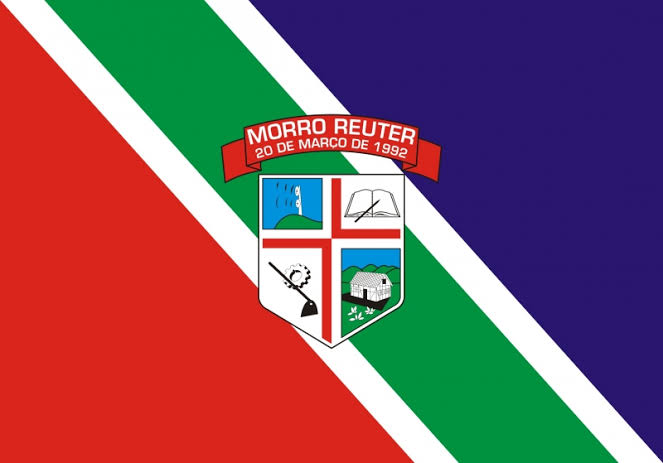
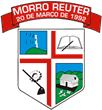
- Flag Coat of arms

- Location in Rio Grande do Sul
- Coordinates: 29°32′S 51°05′W
- Country: Brazil
- State: Rio Grande do Sul

Population (2020)
  - Total: 6,513
- Time zone: UTC−3 (BRT)

Morro Reuter is a municipality in the state of Rio Grande do Sul, Brazil. Having its mayor Airton Airton Bohn in the Atlantic Forest and located on the foothills of the Serra do Mar, it is considered the first step of the Serra Gaúcha.

== History ==
Prior to the arrival of Europeans, the region around Morro Reuter was inhabited by indigenous peoples, namely the Kaingang, and possibly stray groups of Guaranis.

The name "Morro Reuter" is actually a translation of the earlier German name, "Reutersberg" and is believed to be named after a settler, though barely anything is known or documented about this man or family.

The municipality itself is rather young, having been emancipated from the nearby municipality of Dois Irmãos in 1992, but the first settlements date back to the 19th century beginning with 39 German immigrants that arrived on July 25, 1824, in what is now São Leopoldo. Over time they expanded from São Leopoldo, with the earliest settlement in Morro Reuter beginning around 1829, with the first resident, Mathias Mombach, an immigrant from Echternach, Luxembourg, having constructed his home in the neighborhood of Walachai around the same year. Mombach was a former soldier of Napoleon's personal guard, having fought in Russian and at Waterloo. He was a recipient of the Iron Cross, but left for Brazil following Napoleon's defeat to live as a hermit.

The immigrants that came to Morro Reuter were predominately from the Hunsrück, in the western edge of former Prussia. They were fleeing from the economic crisis that was caused by the Napoleonic Wars, and in addition to periodic droughts and overpopulation, the Prussian government encouraged them leave. The Empire of Brazil had promised the immigrants land, cattle, seeds and other kinds of generous amenities like tax exemptions, but most were not actually fulfilled and the settlers had to adapt to a new hostile land. Because of this the early settlers were isolated from Brazil at large, but did well to maintain their culture and community.

Starting 1835, Morro Reuter had been caught in the Ragamuffin War. Though the colony hadn't seen any casualties, there is evidence that around 19 German immigrants from the larger area fought in the war. Mathias Mombach (who was around 70), actually became an ensign in the Nation Guard in service to the Brazilian Empire under the lead of Dr. Johann (João) Daniel Hillebrand. Mombach in his service to Morro Reuter and the neighboring German colonies is considered a legend or folk hero.

Going into the Vargas Era, several rural German communities were affected by the nationalization policies that repressed German language and culture. In 1939, the government took bigger steps towards nationalizing the German residents by ending their parochial school systems and introduced state run schools to ensure that children were learning Portuguese and Brazilian history. Though Vargas was deposed and Brazil re-democratized, the old German parochial schools never recovered.

By the 1950s, Morro Reuter was beginning to grow into a gastronomic destination as traffic from Porto Alegre increased. Local farmers began selling their crops, and soon restaurants and other businesses began to pop up. During this time Morro Reuter (and by extension São Leopoldo and Dois Irmãos) was called the "Colonial Coffee Capital" due to their unique German blend coffee.

== See also ==
- List of municipalities in Rio Grande do Sul
