= Região das Hortênsias =

Tourist destination in Rio Grande do Sul, Brazil

Blue hortênsia (in English hydrangea) flowers in the Região das Hortênsias in Rio Grande do Sul

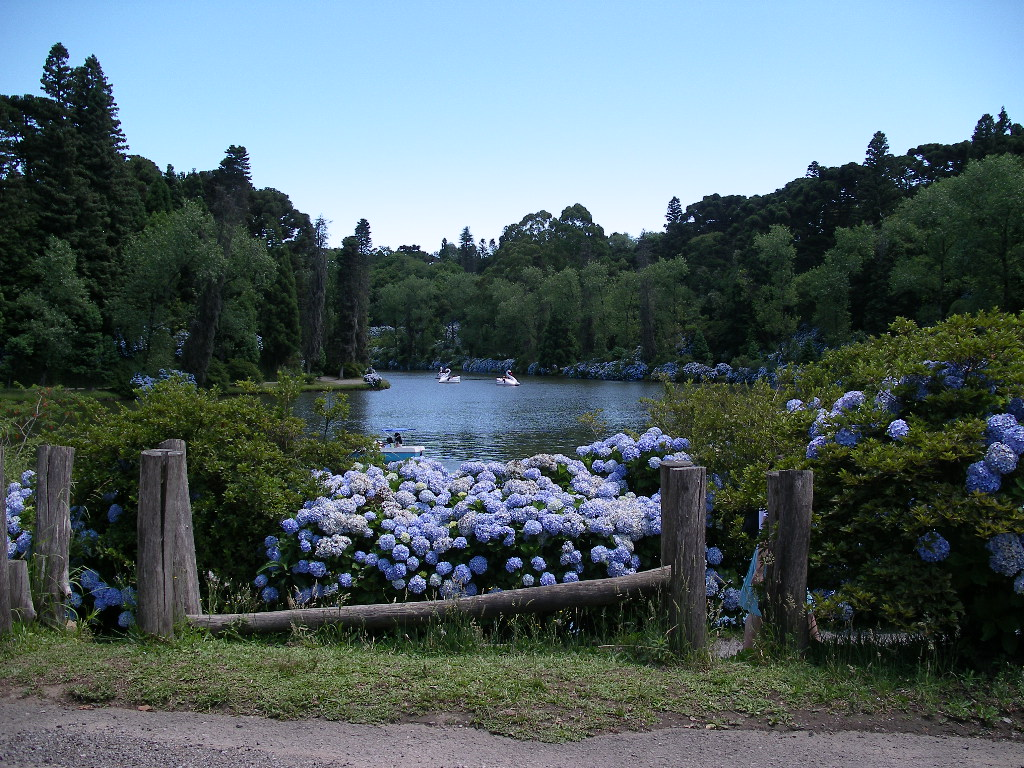
Hydrangeas along the Lago Negro in Gramado

The Região das Hortênsias (lit. 'Region of the Hydrangeas') is a tourist destination in the Serra Gaúcha region of the state of Rio Grande do Sul, Brazil. The cities in this region are: Nova Petrópolis, Gramado, Canela and São Francisco de Paula.

The Região das Hortênsias was created in 1989 to foment tourism in the area; however, the Região das Hortênsias is officially a "sindicato" or union established to help business development in the hospitality sector throughout the region.

Some in the region still speak German or the Brazilian variation of the German Hunsrückisch dialect called Riograndenser Hunsrückisch.
