= Presidente Lucena =

Municipality of Rio Grande do Sul, Brazil

- Municipality
- Presidente Lucena
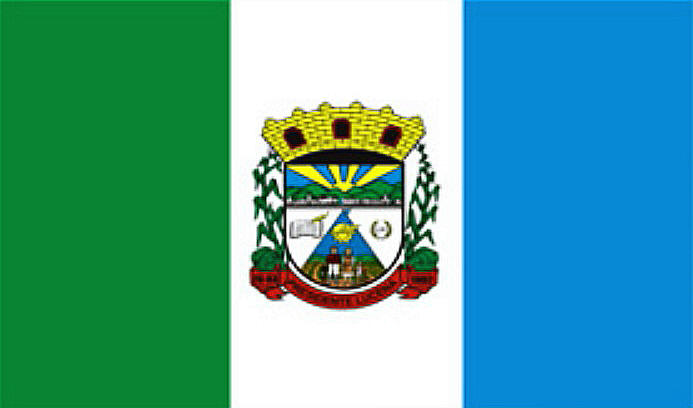
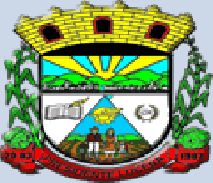
- Flag Coat of arms

- Location within Rio Grande do Sul

- Location in Brazil
- Coordinates: 29°31′08″S 51°10′40″W
- Country: Brazil
- State: Rio Grande do Sul

Government
  - Mayor: Gilmar Führ (PSDB)

Population (2020)
  - Total: 2,937
- Time zone: UTC−3 (BRT)
- Postal code: 93945-000

Presidente Lucena is a municipality in the state of Rio Grande do Sul, Brazil.

== See also ==
- List of municipalities in Rio Grande do Sul
