= Estância Velha =

Municipality of Rio Grande do Sul, Brazil

- Municipality
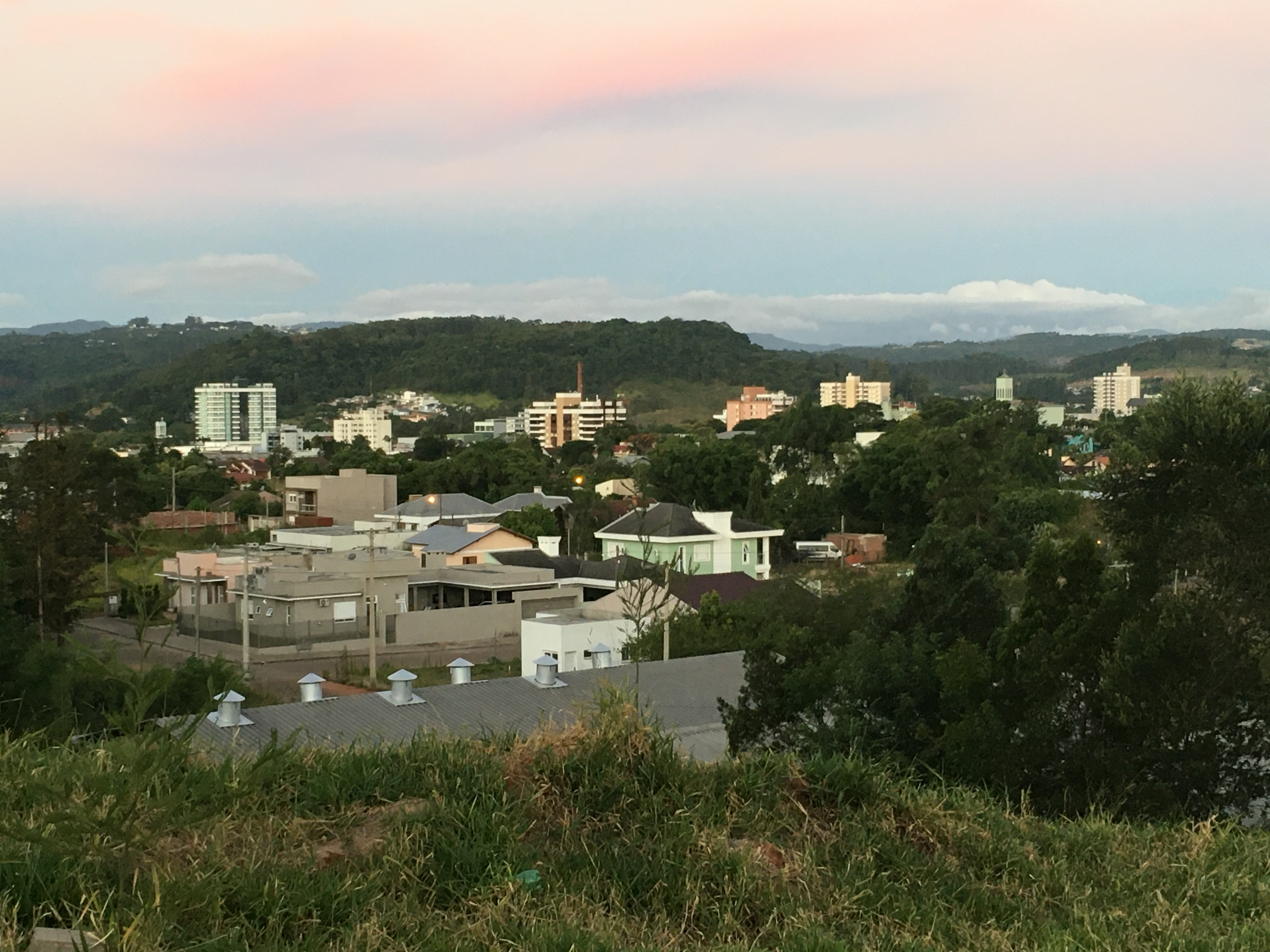

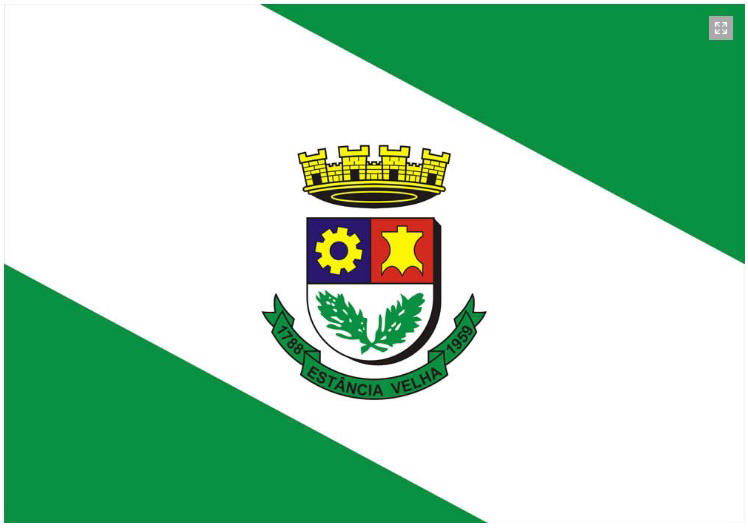
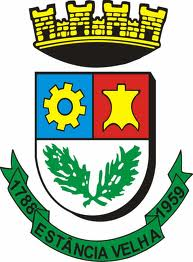
- Flag Coat of arms

- Location within Rio Grande do Sul

- Location in Brazil
- Coordinates: 29°39′S 51°11′W
- Country: Brazil
- State: Rio Grande do Sul

Population (2020)
  - Total: 50,672
- Time zone: UTC−3 (BRT)

Estância Velha is a municipality located in the state of Rio Grande do Sul, Brazil. According to 2021 IBGE data, it has a population of 51,292 inhabitants.

== History ==
The history of Estância Velha began with the arrival of the indigenous people. After their presence, records indicate that in 1788, the area became part of the Real Feitoria do Linho Cânhamo, established on the banks of the Rio dos Sinos to occupy the land for the Portuguese Crown and produce hemp, a raw material for making ship rigging that Portugal exported to other countries. When the occupation plan failed to meet expectations, the lands of the Real Feitoria were distributed to German immigrants in 1824, during the period of Imperial Brazil under Dom Pedro. The first German immigrant to settle in Estância Velha was Mathias Franzen, who cleared the land and began farming. As a shoemaker, he also practiced his trade from 1830 onwards, which he had learned in Europe. His arrival was followed by that of other immigrant families.

In the late 19th century, the foundation for the town's industrial development was laid. Estância Velha's leather industry dates back to 1890, initially focusing on saddles and riding accessories before expanding to tanning hides and producing footwear, which became the region's main economic driver. With both industry and agriculture thriving, Estância Velha was designated as the seat of the tenth district of São Leopoldo on 15 January 1930. After nine years of advocacy, Estância Velha was officially emancipated on 8 September 1959.

== Geography ==
Estância Velha is part of the Porto Alegre microregion within the Porto Alegre Metropolitan Mesoregion. It is one of the municipalities located in the Sinos River basin.

== See also ==
- List of municipalities in Rio Grande do Sul
