= Vera Chaves Barcellos =

Brazilian artist & educator (born 1938)

- Born: 1938 (age 87–88); Porto Alegre, Rio Grande do Sul, Brazil
- Education: Instituto de Belas-Artes de Porto Alegre; Central School of Arts and Crafts; Saint Martin's School of Art; Royal Academy of Art, The Hague; Académie de la Grande Chaumière; Willem de Kooning Academy
- Known for: Artist, Educator
- Notable work: Enigmas (1996/2015), Epidermic Shapes (1977/1982)
- Website: www.verachaves.com

Vera Chaves Barcellos (born 1938) is a Brazilian artist and educator. She was featured in the Radical Women show at the Brooklyn Museum in 2018.

In her work Barcellos explores the theme of the human body as landscape to engage with the natural environment and makes a symbiotic relations with landscape. Like Delfina Bernal, Silvia Gruner and Lygia Pape, such connections between the land and the body is as revealing conceptual and aesthetic actions of a representative, cultural, and ritual nature.

== Early life and education ==
Barcellos was born in Porto Alegre, Rio Grande do Sul, Brazil, in 1938. She graduated in 1956 from Instituto de Belas-Artes de Porto Alegre, having studied music. However, she gave up her plans to be a musician and instead, she decided to pursue the visual/fine arts. Between 1961 and 1962, Barcellos studied printmaking, painting at the Central School of Arts and Crafts and Saint Martin's School of Art in London, at the Royal Academy of Art, The Hague and at the Académie de la Grande Chaumière in Paris. Also, she studied lithography and linocut at the Willem de Kooning Academy in Rotterdam, Netherlands. After these studies, she dedicated herself to printmaking.

== Career ==
During the 1970s, Barcellos taught printmaking at Universidade Feevale, in Novo Hamburgo and began to incorporate photography in her work. After receiving a scholarship in 1975, she undertook further studies on photography at the Croydon College of Art and Technology in London. After this experience, photography became the central medium for the artist. Also, reproduction became important to her questioning of the nature of images. Her series Testarte was presented at the 1976 Venice Biennale and at the 1977 São Paulo Art Biennial. From 1970 to 1977, Barcellos taught engraving and painting at the Federação de Ensino Superior de Novo Hamburgo.

Since the 1980s Barcellos's production has included multimedia installations, manipulated photography, computerized images, objects, videos, and animation. Her work has been included in group exhibitions in Latin America, Europe, South Korea, Japan, the United States, and Australia. She has also had solo exhibitions in Brazil and abroad.

In 2004, Barcellos became a Spanish citizen. Three years later, Barcellos received the Prêmio Joaquim Felizardo. With the artists Carlos Pasquetti and Patricio Farias, she launched the Obra Aberta Gallery, which operated from 1999 to 2002. In 2003, she established the Vera Chaves Barcellos Foundation which owns more than 1,500 works by Brazilian and other artists in Porto Alegre, dedicated to the preservation and promotion of contemporary art. In 2007, the Centro Cultural Santander in Porto Alege presented a retrospective of her work.

In 2015 she participated in the international collective exhibition "A Mão Negativa," with curator Bernardo de Souza, in Parque Lage, Rio de Janeiro.

== Artworks ==
=== Installation ===
Epidermic Scapes, 1977/1982

This work consists of thirty printed images on translucent paper (1977) enlarged and printed in an analogic process on photographic paper. It is a black and white image of close-ups of skin which does not read as skin, but as landscapes. From an interview, Barcellos revealed the ideas behind the work saying that "from the beginning I had this idea of enlarging them. All the textures of any body is different and we have in our body infinity of landscapes." The work is intended to show a problem of documentation, to suggest terrestrial landscapes, and revoke a questioning of limits of what is and is not. Art critic and curator Icleia Borsa Cattani says that "These were a question of a selection of elements which allowed an ambiguous reading: that which is intrinsically ours (our body) viewed as something exterior to us (a landscape)."

“Enigmas”, 1996 (Enigmas)

Barcellos made this work at Galeria Artual in Barcelona, in 1996. It shows a cultural evolution of man, the origin of matter, of life, the beginnings of language. Also, she refers the continuity regarding the procedures from previous works, which means that a photographic image comprised its origin as “totally circumstantial”. In Enigmas, photographs of great primates from the Barcelona Zoo are located in the middle, and it is shown as manipulated, enlarged, photocopied object and form the three main images in the exhibition. A grotesque and ironic appearance of the primate bride brings into the question: does the marriage animal-culture succeed?

Cegueses, 1997 (Blindness: the Tiresias’ way or reflexions on blindness)

This is the only installation in which Barcellos didn't use images but only texts because it was for an “in situ” installation for a collective show held in the Museu d’Art de Girona, in the north of Catalunya. It described the main works of five Brazilian artists, Lygia Clark, Helio Oiticica, Cildo Meireles, Antonio Dias and Waltercio Caldas: All had worked with different non-visual matters in the '60s and '70s. It suggests multiple interpretations and metaphors about blindness, presented through the visual arts, literature, and a lectures cycle. The work exhibited by Vera Chaves had as its title "O Caminho de Tirésias ou Reflexões sobre a Cegueira: um Ensaio sobre Cinco Artistas Brasileiros."

"Per Gli Ucelli", 2010

Barcellos said about this work, "I think the installation for Octógono, in a certain way, is divided into three parts: Two of them are in the platform, where we have two aspects – the ancient craftsmanship of manipulating glasses, and the postmodern technology of light circuits mechatronic commands. And hovering over this, the “natural” sound of birds. Although a manipulation was elaborated using overlapping tracks with different birds singing, nature is still the origin of the sounds." She intended to show a dialogue between the created object and nature throughout this work, reflecting her view since she was young that the world was divided in two different elements, nature and the built.

Memorial Series

- “Memorial III – Dones de la Vida”, 1992. (Memorial III – Women of one's Life)

This is an installation about memory and the female universe. An original photo of flowers and hundreds names of women are used in it. Also, it consisted of many materials such as marble, paper, and objects which are manipulated. It presents the idea of femininity, time, memory, and life and death.

- “Memorial IV”, 1992 (memorial IV)

This installment states the decadence of classical culture in postmodern times. Many materials are used, for example, fragmented photocopies of photographs of ornaments, bits of marble plates, a large white cotton cloth which covers the entire surface of the room. A plate of glass covers the entrance door so that people can see but they cannot enter into the space. The only lighting comes from 15-watt bulbs placed under the cloth in front of each plate. It is a funeral chamber to classical culture. It develops the cultural memory by employing manipulated photography using paper and marble.

- "Memorial V – Pau-Brasil Uma câmara ardente para as árvores brasileiras", 2005

This work was built for a memorial to the destruction of Brazilian forests. Engraved marmol plates with the names of 420 trees collected from a Brazilian dictionary, most of them of indigenous origin, were placed side to side in both lateral walls of the installation's central room. At the entrance, in a dark chamber, there are back-light boxes with photoliths by the artist from the 70s. However, now it shows images of forests, trees and cut woods. The last room presents a DVD projection, which shows similar images superposed with images of a flame in permanent movement.

=== Video ===
A definição da arte (1996)

This is a short video made by Barcellos. She uses humor and irony to make a satire of the intellectualized discussion that accompanies contemporary art production. What could mean despise for academic rhetoric is, above all, a high-spirited commentary on a situation as frequent as it is human – all too human, it is worth noting.

=== Recent work ===
One of the recent work is Enigmas (2015) Centro Municipal de Arte, Hélio Oiticica, Rio de Janeiro, Brasil. According to Barcellos, this exhibition could also be classified as an installation which is made of images, fossils, skin pieces and salt boxes. There is a documentary about this exhibition " Enigmas "Documentário sobre "Enigmas", de Vera Chaves Barcellos by Vera Chaves Barcellos, and it was shown from March 7 to May 23, 2015 in Centro Municipal de Arte Hélio Oiticica, Rio de Janeiro, Brasil.

== Organization and influence ==
Chaves Barcellos has been dedicated to the dissemination of Contemporary Art, participating in the organization of several exhibitions and publications. she was one of the founders of Nervo Óptico, a group of artists active in Porto Alegre between 1976 and 1978. She managed the influential exhibition space Espaço N.O with eight female artists, and promoted alternative formats, such as mail art, performance, dance-theater, and installation. Since the 1980s she has been carrying out multimedia installations, manipulated photography, computerized images, objects, videos, and animation. She administered Galeria Obra Aberta in Porto Alegre from 1999 to 2002, and opened the foundation that bears her name in 2003. Fundação Vera Chaves Barcellos currently owns more than 1500 works by Brazilian and other artists, for example, Mira Schendel (1919–1988), Lygia Clark (1920–1988), León Ferrari (1920–2013), Sol LeWitt (1928–2007), Christo (born 1935), Regina Silveira (born 1939), and Paulo Bruscky (born 1949).

== Recent exhibitions ==
Individual Exhibitions

2010

- Per gli Ucelli, Octógono, Pinacoteca do Estado de São Paulo, São Paulo, Brasil.

2011

- Per gli Ucelli: Derivas, Bolsa de Arte, Porto Alegre, Brasil.

2012

- Memória de um Rio, Studio Clio, Porto Alegre, Brasil.

2013

- Inéditos, ou quase…, Sala dos Pomares, Fundação Vera Chaves Barcellos, Viamão, Brasil.
- FORAPALAVRADENTRO, Espaço Cultural Campus II, Feevale, Novo Hamburgo, Brasil.

2015

- Fata Morgana ou A Imagem Transformada, Galeria Bolsa de Arte, São Paulo, Brasil.
- Enigmas, Centro Municipal de Arte Hélio Oiticica, São Paulo, Brasil.

2017

- Vera Chaves Barcellos – fotografias, manipulações e apropriações. Paço Imperial, Rio de Janeiro, Brasil

Collective Exhibitions

2015

- Livro de artista no Brasil, Galeria de Arte Paulo Campo Guimarães, Biblioteca Pública Estadual Luiz de Bessa, Belo Horizonte, Brasil.
- Ao amor do público I – Doações na ArtRio (2012–2015) e MinC/Funarte. Museu de Arte do Rio (MAR), Rio de Janeiro, Brasil.
- 19º Festival de Arte Contemporânea Sesc Videobrasil, SESC Pompeia, São Paulo, Brasil.
- Vestígios do Corpo – Obras de Figura Humana no Acervo do MARGS, Museu de Arte do Rio Grande do Sul, Porto Alegre, Brasil.
- A Mão Negativa, EAV Parque Lage, Rio de Janeiro, Brasil.
- Releituras da natureza-morta, Galeria Carbono, São Paulo, Brasil.
- 3X4 VIS(I)TA, Museu de Arte Contemporânea do Rio Grande do Sul, Porto Alegre, Brasil.
- Destinos dos Objetos – O artista como colecionador e as coleções da FVCB, Sala dos Pomares, Fundação Vera Chaves Barcellos, Viamão, Brasil.

2016

- Útero do Mundo, Museu de Arte Moderna de São Paulo, São Paulo, Brasil.
- Nervo Óptico: 40 anos, Centro Cultural São Paulo, São Paulo, Brasil.
- Um olhar de Berlim sobre a arte impressa em Porto Alegre (1960 a 2015), Museu de Arte do Rio Grande do Sul, Porto Alegre, Brasil.
- 7ª Feira Internacional de Edição Contemporânea Art Libris, Claustro de Santa Mónica, Barcelona, Espanha.
- Exposição Coletiva, Museo de Arte de Valls, Tarragona, Espanha.
- Humanas Interlocuções, Sala dos Pomares, Fundação Vera Chaves Barcellos, Viamão, Brasil.

2017

- El mundo en su espuma, Ángeles Baños, Badajoz, Espanha.
- Nervo Óptico: 40 anos, Sala dos Pomares, Fundação Vera Chaves Barcellos, Viamão, Brasil.
- Radical Women, Hammer Museum, Los Angeles, Estados Unidos.

2018

- Radical Women, Brooklyn Museum, Nova Iorque, Estados Unidos.
- Mulheres radicais: arte latino-americana 1960 – 1985, Pinacoteca de São Paulo, São Paulo, Brasil.
- AI-5 50 ANOS – Ainda não terminou de acabar, Instituto Tomie Ohtake, São Paulo, Brasil.
- Nervo Óptico – Conceitualismo e experimentação nos anos 70, Galeria Superfície, São Paulo, Brasil.
- O Poder da Multiplicação, Museu de Arte do Rio Grande do Sul, Porto Alegre, Brasil.

== Collections ==
Chaves Barcellos's pieces are in the collections of the Museu de Arte Moderna de Sao Paulo and Museu Nacional de Belas Artes in Rio de Janeiro.

Collection of Museu de Arte Moderna de Sao Paulo

- A grande semente, BARCELLOS, VERA CHAVES (1148)
- O que restou da passagem do anjo, BARCELLOS, VERA CHAVES
- Sem título, BARCELLOS, VERA CHAVES (1998.006)
- Sem título (da série: A filha de Godiva), BARCELLOS, VERA CHAVES

== Honors and awards ==
- 20th Salao de Gravuras de Belo Horizonte (1965)
- 4th Salo de Artes Visuais in Porto Alegre (1977)
- O grao da imagem (2007) was honored as best solo exhibition by Porto Alegre's secretary of culture in 2008.

== Publications ==
- Vera Chaves Barcellos- Obras Incompletas (Editora Zouk)
- A respeito do sorriso (Portuguese)

== Personal life ==
She currently lives and works in Barcelona and Viamão.
