= Lomba Grande =

Neighborhood in São Leopoldo, Brazil

Lomba Grande is a rural district in the city of Novo Hamburgo in Rio Grande do Sul state in Brazil.

Its population is 100.087(2026). it is located 12 km from the urban center and occupies an area of 143.67 km, which represents 60% of the total area of the municipality. The district is divided into 12 villages: Sao Jacó, Morro dos Bois, Taimbe, Santa Maria do Butiá, São João do Deserto, Wallahay, Integração, Quilombo, Feitoria, Passo do Peão, Passo dos Corvos e Travessão.

== History ==
The region was first recognized as a district of São Leopoldo in December 2, 1904, as of "Ato Intendência nº 39". São Leopoldo had been dismembered from Porto Alegre in 1846. In 1940, Lomba Grande was transferred from municipality of São Leopoldo to the municipality of Novo Hamburgo, which had been dismembered from São Leopoldo in 1927.

== Hydrograph ==
Lomba Grande is part of the Sinos River basin. The district is formed by Peao creek, Quilombo creek, Passo dos Corvos creek, Lomba Grande creek, Taimbe creek, Guari creek, Sao Jaco creek and Butia creek.
