= Schmitt-Presser Museum =

Museum in Novo Hamburgo, Brazil

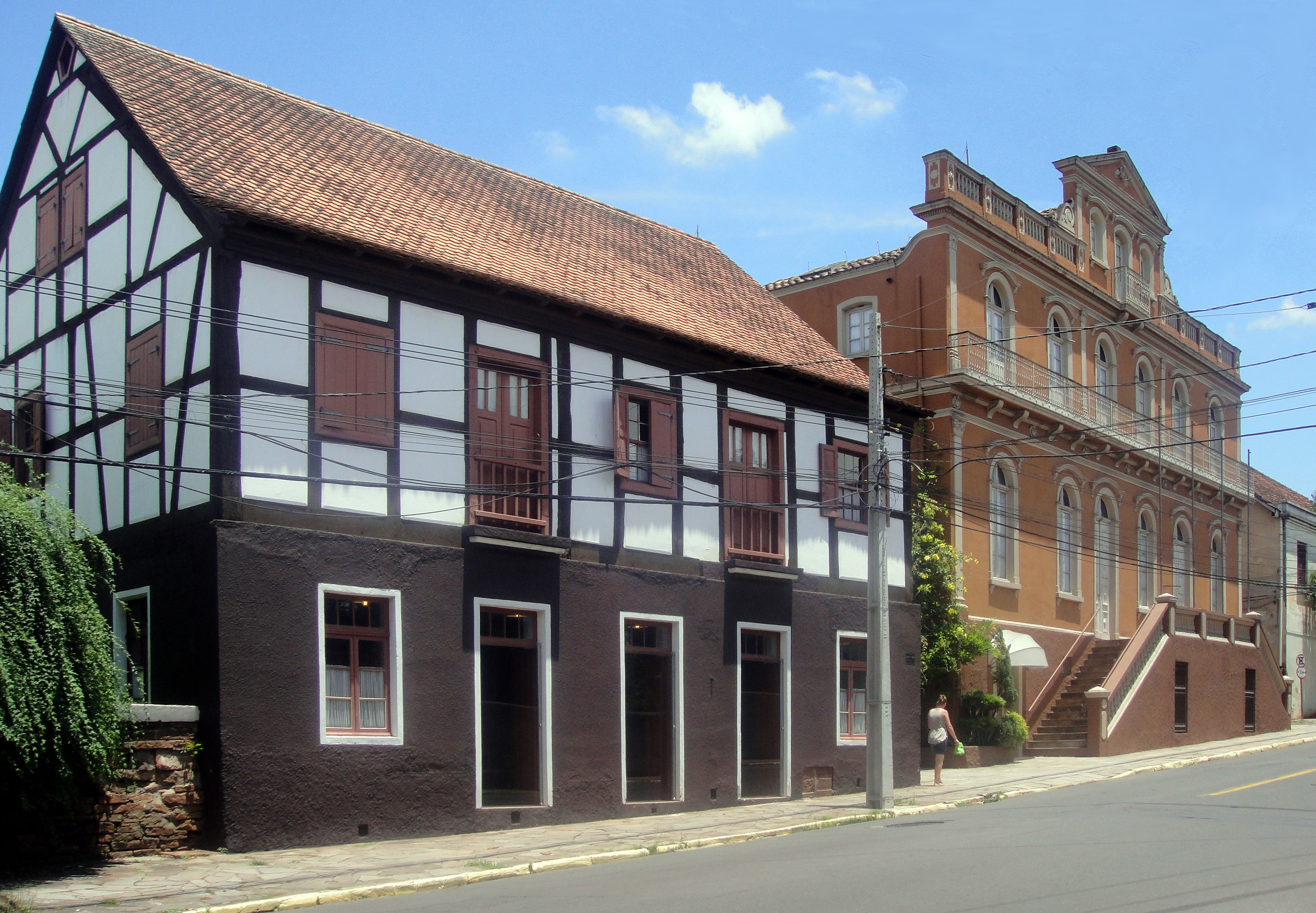
Schmitt-Presser Museum

Schmitt-Presser Museum (Portuguese: Museu Comunitário Casa Schmitt-Presser) is a historical museum in the Hamburgo Velho district of Novo Hamburgo, Brazil. It was originally constructed as a mansion in the first half of the nineteenth century by Johann Peter Schmitt, a German immigrant. It is one of the oldest examples of German architecture in Rio Grande do Sul state. In 1974, the artist Ernesto Frederico Scheffel decided to take the first step of preserving the house and in 1981, was declared a public utility by the city and listed by IPHAN, four years later. In 1992, the building was opened to the public as House Community Museum, Schmitt-Presser.
