= Igreja Três Reis Magos =

Lutheran church in Novo Hamburgo, Brazil

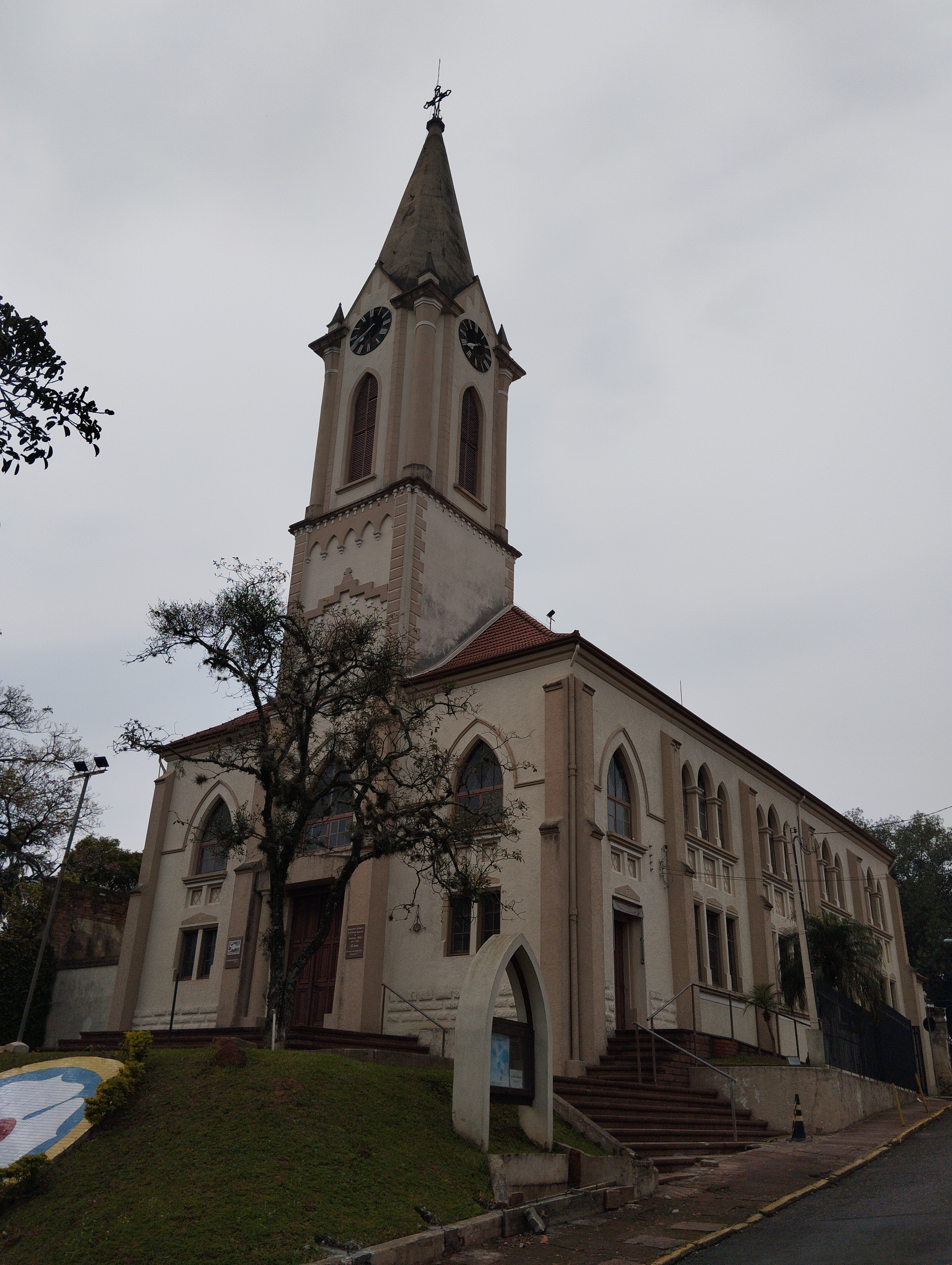

Religion
- Affiliation: Lutheran

Location
- Location: Novo Hamburgo, Rio Grande do Sul, Brazil
- Interactive map of Igreja Três Reis Magos

Igreja Três Reis Magos (English: Church of the Three Wise Men) is a Lutheran church located in the Hamburgo Velho district of Novo Hamburgo, Brazil. It belongs to the Evangelical Community of Lutheran Confession of Hamburgo Velho, part of the Rio dos Sinos Synod of the Evangelical Church of the Lutheran Confession in Brazil.

The congregation was founded on 6 January 1832 and was the first church in Novo Hamburgo. A first church building was constructed in 1833. In 1845, the congregation erected a new temple. In 1895, the church's bell tower began construction and was completed in 1898 with the installation of three church bells brought from Germany. Later on, the nave adjoining the tower was demolished and a new temple was built in its place and inaugurated on 4 April 1926. In 1936, the church acquired a pipe organ made by João Edmundo Bohn.

As of 7 November 2025, the church is a stop on the Roteiro dos Sinos.

The Igreja Três Reis Magos is a protected building of Novo Hamburgo by IPHAN.
