= Novo Hamburgo =

Municipality in Rio Grande do Sul, Brazil

- Municipality
- Municipality of Novo Hamburgo
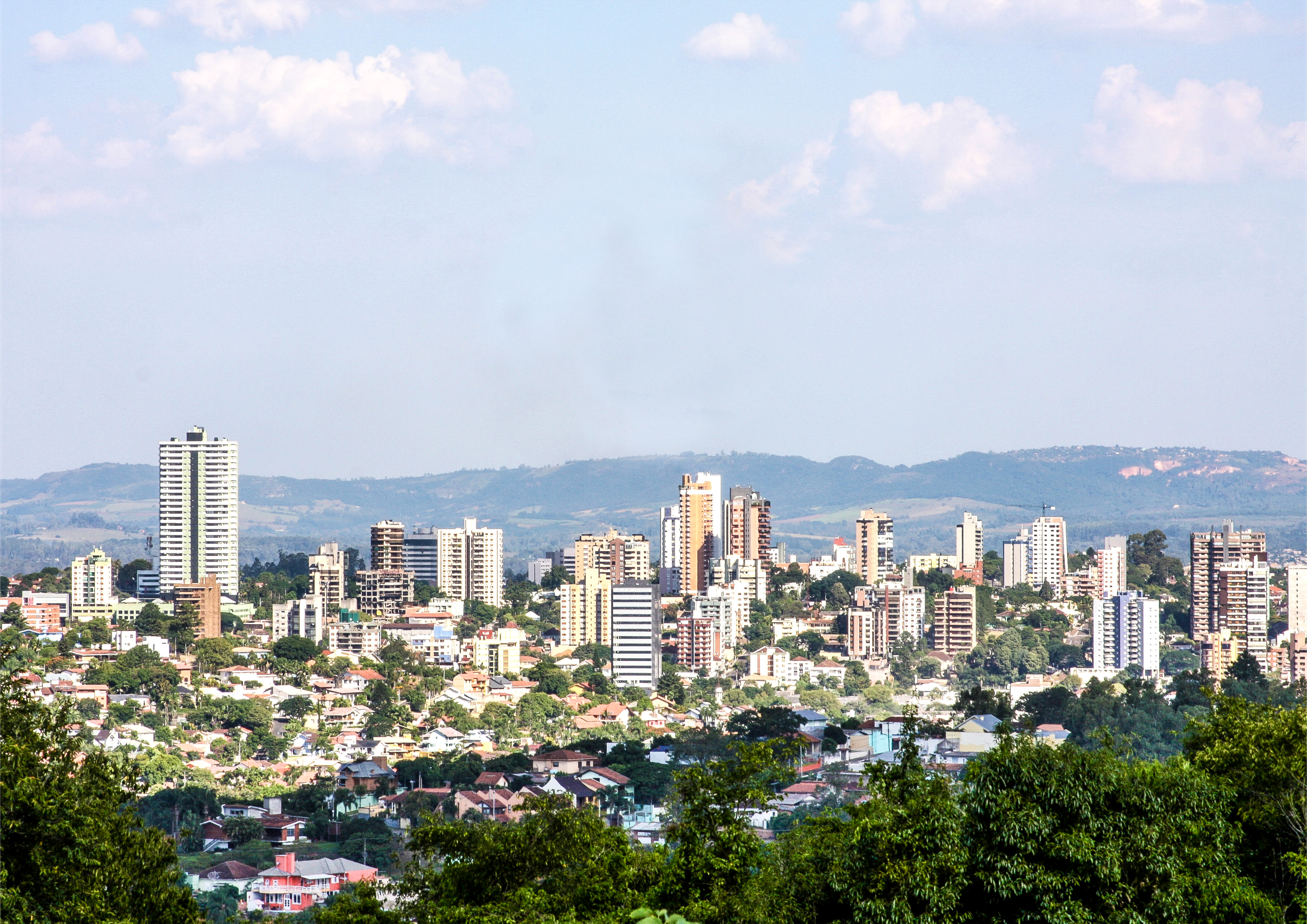
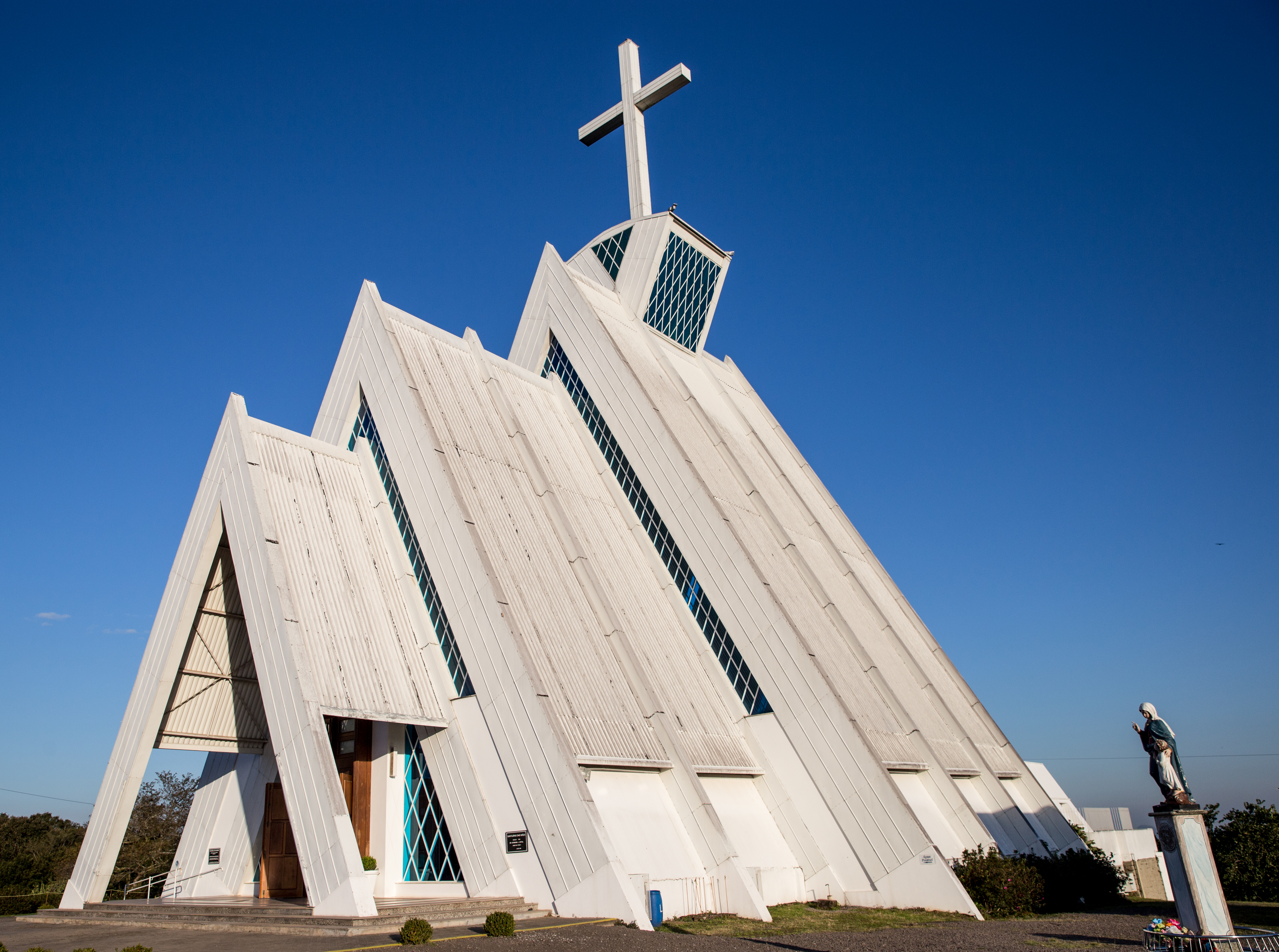
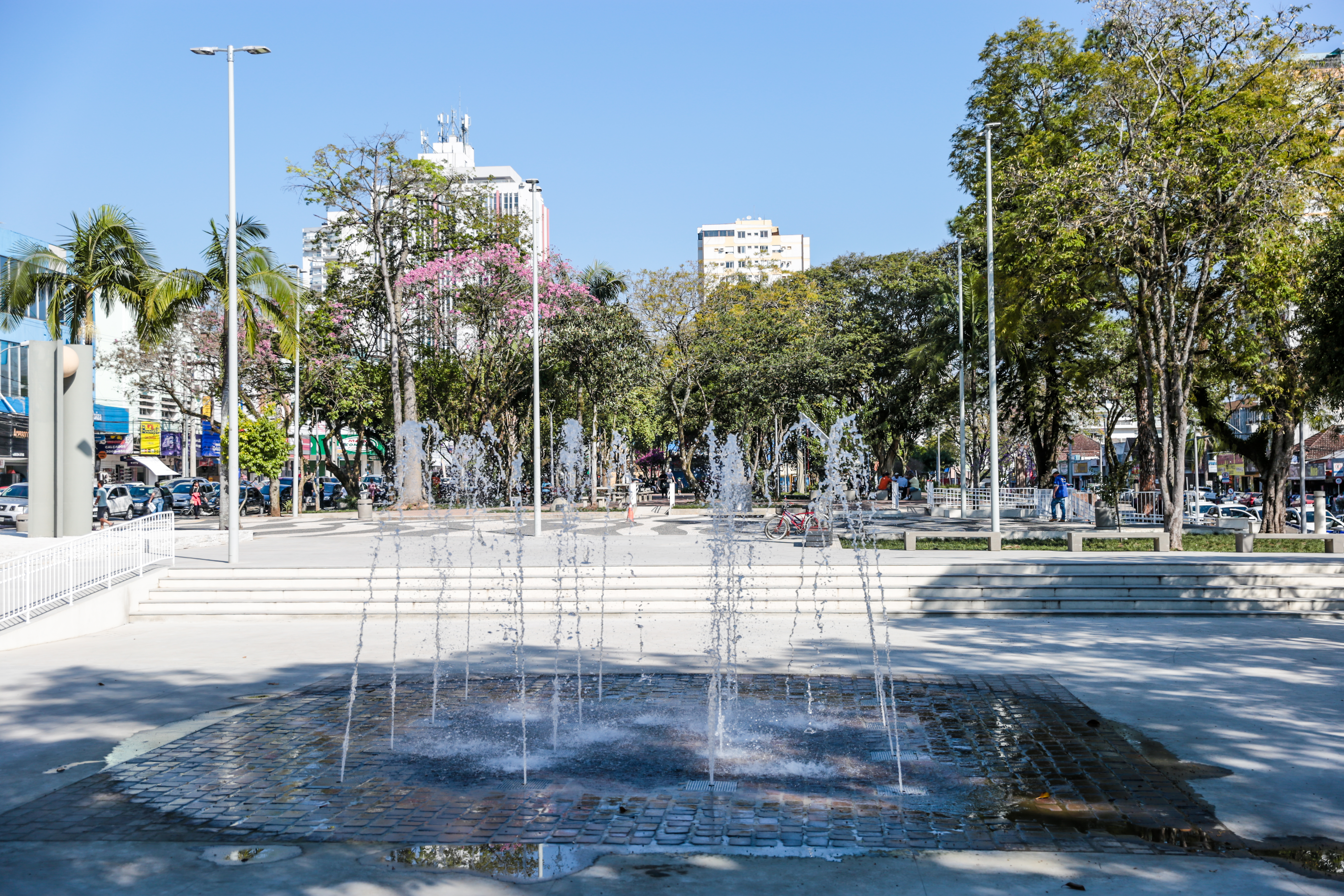
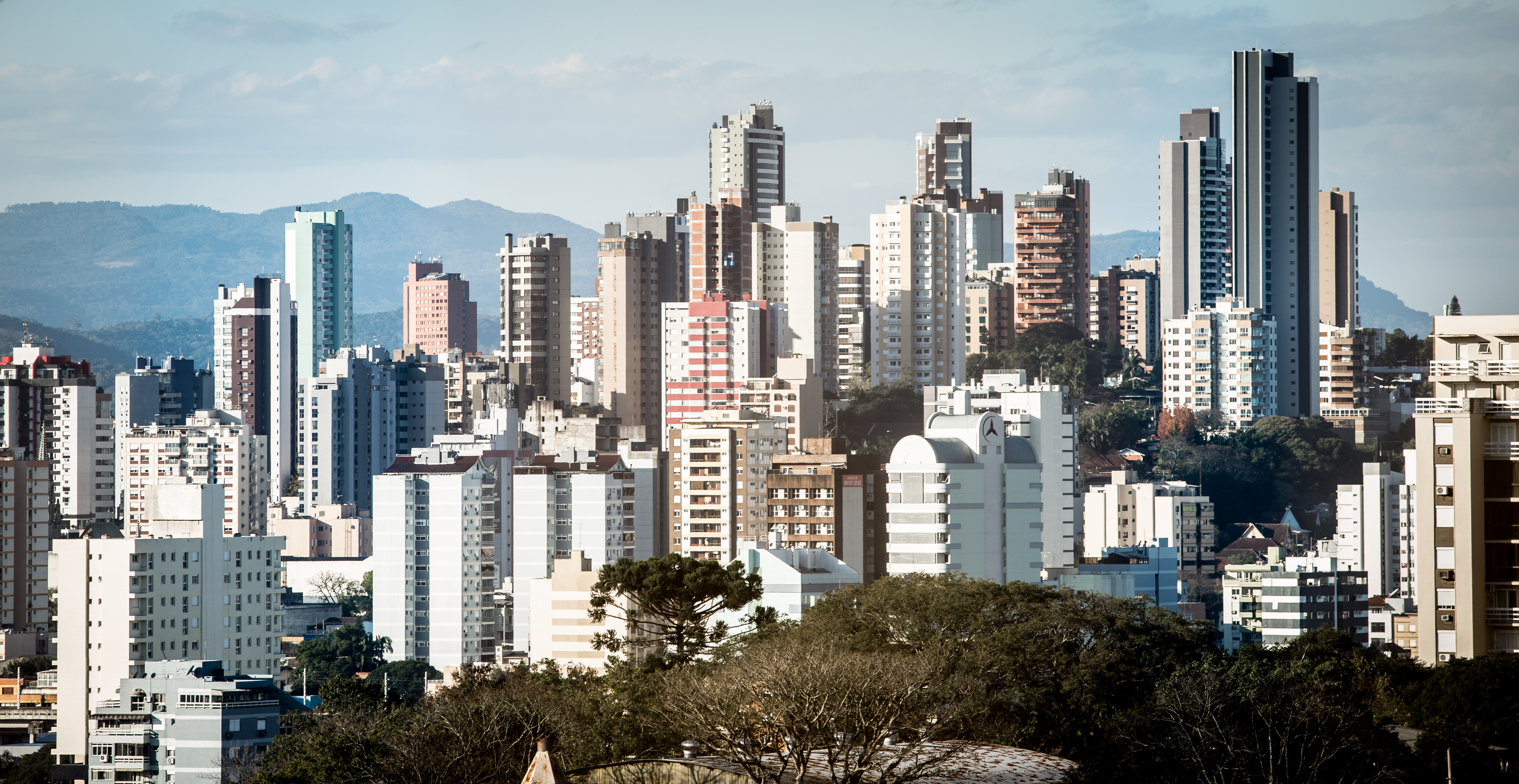
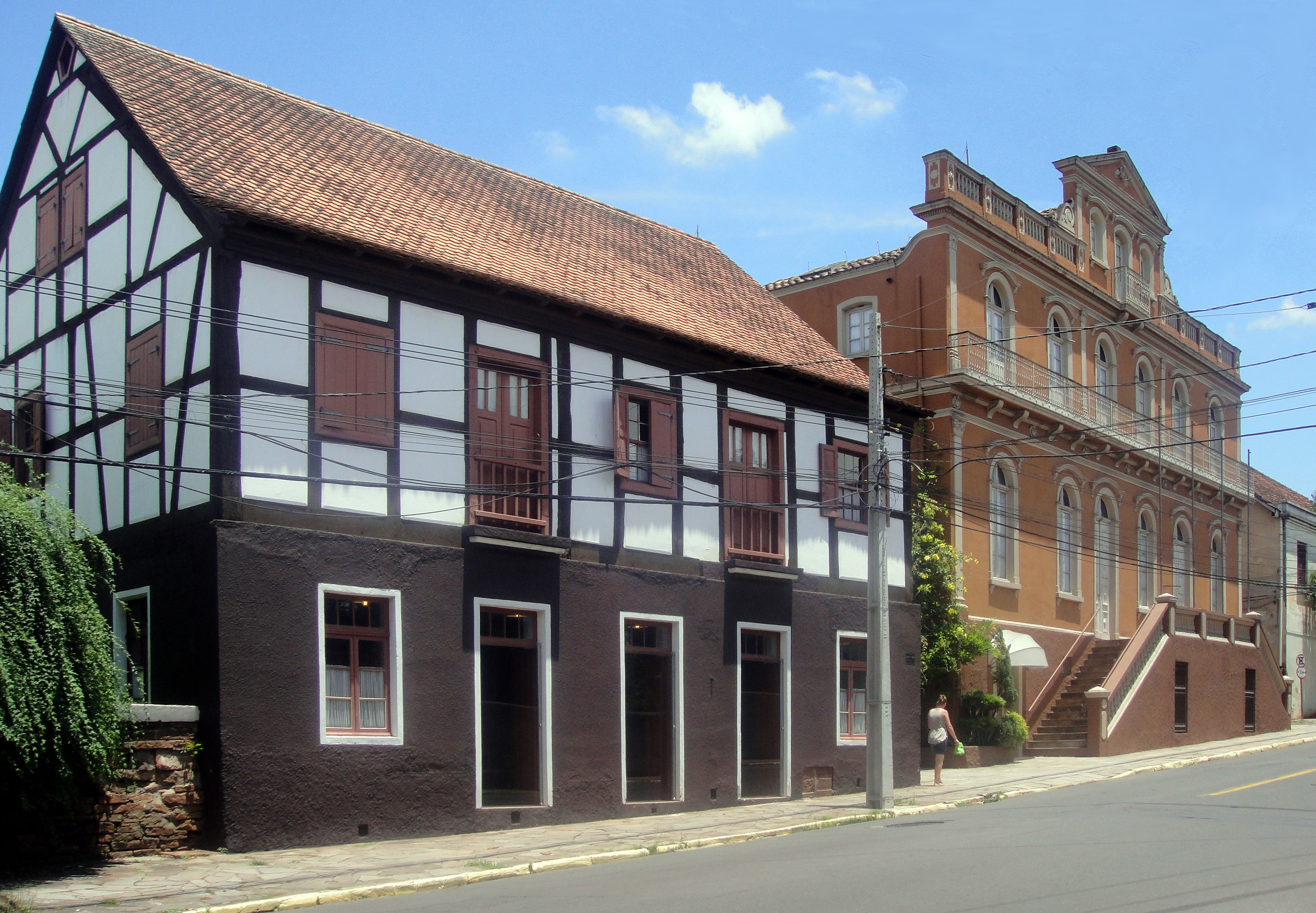
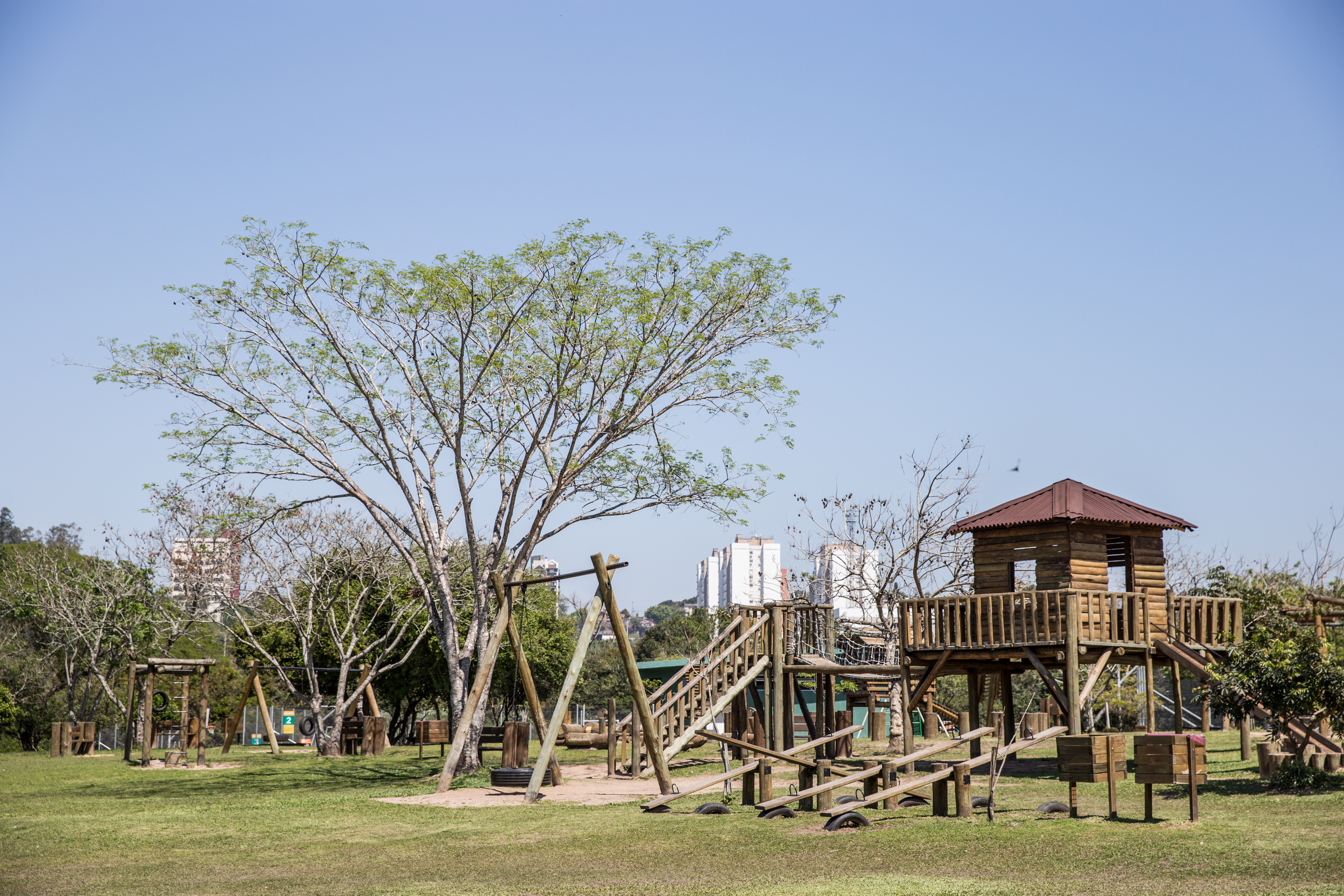
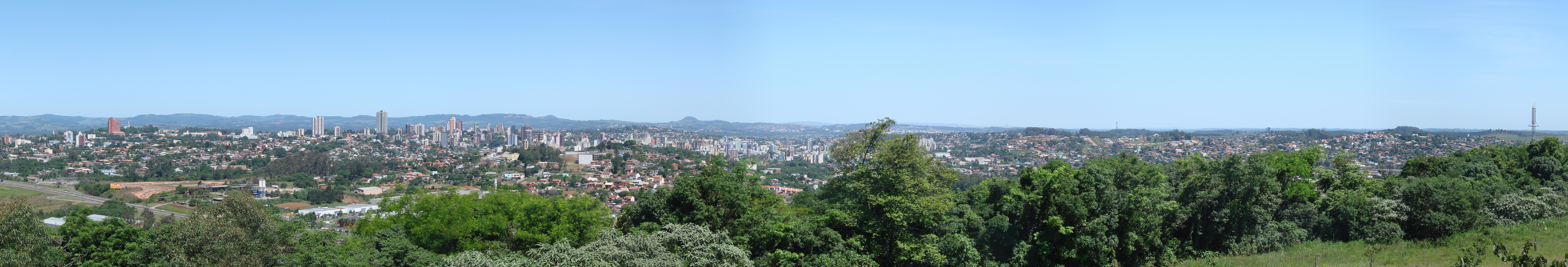

- Flag Coat of arms
- Nickname: National Capital of Shoes
- Location in Rio Grande do Sul, Brazil
- Coordinates: 29°40′40″S 51°07′51″W
- Country: Brazil
- Region: South
- State: Rio Grande do Sul
- Founded: 1832
- Incorporated: 1927

Government
  - Mayor: Fátima Daudt (PSDB)

Area
  - Total: 224 km^{2} (86 sq mi)
- Elevation: 57 m (187 ft)

Population (2022 Brazilian census)
  - Total: 227,646
  - Estimate (2025): 235,802
  - Density: 1,020/km^{2} (2,630/sq mi)
- Time zone: UTC−3 (UTC−3)
- HDI (2010): 0.747 – high
- Website: novohamburgo.rs.gov.br

Novo Hamburgo (Brazilian Portuguese: [ˈnovu ɐ̃ˈbuɾɡu]; German: Neu-Hamburg; both meaning 'New Hamburg') is a municipality in the southernmost Brazilian state of Rio Grande do Sul, located in the metropolitan area of Porto Alegre, the state capital. As of 2025, its population was 235,802. The city covers an area of 217 km^{2} (84 sq mi), and the average temperature is 19 °C (66 °F), which is mild for the region. The Sinos River runs through the urban area.

Consolidated by German immigrants, the city was named after Hamburg, Germany. Novo Hamburgo's population is still predominantly of German descent.

In the 1980s, Novo Hamburgo received the nickname of "the national capital of shoes", attracting many athletes, tracks and companies connected to the sport. Nowadays, the city is the industrial centre of the Sinos River Valley, the economy of which is based mainly on the manufacture of shoes and the associated leather goods supply chain.

== History ==
The area of the city was first settled by Portuguese immigrants in the mid 18th century, but it would grow to the status of village only with the arrival of the first German immigrants in 1824. At that time, Novo Hamburgo was part of São Leopoldo, the cradle of German immigration in Brazil. The Germans established a prosperous agricultural colony and eventually started to supply the state's main urban centers at that time with food.

Some of the immigrants also brought handicraft skills, valuable for a self-sufficient, isolated economy, as the valley and the state were at that time. In Novo Hamburgo, the first urban agglomeration appeared around the Hamburger Berg, circa 1870, where there was a little commerce. The city was emancipated from São Leopoldo on 5 April 1927, and soon joined the rest of Brazil in its run to industrialization. The city was made the seat of the Roman Catholic Diocese of Novo Hamburgo in 1980.

== Emancipation ==
In the mid-1920s, Novo Hamburgo was a sub district of São Leopoldo. At this time, the shoe industry was in full swing and there was an intense expansion of trade and an abundance of work for the service providers in the region. In 1924 this expansion prompted a group of men to create a committee with the goal of achieving emancipation for the district. These men were: Jacob Kroeff Neto, Pedro Adams Filho, Leopodo Petry, André Klipp, Julius Kunz, José João Carlos Martins and Carlos Dienstbach.

On three occasions letters sent to the São Leopoldo council requesting emancipation were denied. Faced with this rejection the group decided to send the request to the state government. The governor at that time was Borges de Medeiros who subsequently asked the commission to submit a formal application including voter signatures requesting emancipation.

Three years later on the 5 April 1927, Borges de Medeiros signed decree number 3818, known as "The order Gold" creating the municipality Novo Hamburgo. On the same day decree number 3819 was signed creating an administration with a constitutional basis and allowing for the nomination of a temporary mayor. The document gave a maximum period of two months to hold an election for mayor and councillors. Jacob Kroeff Netto was named the first Provisional Mayor of Novo Hamburgo by Borges, under decree number 3820.

== Geography ==
Novo Hamburgo is located in the south-central part of the Southern region of Brazil, at latitude 29°40'40" South and longitude 51°07'51" West. It currently forms part of the Porto Alegre Intermediate Geographic Region and the Novo Hamburgo-São Leopoldo Immediate Geographic Region.

=== Hydrography ===
Novo Hamburgo is part of the River Sinos basin. The city is divided into four basins, formed by Pampa creek, Cerquinho creek, Luiz Rau creek and Gauchinha creek. As well as these, there are several creeks that flow into the várzea region of the Sinos, both on the north bank of the river and in the south.

=== Climate ===
Novo Hamburgo has four well defined seasons. In winter, temperatures can hover around 0 °C (32 °F), and in some instances can reach −2 to −1 °C (28–30 °F). In the summer the temperatures get high, often above 30 °C (86 °F). The average temperature of Novo Hamburgo during the year is 19 °C (66 °F).

Climate data for Novo Hamburgo
Month	Jan	Feb	Mar	Apr	May	Jun	Jul	Aug	Sep	Oct	Nov	Dec	Year
Mean daily maximum °C (°F)	29.3 (84.7)	28.4 (83.1)	26.3 (79.3)	23.4 (74.1)	20.4 (68.7)	19.3 (66.7)	19.5 (67.1)	20.8 (69.4)	22.7 (72.9)	25 (77)	27.4 (81.3)	26.6 (79.9)	24.1 (75.4)
Daily mean °C (°F)	24.5 (76.1)	23.9 (75.0)	21.8 (71.2)	18.9 (66.0)	16 (61)	14.8 (58.6)	14.9 (58.8)	16.1 (61.0)	17.9 (64.2)	20 (68)	22.2 (72.0)	21.8 (71.2)	19.4 (66.9)
Mean daily minimum °C (°F)	19.8 (67.6)	19.4 (66.9)	17.4 (63.3)	14.4 (57.9)	11.7 (53.1)	10.4 (50.7)	10.4 (50.7)	11.5 (52.7)	13.1 (55.6)	15.1 (59.2)	17 (63)	17.1 (62.8)	14.8 (58.6)
Average precipitation mm (inches)	126 (5.0)	124 (4.9)	128 (5.0)	110 (4.3)	107 (4.2)	131 (5.2)	123 (4.8)	126 (5.0)	143 (5.6)	124 (4.9)	106 (4.2)	119 (4.7)	1,467 (57.8)

== Industry ==
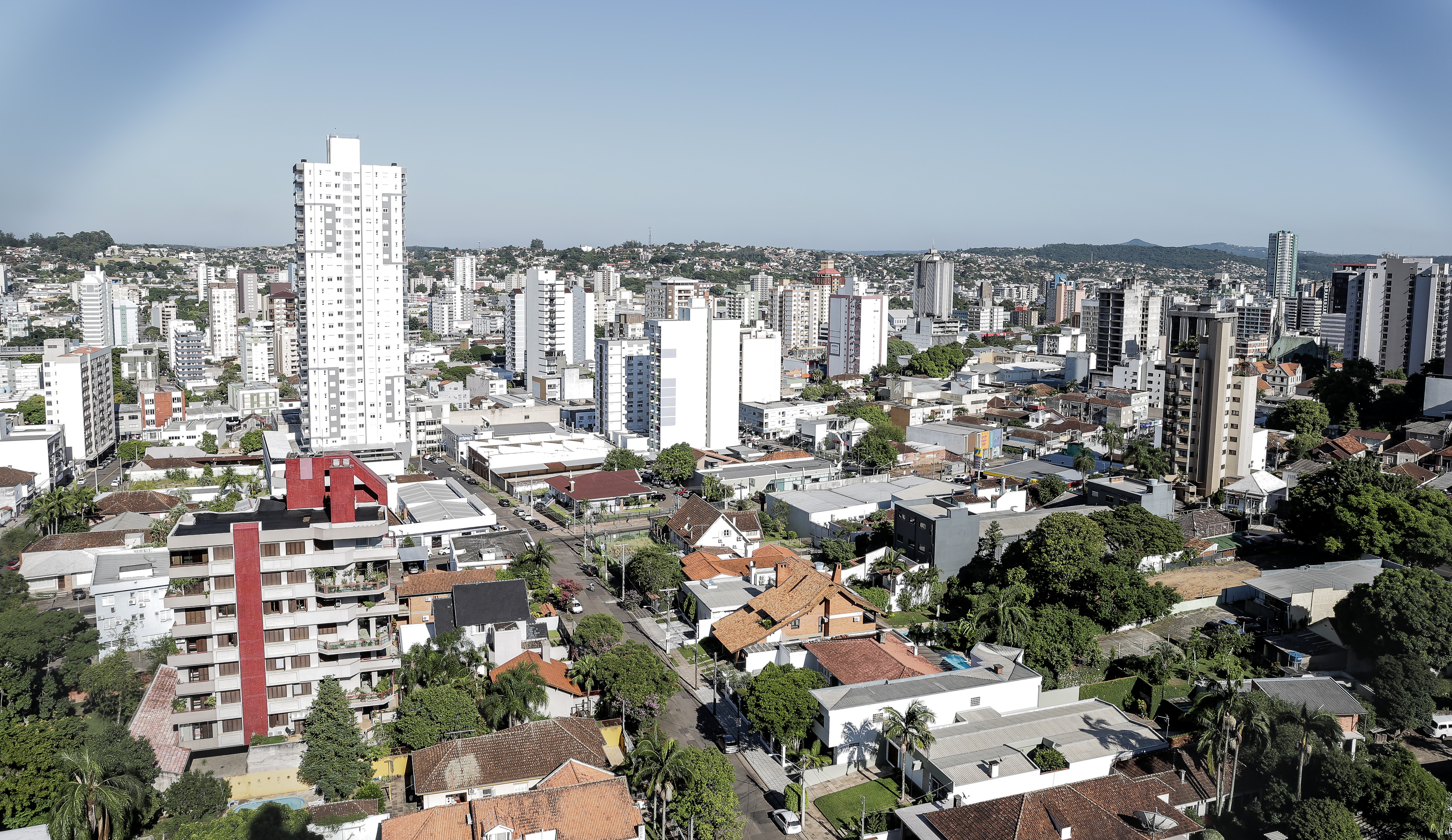
Novo Hamburgo seen from Canudos district

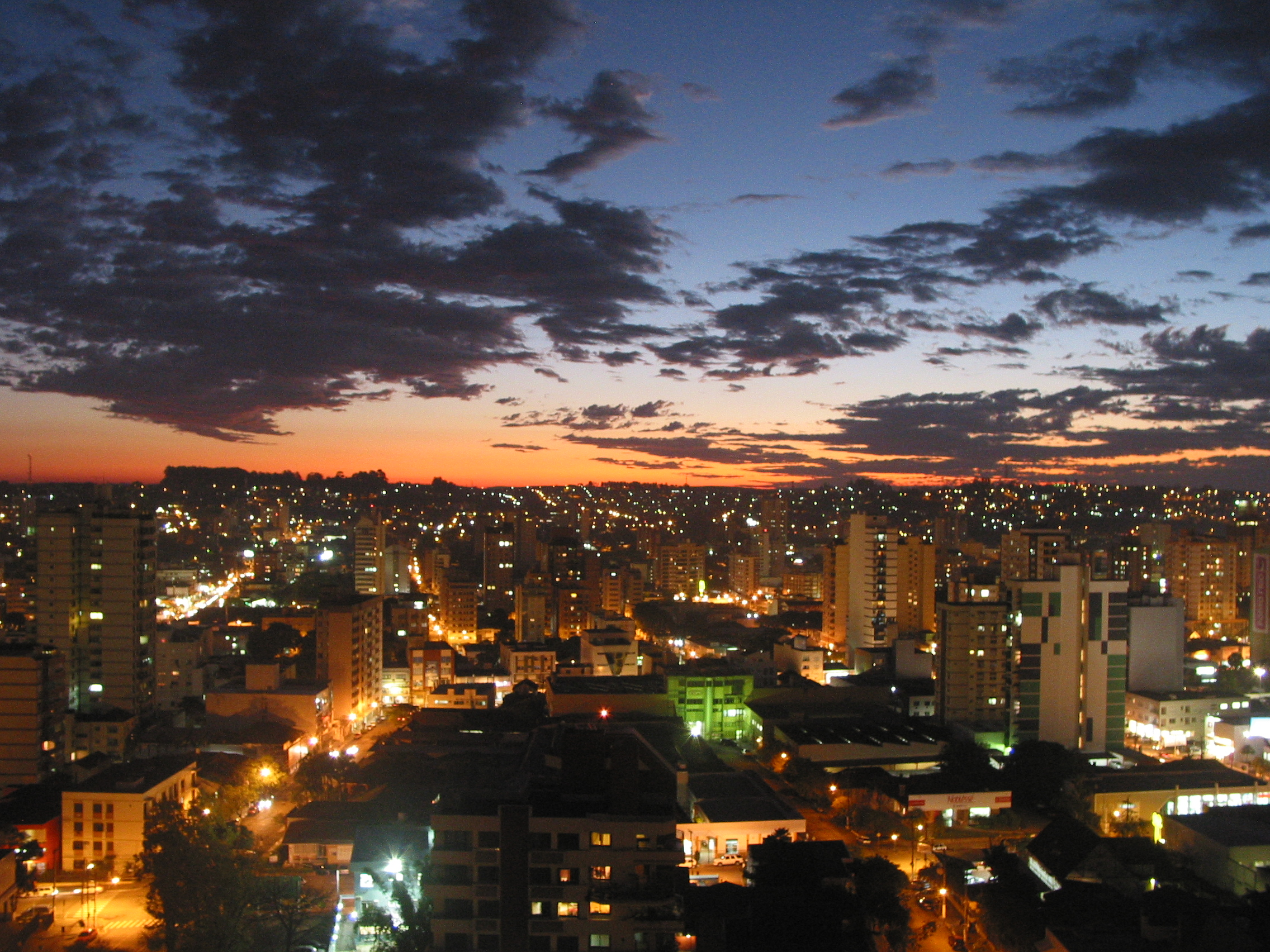
The city at dusk

Novo Hamburgo is most famous for its footwear industry. The footwear manufacturing industry came about quite quickly, and led to Novo Hamburgo being recognized as the Capital of Brazilian Footwear. The city also has industries in the area of pharmacy, cosmetics, furniture, food, appliances, clothing, graphic art, electronics, chemical and constructions.

This industry also spread into neighboring towns, with many tanneries, chemical plants and shoe component factories being opened. One example of this industry is the National Fair of Shoes held annually in Fenac. This fair was started locally in 1963 held in a small neighbourhood convention centre. Today, Fenac is not only home to this fair but also other related fairs such as Fimec (footwear machines exhibition), and Courovisão Ecovisão (Leather Fair).

A new Industrial District is being planned in the area of Lomba Grande, however some locals have voiced concerns that this construction may have environmental implications.

=== Export ===
It is estimated that about 80% of Brazilian exports of shoes come out of Rio Grande do Sul, with Novo Hamburgo being the center of these operations. Novo Hamburgo has developed a complete infrastructure for production, marketing and trading of footwear, and now has the largest movement of containers in Brazil. The export of shoes is currently worth about two billion dollars.

== Shops and services ==
Novo Hamburgo is the largest commercial area of Sinos River Valley, with more than 5,500 outlets, including major Brazilian chain stores such as Magazine Luiza, Lojas Renner, C&A, Lojas Americanas, Casas Bahia, Ponto Frio, Lojas Colombo and Delta Sul.

In the shopping district there are four large supermarkets (Wal-Mart, recently sold by the parent multinational and now under different ownership), Carrefour, Bourbon (Zaffari) and Hiper Rissul. There are two malls in this city: Bourbon Shopping Novo Hamburgo and i-Fashion Outlet.

Example of the service industry are cargo agents, brokers, export agents, trading companies as well as the presence of important banks.

== Theatre ==
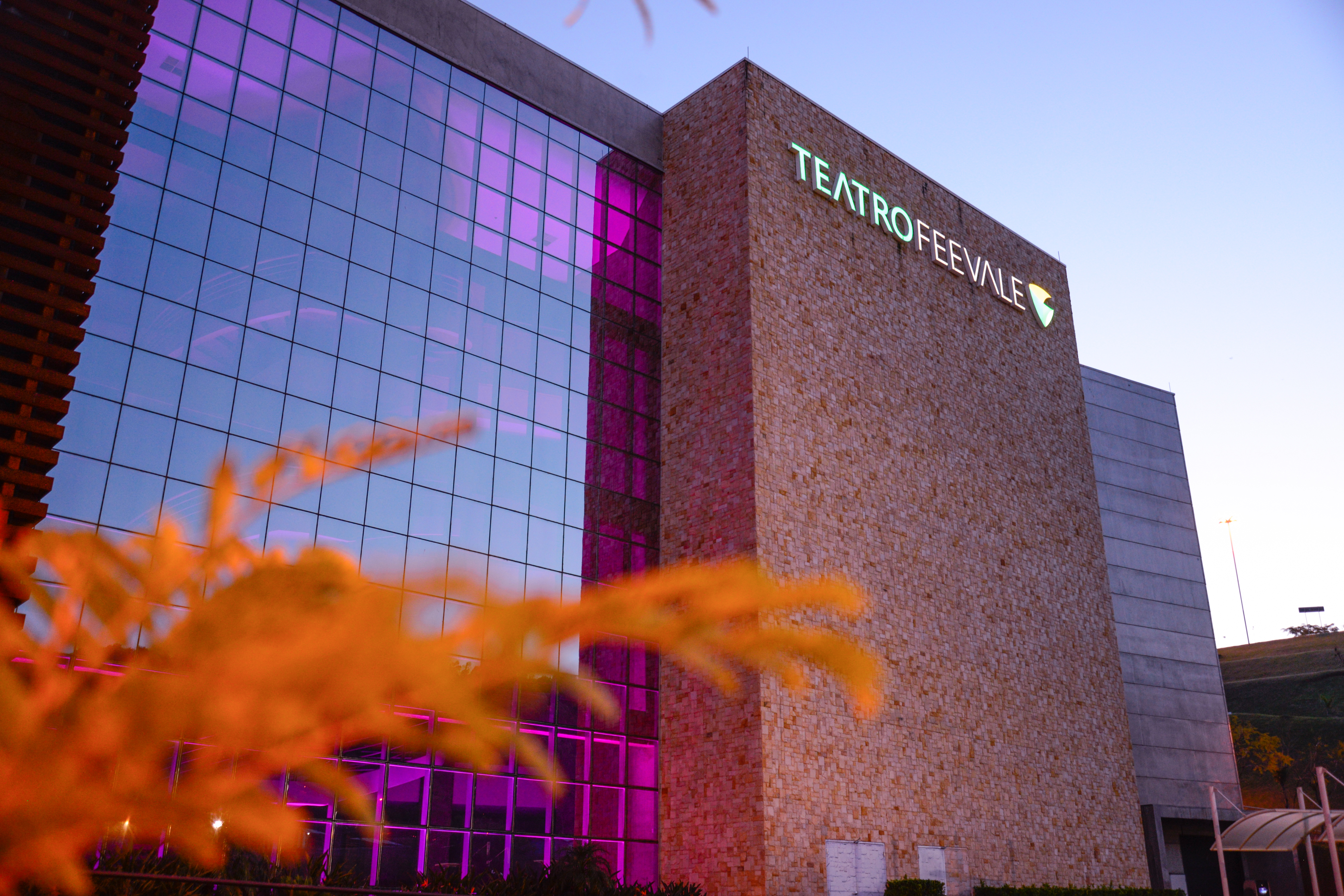
Theatre Feevale

The Paschoal Charlemagne Theatre located at the Culture Department of Novo Hamburgo, has a capacity for approximately 490 people. Paranóia Productions has a school in the theatre trains local actors. The school has sent students to the biggest cities of the country to work inplays and shows.

The Feevale University inaugurated on 20 September 2011 the largest theatre in the state of Rio Grande do Sul with a capacity to 1,805 spectators in Novo Hamburgo. The theatre was built in the campus II of the university. It is administered in partnership with Opus Promotions.

== Education ==
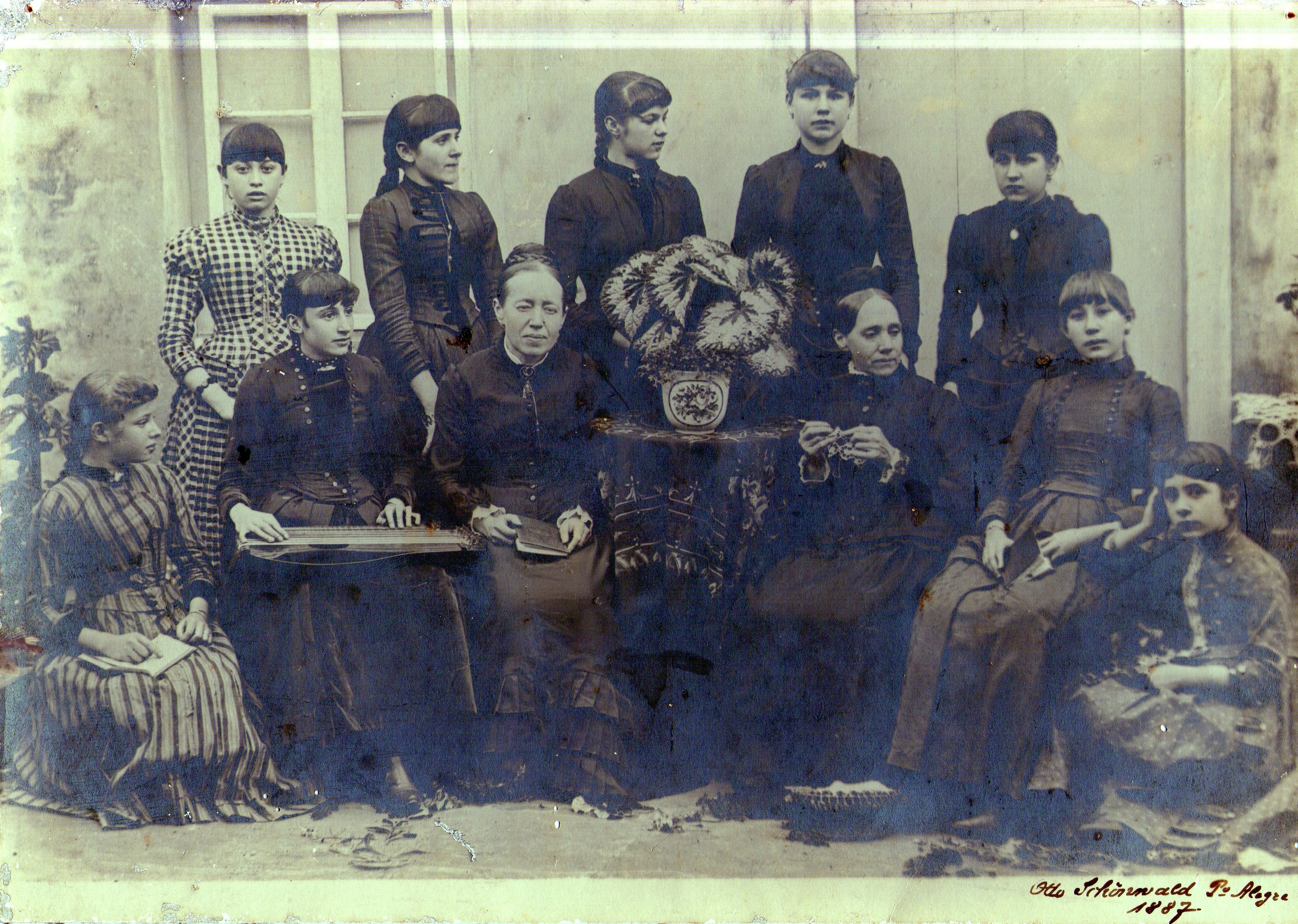
The first students of the Evangelical Foundation Teachers and Founders

The first school in Novo Hamburgo was founded in 1832, called Comunidade Evangélica Hamburgo Velho (Old Hamburg Evangelic Community). The school taught through the German language as that was the most common language at that time. The teaching material was poor and the provincial government was giving them little support. The central government at the time had no interest in investing in education and therefore would not release funds to the different provinces.

In 1833 there were only two public schools, in 1866 a school for girls was founded by a group of Nuns – The Engel Sisters located in the Hamburgo Velho neighborhood. which would become a "Fundação Evangélica" (Evangelic Foundation). The creation of this school was a big step for women's education, although still largely focused on traditional values such as child rearing and home care.

The first Catholic school created in the town was Santa Catarina college founded on the 10 June 1900 by the Sisters Maria Romualda Flash and Maria Julitta Schwark, who were invited to come to the Hamburg Berg region (which would later become Hamburgo Velho) by several families – Czermak, Carlos Klein, José Kroeff, João Altmeyer, Zimmer and Plentz.

The Jesuit priests arrived in the Sinos River Valley region in the mid-nineteenth century and took over the Church Nossa Senhora da Piedade in Hamburgo Velho. In 1914, the Priest Benedict Meienhofer organized the opening of a Catholic school for boys, which was called St. Jacob's college.

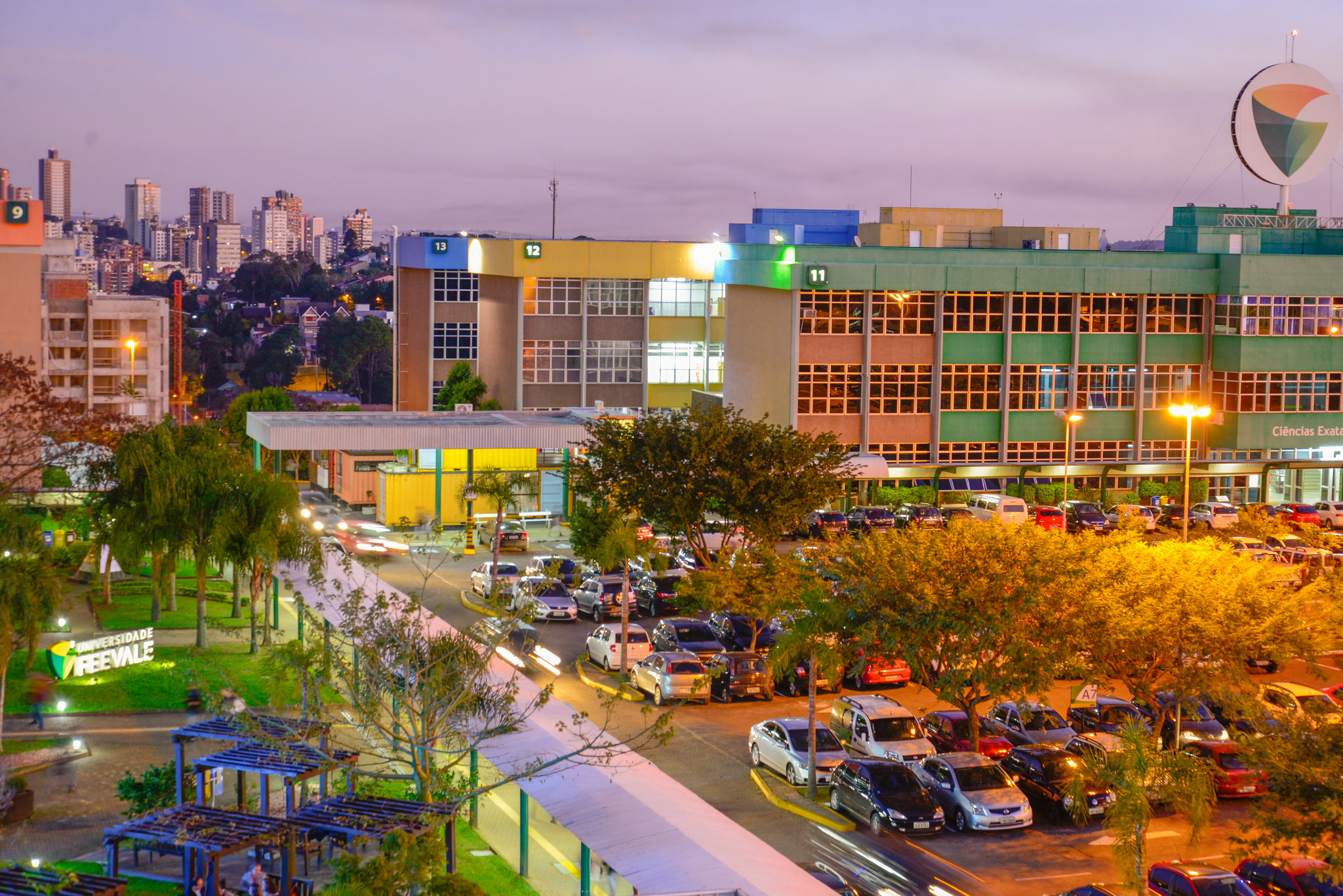
Feevale University

In 1927, the year when Novo Hamburgo was emancipated, there were seven state schools in the city, with a total of 374 students, one state school with 72 students and six private schools with 478 students. In 1930 there were eight state schools, six city run schools and eight private schools, with the student population rising to 1,477.

The Vargas Era (1930–1945) represented a significant advance in Brazilian education. This educational revolution also had an impact in Novo Hamburgo. In 1943, the city schools had grown to a total of 35, with a total of 3668 students.

The main educational institutions in Novo Hamburgo today are:

- Ceducs Centro de Educação Superior
- Colégio Marista Pio XII
- Colégio Santa Catarina
- Faculdade IENH — Instituição Evangélica do Novo Hamburgo
- Ftec Faculdades
- Fundação Escola Técnica Liberato Salzano V da Cunha
- Universidade Estadual do Rio Grande do Sul
- Universidade Feevale

== Tourism ==
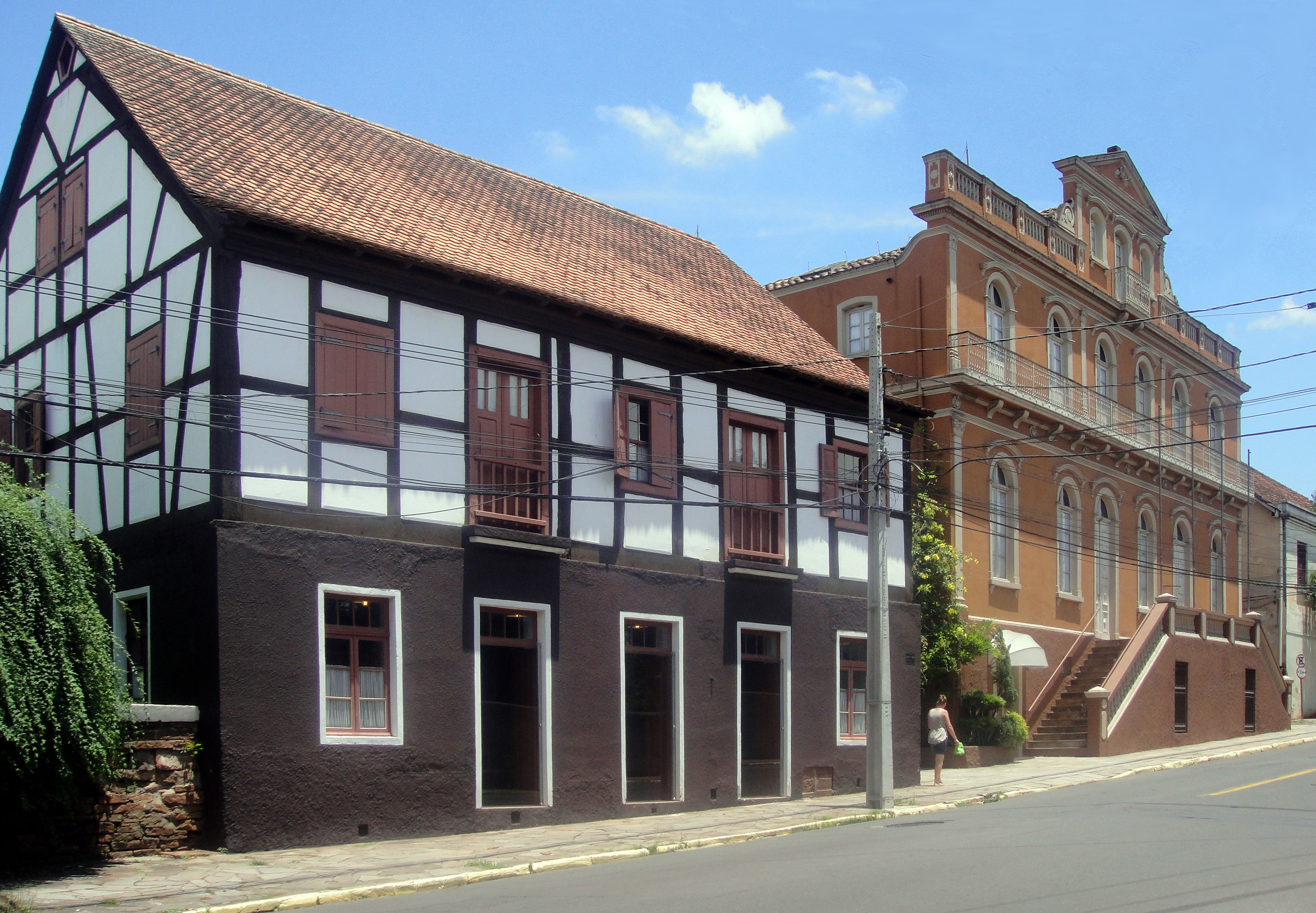
Schmitt-Presser Museum

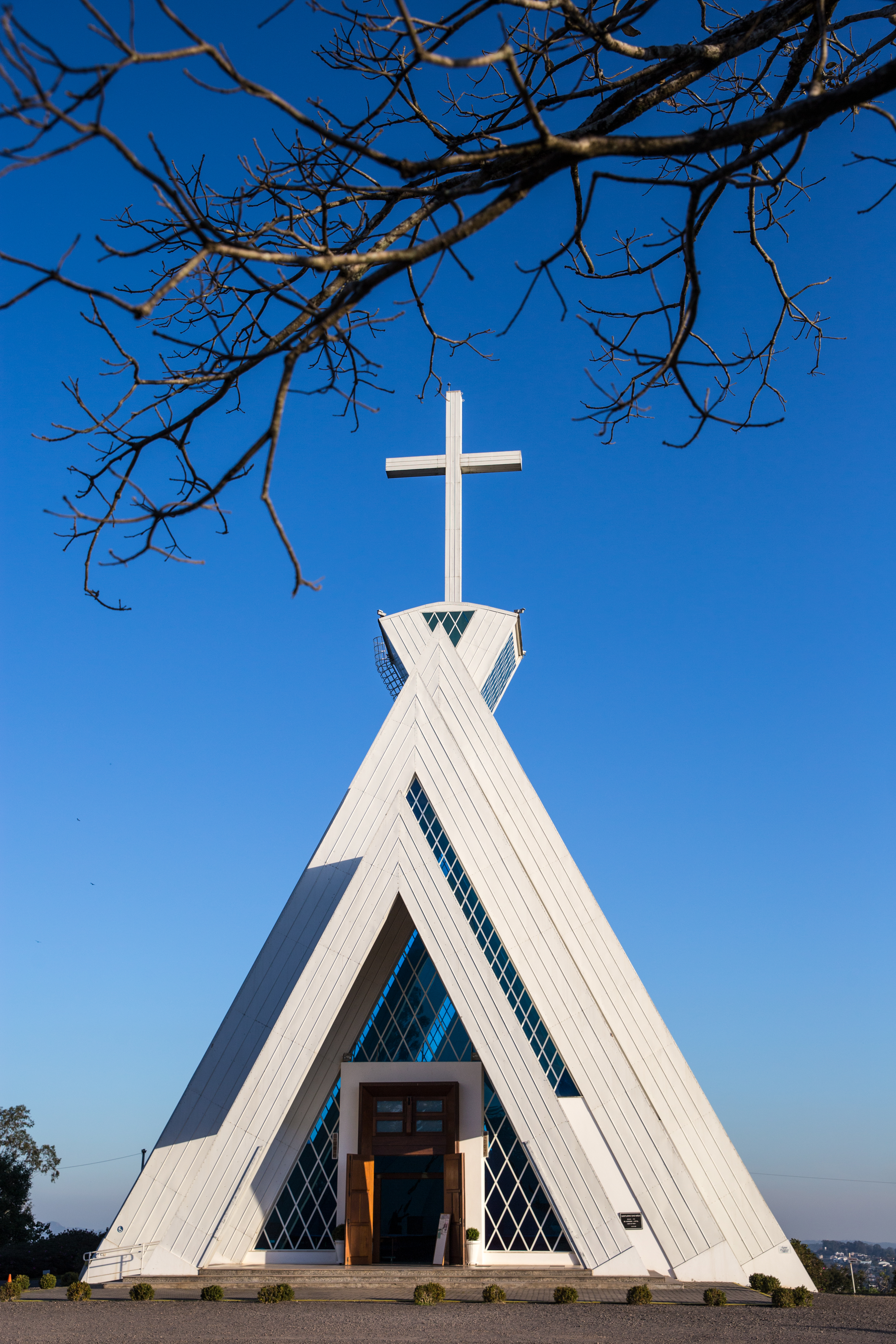
Mother's Sanctuary

Novo Hamburgo is one of 13 cities on the Rota Romântica, a scenic corridor of Brazilian cities in the state of Rio Grande do Sul with heavy Germanic influence. Other cities on the corridor are São Leopoldo, Estância Velha, Ivoti, Dois Irmãos, Morro Reuter, Santa Maria do Herval, Presidente Lucena, Picada Café, Nova Petrópolis, Gramado, Canela and São Francisco de Paula.

In the historical centre which is located in the Hamburgo Velho neighbourhood, there are still some half-timbered buildings constructed in the same technique, as the Community Schmitt-Presser Museum (first exemplary technique protected by IPHAN in Brazil). There are also the works of the German architect Ernst Seubert, some of his known buildings are the Church of Reis Magos (IECLB), the Church of Our Lady of Mercy, Bakery Reiss ("Padaria Reiss"), Schmitt House ("Casa Rosa") and Municipal Public Library Machado De Assis. Also noteworthy is the neoclassical building of the Ernesto Frederico Scheffel Foundation.

There is a "historic-cultural street" called Rua General Osório, along which there are dozens of historic buildings from various periods. Notable buildings along this street are the St. Catherine College, the building of the former Frohsin Society, designed by the German architect Theo Wiederspahn, the homes of the families Richter, Klein, Momberger, Snel, and Grunner, This street is recognized by the City Master Plan as an area of historical and cultural interest.

The downtown area has landmarks such as the Monument to the Shoemaker, Cathedral Basilica of St. Louis Gonzaga, and the Evangelical Lutheran Church of the Ascension, both historical constructions of the 1950s. The latter follows the Gothic style, with pure forms of the original Gothic architecture. There are also dozens of eclectic houses distributed among this historical area, but these are not officially recognized. The city also presents some interesting examples of modernism, especially residences built in the period 1950–1960.

=== Natural Attractions Lomba Grande ===
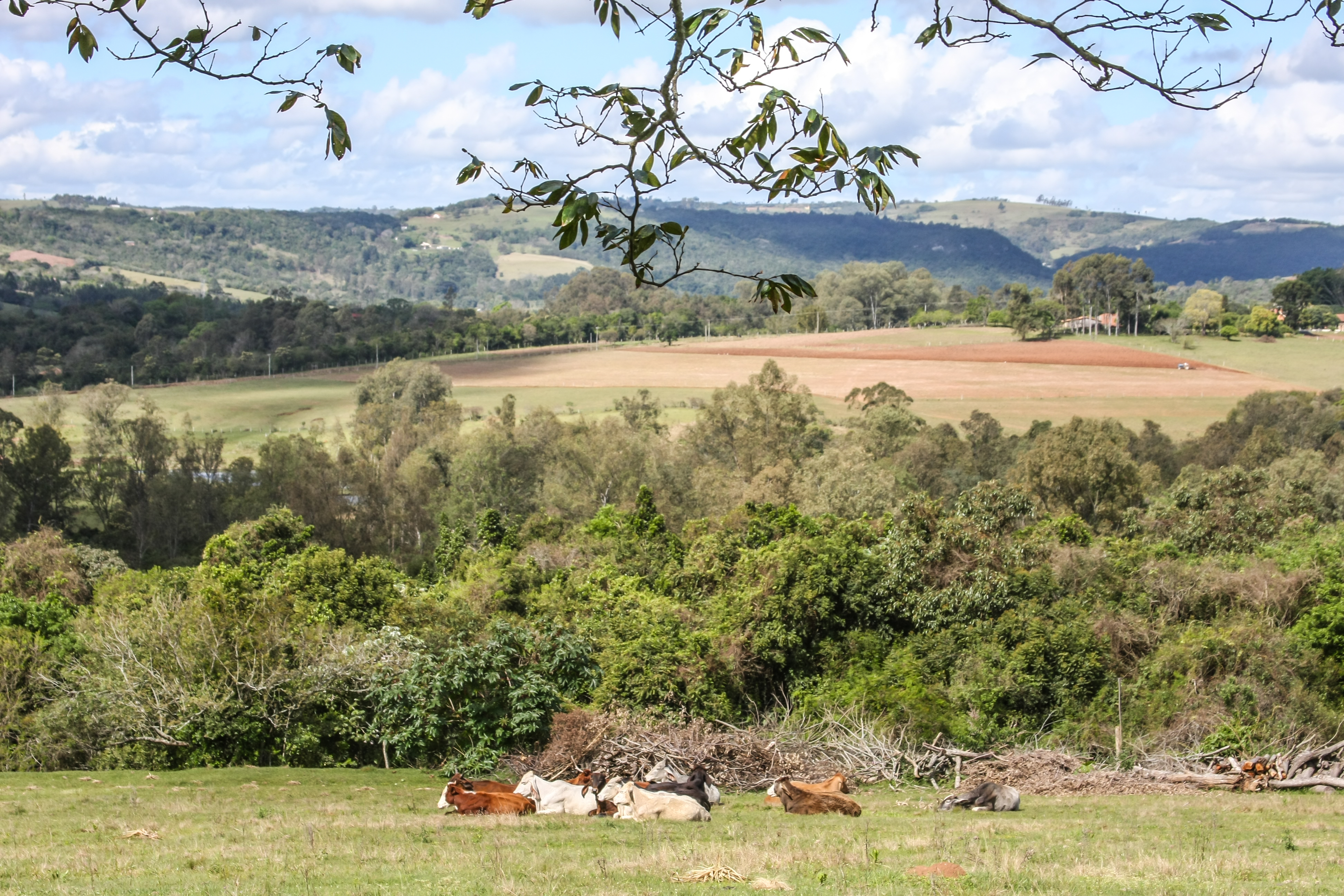
A farm in Lomba Grande

It is the Rural District of Novo Hamburgo, occupied an area of 156 square kilometers, making a total of two thirds of the municipal area. It is considered environmentally protected area where the wetlands of the Sinos River is very important for the preservation of the ecosystem, both fauna as flora.

Lomba Grande also received the first German immigrants who settled in the Hemp Linen factory, then owned by the municipality of São Leopoldo. Today provides one of the main points of visiting the city, where the natural attractions of the neighborhood next to developments designed for leisure and tourism attracts many tourists. They are horse racing, recreational sites, resorts, environmental education center, allowing tourists to enjoy outdoor activities such as horseback riding, adventure tourism, contact with animals, recreation, swimming pools, mountain biking, among a host of other activities.

Also in Lomba Grande that are harvested without pesticides the horticultural trade shows that cater to the rural producer in some properties of family farms and cooperatives produce colonial products and integrals. There are restaurants offering food fresh from the colonial neighborhood itself. The neighborhood also has many cultural attractions such as churches, cemeteries and a roadmap that includes visits to artists.

== Economy and society ==
The German craftsmen eventually started to manufacture shoes and machinery on a large scale and in the 1960s began to export goods, a process that transformed the city into a magnet for internal immigrants from impoverished areas around the state and the country. This caused significant demographic growth that was not accompanied by the infrastructure needed to accommodate the recently arrived population; favelas then formed. Today's Novo Hamburgo depends heavily upon shoe exports, although it diversified its industrial and commercial base in the early 1990s.

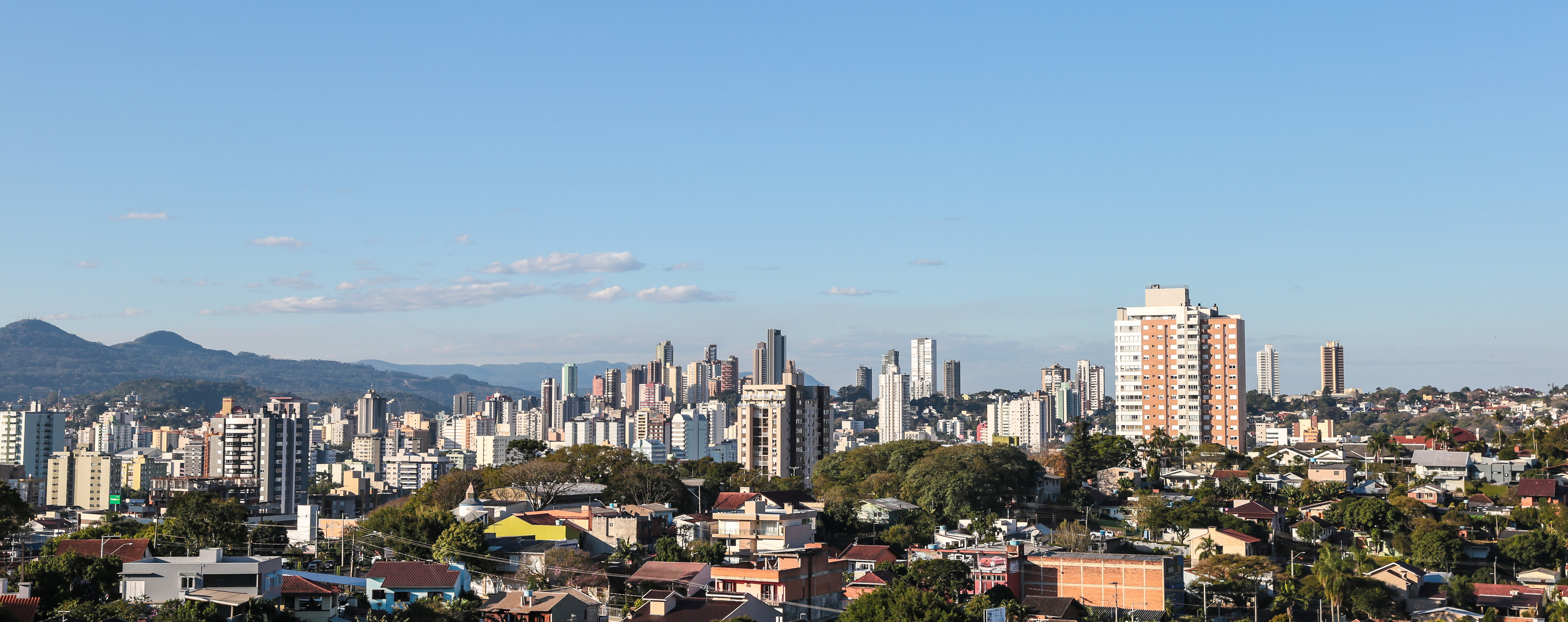
Panoramic view of Novo Hamburgo

== Media ==
=== Newspapers ===
In 1918 the first newspaper called the Monoclo was registered and circulated, the paper was directed by Arnaldo Mayer and distributed on Saturdays. This newspaper had a short life, lasting only nine issues. This was during the period in which Hamburguer Berg was still a district of São Leopoldo. There are reports that the Monoclo had an important role in the fight for emancipation of Novo Hamburgo city, despite having closed its activities before Novo Hamburgo was emancipated.

The 5 Abril newspaper is considered the first newspaper published in the city of Novo Hamburgo. It was set up by Leopoldo Petry who decided to create the newspaper to defend the interests of the city. The 5 Abril newspapers were published weekly in Portuguese, but with advertising in German. The newspaper lasted 35 years, completing 1811 editions. There were four pages per issue and 200 to 300 copies were distributed each week. These were significant numbers for the period, given that the German language was predominant among the 8,500 inhabitants. Over the next 30 to 50 years, there were several newspapers that began publishing in Novo Hamburgo such as:

- The Novo Hamburgo newspaper directed by Anthony Benfica Filho,
- The Intriga newspaper (1931).
- Pau na Nunca newspaper (1931);
- Gazeta Novo Hamburgo, led by Octavian Barreto de Borba (1934);
- Gazeta newspaper (1948);
- Evolucao newspaper (1953);
- Correio Gaucho (1955);
- Jornal NH (1960).

The development of "gaúcho" journalism generated opportunities for the creation of new newspapers in such as the Jornal SL in 1957 in São Leopoldo and Jornal NH, in 1960 in Novo Hamburgo. Today, with more than 250,000 inhabitants, Novo Hamburgo is the seventh most populated city in the state. Jornal NH is the largest newspaper in the region, one of the largest published in the state and the largest newspaper in Brazil outside a major metropolitan area, by number of subscribers. Jornal NH is part of Grupo Sinos, a conglomerate of regional newspapers, magazines, radio and digital content.

=== Radio ===
The first broadcast in Novo Hamburgo was Radio Hamburguense Progresso in 1948, directed by Milton Vergara Corrêa. The city currently has 4 radio stations, all in FM: ABC 103.3 FM, União FM 105.3, Alegria FM 92.9, 88.7 FM and Felicidade FM 90.3.

=== Television ===
The city has two local TV channels, both broadcast by cable by the Claro operator: Vale TV and TV Feevale. Vale TV is a community TV channel available in Novo Hamburgo and neighboring cities that airs programming produced locally in the city. TV Feevale is a TV channel belonging to Feevale University. It is a local affiliate of Futura that broadcasts primarily educational programming, in addition to local news.

== Sport ==
Esporte Clube Novo Hamburgo is major football team in town. It is affectionately known as the Anilado among fans. The club disputes mainly the Campeonato Gaúcho, but it has competed regularly in the Campeonato Brasileiro Série D. The club was founded on 1 May 1911 by a group of employees of the extinct Adams shoe factory. Since then, the Hamburguenses could watch in the victories of team the Santa Rosa Stadium. The stadium was sold in 2005, and a new stadium was built in 2011, called Estádio do Vale. The team's biggest achievement was to win the 2017 Campeonato Gaúcho, the first time since 2000 that a team that wasn't Porto Alegre's powerhouses Grêmio and Internacional won the championship.

Tennis is another sport very important in Novo Hamburgo. The city featured athletes like Fernando Roese, Paulo Taicher, Tomas Behrend, André Heller and André Ghem.

There are some places that offer tennis courts and host sport competitions such as Sociedade Ginástica, Aliança and Wallau Centro de Esportes.

In the city, it is also possible to practice or attend games and competitions in tennis, volleyball, punhobol, futsal, archery, handball, bicycle motocross, among other activities.

== Metro ==
The history of the railways of Rio Grande do Sul date back to 1866 with proposals for construction in the Sinos River Valley region. On 14 April 1874, the first train track between Porto Alegre and São Leopoldo was completed. This was constructed by a British Company called The Porto Alegre & New Hamburg Brazilian Railway Company Limited. Owned by Johan Mac Ginity.

The first train arrived in Novo Hamburgo on 1 January 1876. The station was named Novo Hamburgo Station. The railway did not go through the village of Hamburguer Berg, the station was built some 3 km away thus, a new urban area began to develop around the railway station. Only in 1882 the Novo Hamburgo station was connected at the village which was named as Hamburguer Berg, this line eventually was extended to Canela in 1922.

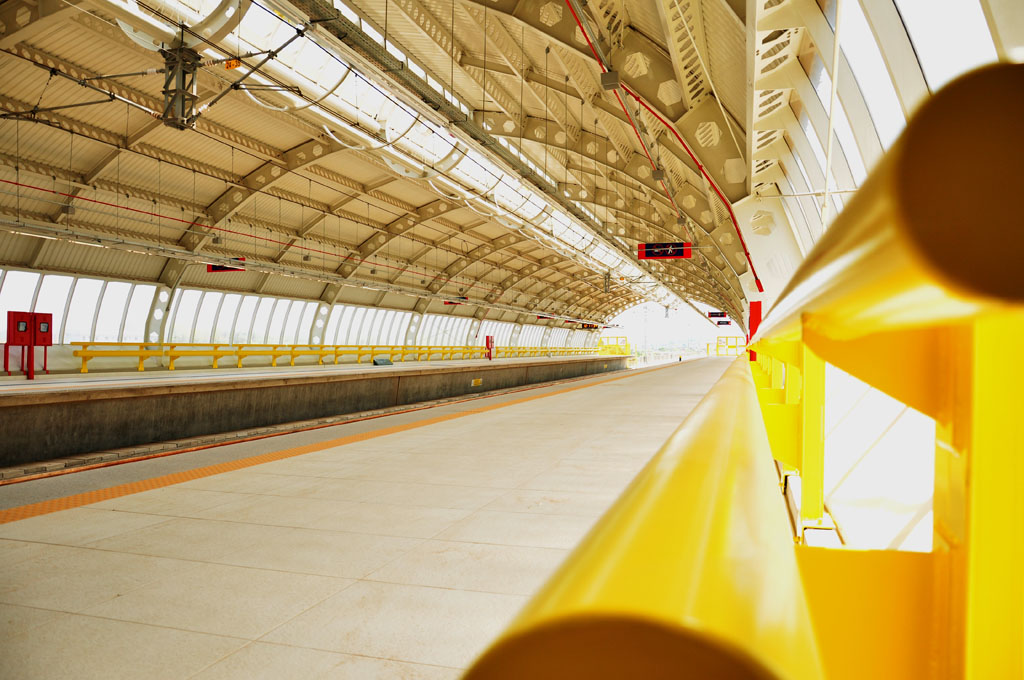
Santo Afonso Trensurb station in Novo Hamburgo

In 1919, the Novo Hamburgo station was renamed Borges de Medeiros, reflecting the anti-German sentiment caused by Great War and also Hamburg Berg was renamed Genuine Sampaio. However, Novo Hamburgo station returned to the original name in 1920 and Hamburguer Berg received its current name of Hamburgo Velho.

In 1964, the Novo Hamburgo to Taquara line was closed, leaving Novo Hamburgo station as the end point of the line. In late 1966, the rest of section, Rio dos Sinos to Novo Hamburgo stations was abolished and the station was deactivated.

In 2008 the Federal government authorized the expansion of Porto Alegre Metro train services to Novo Hamburgo. The works started in early 2009 and is expected to be completed 2013. This project includes the construction of an additional 9.3 kilometres and four new stations: Rio dos Sinos, in the municipality of São Leopoldo, Liberdade, Fenac and Novo Hamburgo, in the city of Novo Hamburgo.

== Notable people ==
- Maicon (born 1981), football player
- Muriel Gustavo Becker (born 1987), football player
- César Ramos (born 1989), racing driver
- Alisson Becker (born 1992), football goalkeeper
- Matheus Leist (born 1998), racing driver
- Arthur Leist (born 2001), racing driver

== See also ==
- List of municipalities in Rio Grande do Sul
