= Monument to the Shoemaker =

Sculpture in Novo Hamburgo, Rio Grande do Sul

Coordinates: 29.6835°S 51.134°W

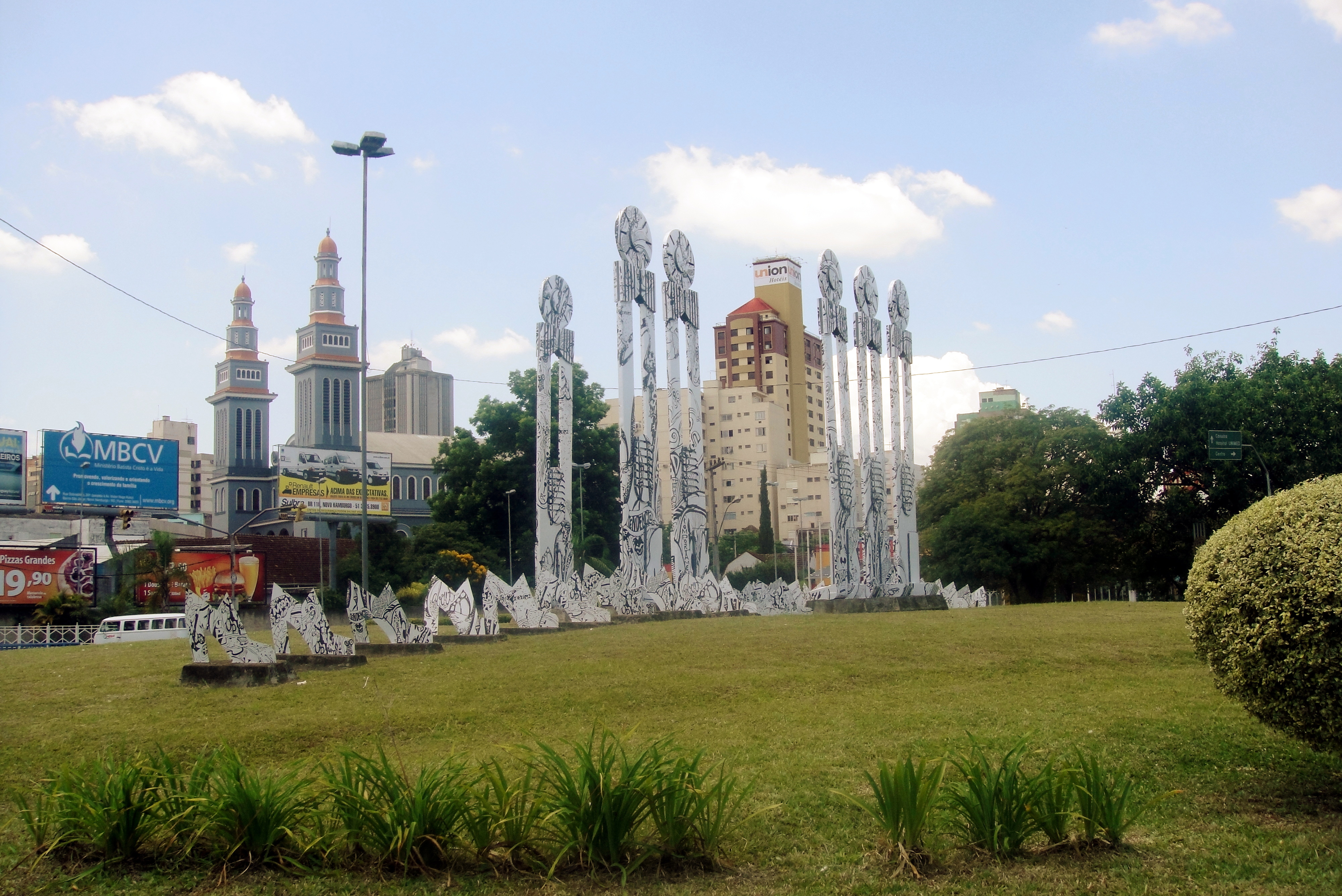
Monument to Shoemaker

The Monument to the Shoemaker (Portuguese: Monumento Ao Sapateiro) is a public sculpture in Novo Hamburgo, southern Brazil. It was designed by the artist Flávio Scholles in homage to the workers of shoe factories in Novo Hamburgo, and was inaugurated on 1 May 1979. The sculpture is located on a roundabout at the junction of Av. Nações Unidas and Av. Nicolau Becker.

The six vertical elements represent the six days the workers worked each week, under an eight-hour clock, representing eight hours a day working on the production lines.
