= Evangelical Lutheran Church of the Ascension =

Lutheran church in Novo Hamburgo, Brazil

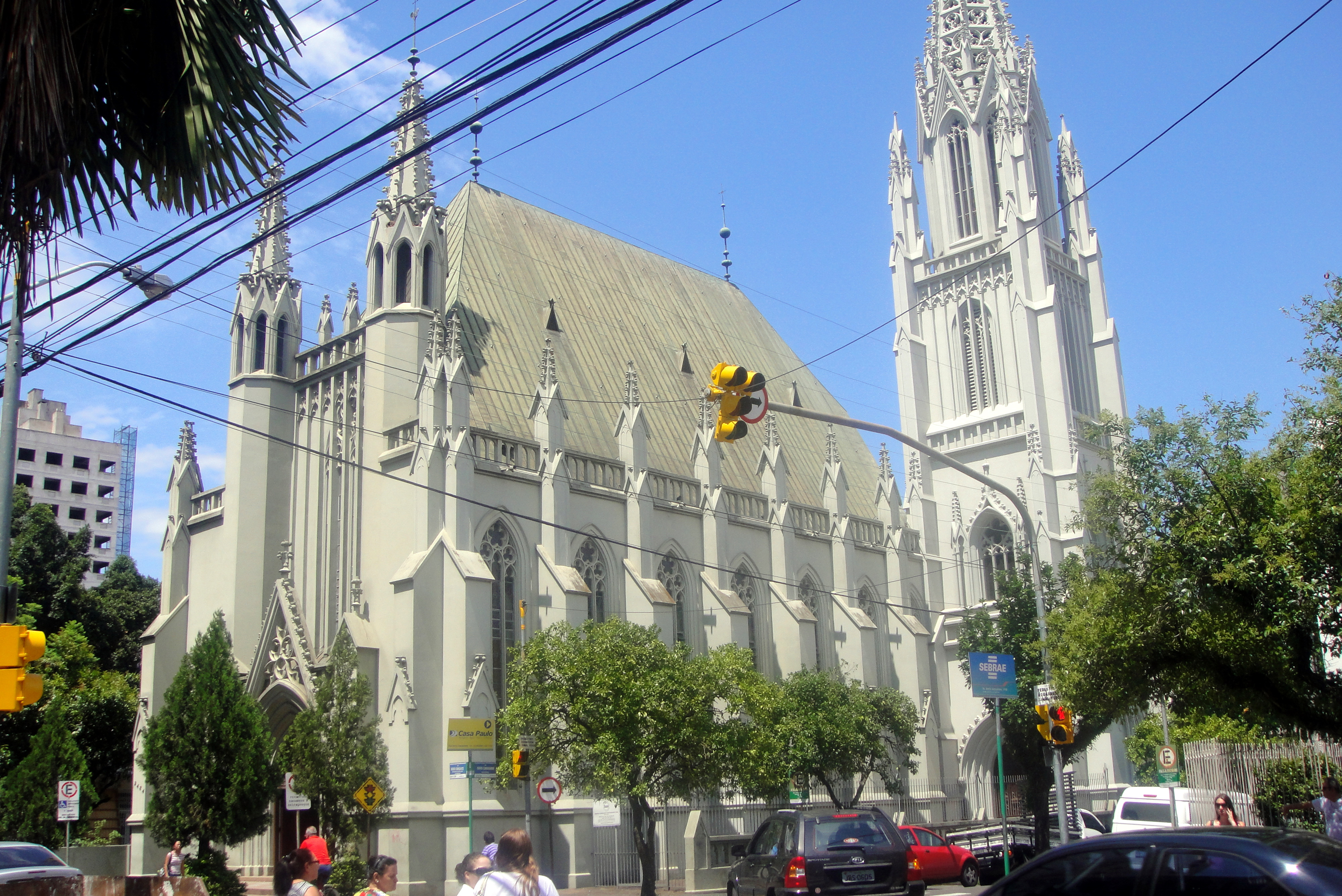
Evangelical Lutheran Church Ascension

Evangelical Lutheran Church of the Ascension (or more formally Accession Church) the first temple was built in 1895 and was founded on October 7, 1951. The building is situated in Novo Hamburgo with 476.48 meters square, built in neo-Gothic style; the architectural molds are from Cologne city in Germany. The vaults and arches of the temple are 14 meters high and the main tower is 58 meters. The tower houses two bells of steel brought from Germany in 1923. The windows on the altar in the center depict the rise of Jesus Christ.
