= Church of Our Lady of Mercy (Novo Hamburgo) =

Church in Rio Grande do Sul, Brazil

Church of Our Lady of Mercy (Portuguese: Paróquia Nossa Senhora da Piedade) is located in Novo Hamburgo, state of Rio Grande do Sul, Brazil. The church was built between 1850 and 1886, during the Empire of Brazil. The current building was previously a former chapel whose facade is from 1936. There was a fire in the building in 2003, which required a renovation.

The church is a parish in the Diocese of Novo Hamburgo.
