= Municipal Public Library Machado De Assis =

- Biblioteca Pública Municipal Machado de Assis
- Location: Rio Grande do Sul, Brazil
- Established: 1982

The Municipal Public Library Machado de Assis is located in Novo Hamburgo, Rio Grande do Sul state, Brazil. Built in 1908, in the Gothic German style, the building was originally the Evangelical School (1909 to 1921) and was later occupied by several families. The building was converted to public property in 1978, and on February 18, 1982, it was reopened as the permanent home of the municipal public library.

== See also ==
- List of libraries in Brazil
