= Universidade Feevale =

University in Novo Hamburgo, Brazil

Feevale University
- Universidade Feevale
- Motto: Conhecimento para inovar o mundo
- Motto in English: Knowledge to innovate the world
- Type: Private, community, non-profit
- Established: June 28, 1969
- Rector: José Paulo da Rosa
- Vice rectors: Inajara Vargas Ramos, Cleber Cristiano Prodanov, Angelita Renck Gerhardt, Alexandre Zeni
- Academic staff: 1450
- Students: 10,000
- Location: Novo Hamburgo, Rio Grande do Sul, Brazil; 29°39′54″S 51°07′12″W
- Campus: Urban
- Colors: Amazon Green, Dark Green and Medium Yellow
- Website: www.feevale.br

The Universidade Feevale (Feevale University) (Feevale) is a Brazilian university in the city of Novo Hamburgo (Vale do Rio dos Sinos, the largest shoe manufacturing center of the country) in the metropolitan region of Porto Alegre, Rio Grande do Sul. The selection process is through an entrance exam and continuous assessment.

It is a community entity, non-profit, with didactic autonomy, scientific, administrative, and disciplinary. Through the teaching of undergraduate, postgraduate, research, and extension, Feevale educates citizens.

== History ==
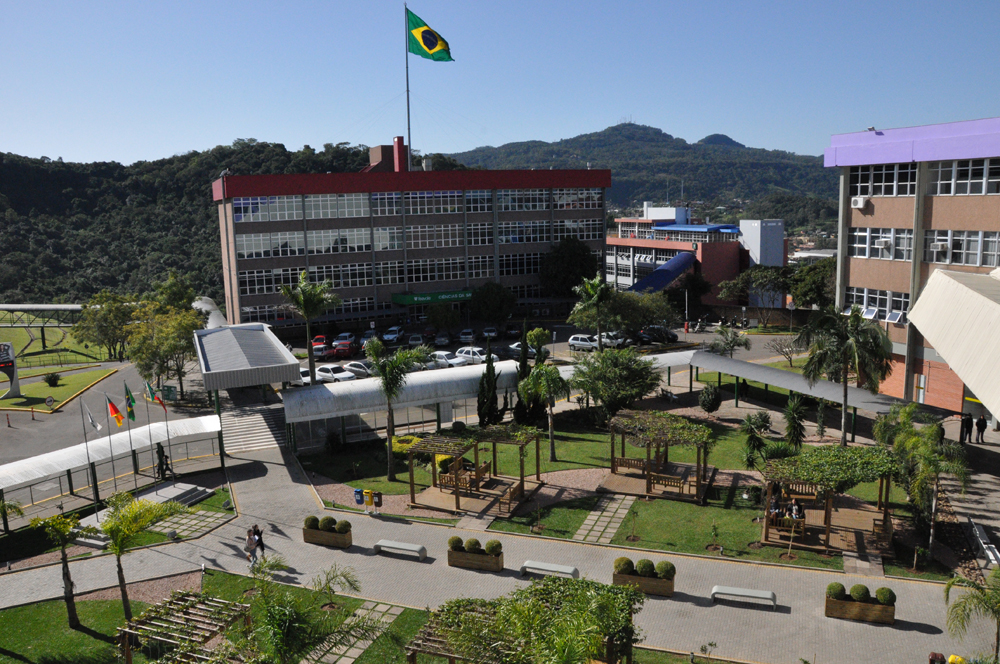
Red Building, Campus II.

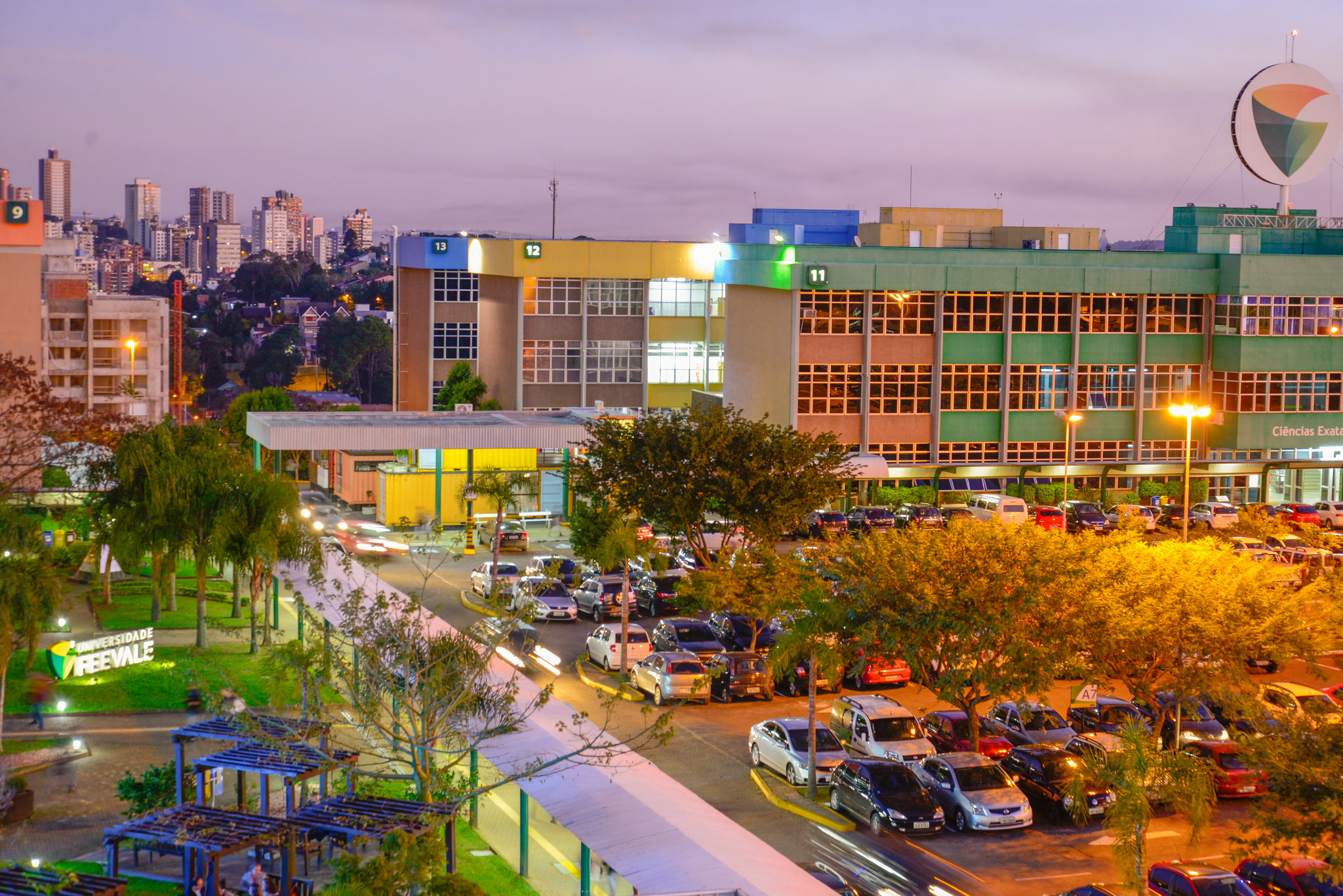
Campus II.

On June 28, 1969 founded the Associação Pró-Ensino Superior em Novo Hamburgo (Aspeur), maintainer of Feevale under the name Federação de Estabelecimentos de Ensino Superior em Novo Hamburgo (Federation of Institutions of Higher Education in Novo Hamburgo).

On July 21, 1999, the Centro Universitário Feevale acquired university autonomy through the approval of the Minister of Education Paulo Renato Souza. Thereafter, the projects of the institution could be developed more rapidly, providing opportunities for the achievement of desired objectives.

A major achievement occurred on April 5, 2010, when Novo Hamburgo celebrated its 83 years of political emancipation when it was published in the Diário oficial (Official Gazette), an ordinance of the Ministry of Education, accrediting the University Center as Universidade Feevale (Feevale University). The news was expected by the academic community and the municipality for at least five years.

== Student life ==
Feevale has approximately 18 000 students in all levels of education, and 1450 teachers. It has two campuses: Campus I is on Avenue Dr. Maurício Cardoso, 510, Hamburgo Velho neighborhood, and Campus II in RS-239, 2755, Vila Nova neighborhood.

== Education ==
=== Undergraduation ===
Offers 38 undergraduate courses:

==== Health Sciences ====
- Biomedical Sciences
- Biological Sciences
- Pharmacology
- Technological Course in Gastronomy
- Technological Course in Hospital Management
- Physical Education
- Physical Education – major in Teaching
- Medicine
- Nursing
- Physiotherapy
- Nutrition
- Chiropractic

==== Pure and technological sciences ====
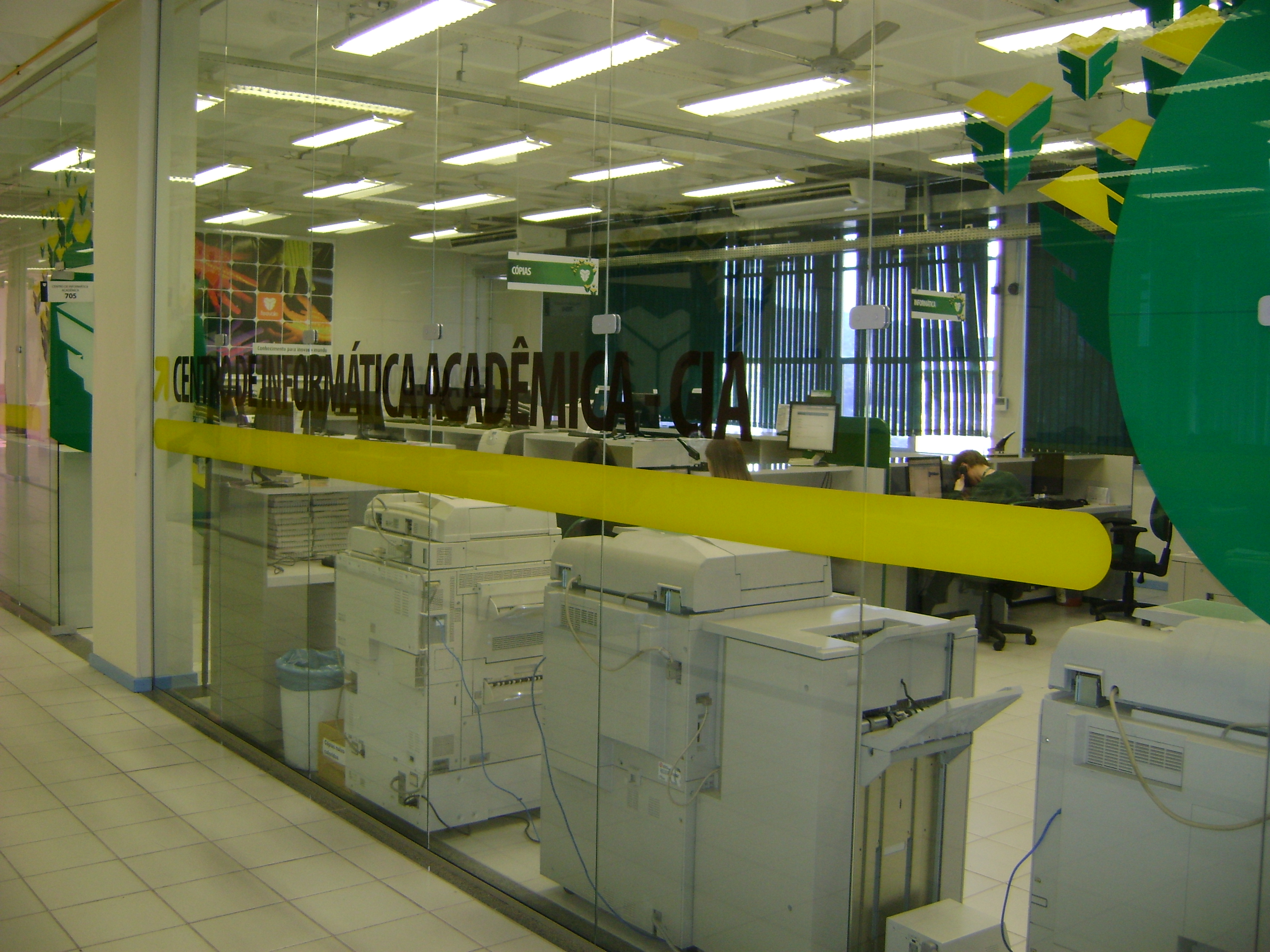
Center for Academic Computing

- Architecture and Urban Planning
- Computer Science
- Computer Science – major in Teaching
- Buildings’ Construction Technology
- Environmental Management Technology
- Internet Systems Technology
- Design
- Design – emphasis on Fashion and Technology
- Production Engineering
- Electronics Engineering
- Mechanical Engineering
- Chemistry Engineering
- Information Systems

==== Human Sciences ====
- Visual Arts
- Arts – Major in Teaching
- History
- Languages – major in English and Portuguese
- Education
- Psychology
- Special Program in Teaching Formation

==== Institute of Applied Social Sciences ====
- Business and Administration
- Accounting
- Journalism
- Advertising
- Public Relations
- Technological Course in International Business
- Technological Course in Finances
- Technological Course in Digital Games
- Technological Course in Human Resources
- Law
- Tourism

== Award ==
The Feevale received the National Award for Educational Management 2008, with the project "Geographic information system applied to the administration of the campuses I and II of the University Feevale. The institution was the only finalist from Rio Grande do Sul, competing alongside five other university in the country — two from Santa Catarina and three from São Paulo. The National Confederation of Education Institutions and Humus Consultancy, responsible for the award, received 35 entries from schools all over Brazil, who presented their projects and successful cases in academic management, social responsibility, people, and financial-economic.

== More information ==
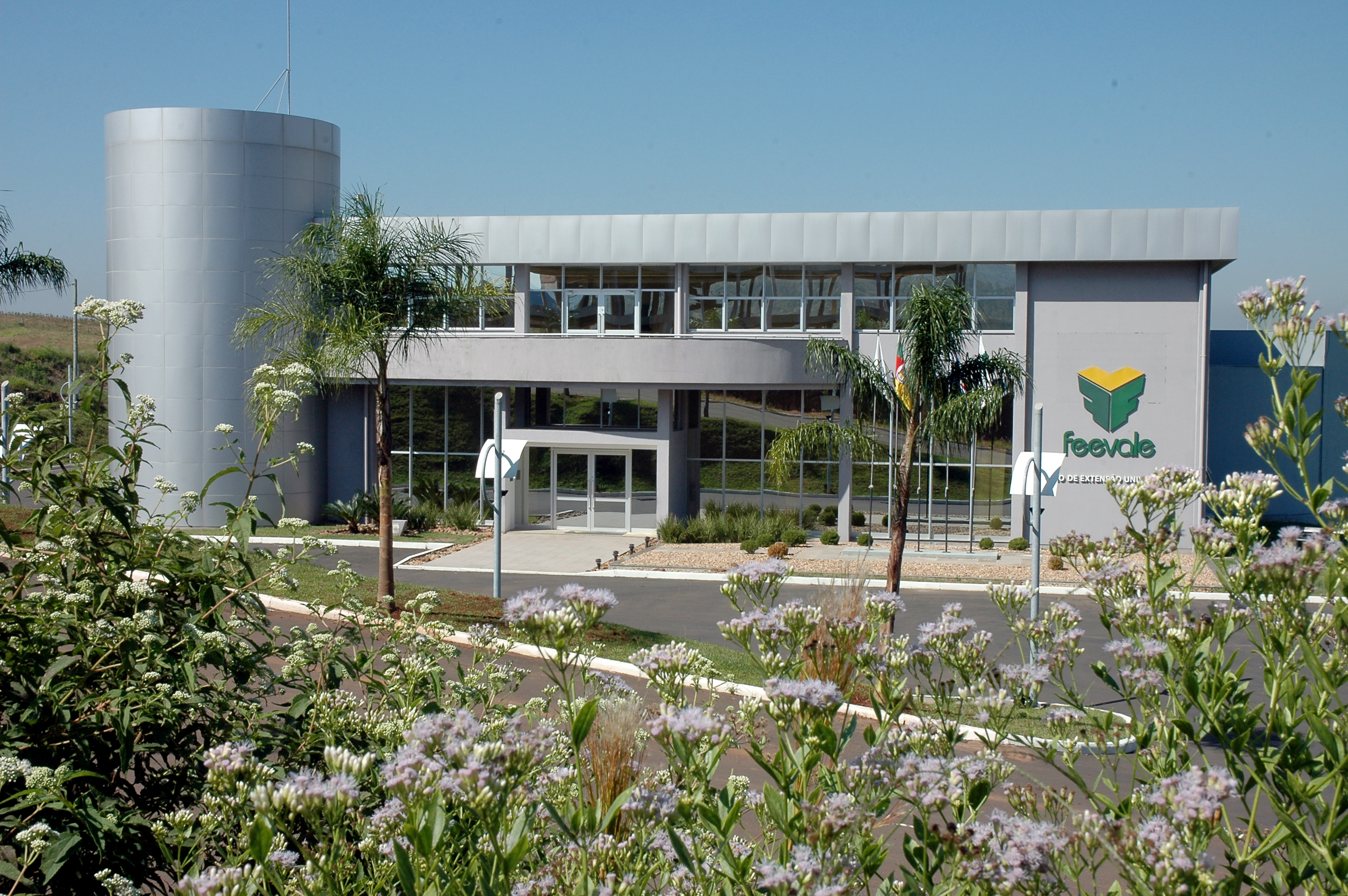
University Extension Center

- 1 Course Specific Higher Education - Production Management
- 1 Special Program of Pedagogical Education of Teachers
- 48 post-graduation lato sensu (specialization)
- 3 post-graduate studies (Master)
- A course of post-graduate studies (PhD)
- 25 scientific research groups, with 138 projects in execution
- Partnership with 54 institutions in 17 countries
- 48 extension projects

== See also ==
- Brazil University Rankings
- Universities and Higher Education in Brazil
