= Hamburgo Velho =

Historical district in Novo Hamburgo, Brazil

Coordinates: 29.6748°S 51.1112°W

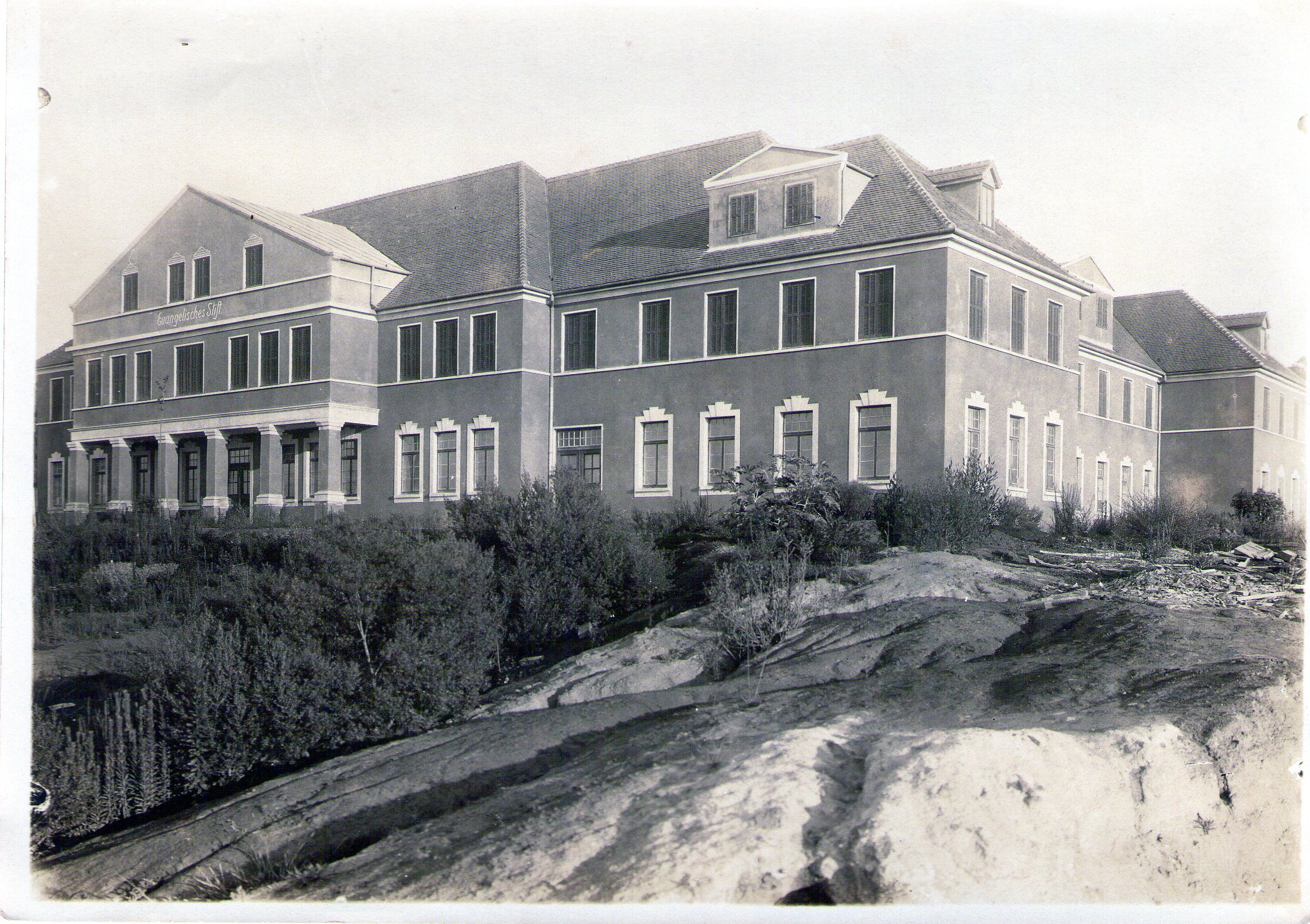

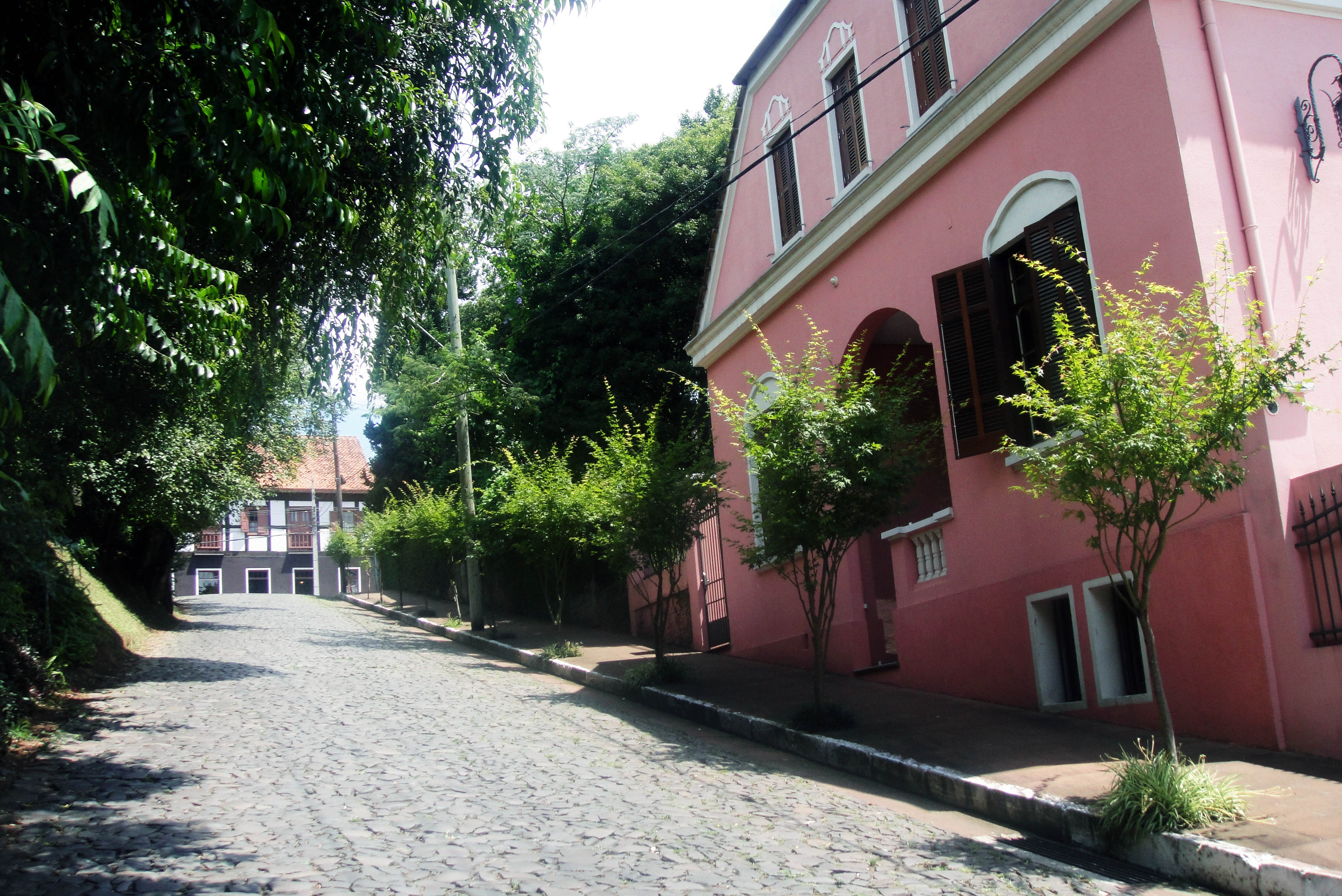

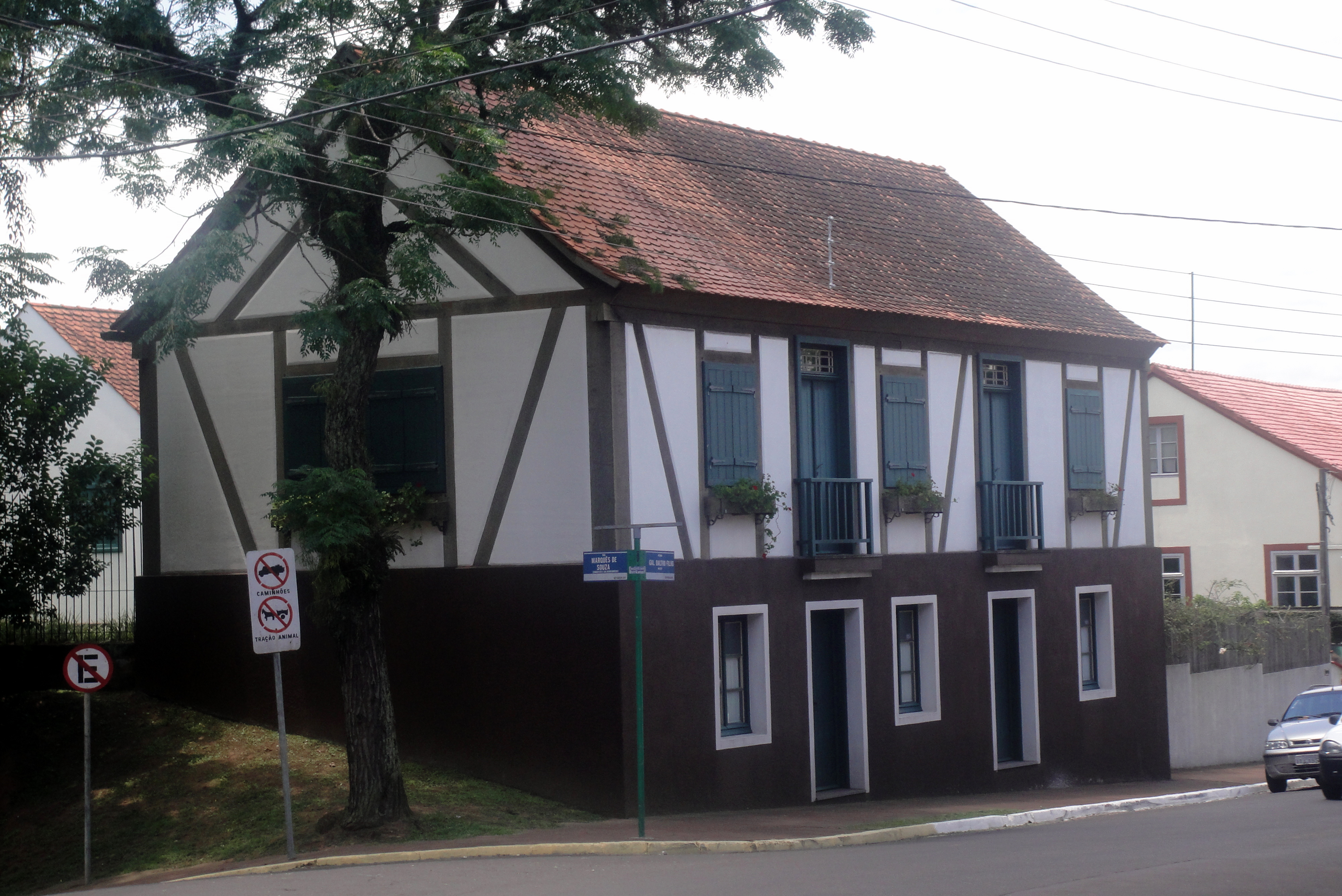

Hamburgo Velho (originally Hamburguer Berg) is considered the historical district of Novo Hamburgo, Brazil.
