= Sinos River basin =

River basin in Rio Grande do Sul, Brazil

The Sinos River basin is situated Northeast of the state of Rio Grande do Sul, Southern Brazil, covering two geomorphologic provinces: the Southern plateau and central depression. It is territory of the Guaíba basin and has an area of almost 800 km2, consisted 32 municipalities. Named after Sinos River.
