= Ernst Theodor Lechler =

German theologian, educator and Missionary

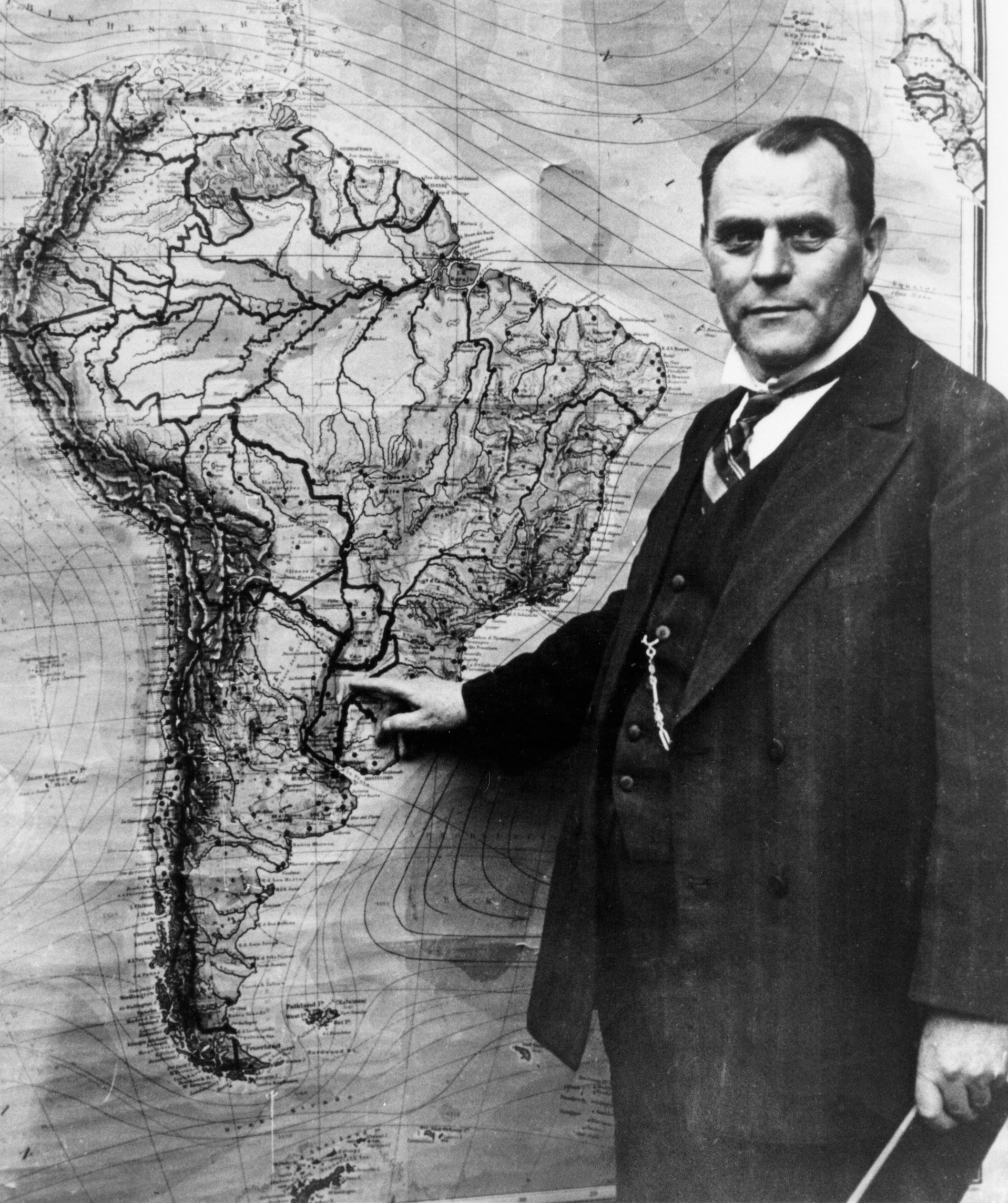
- Ernst Theodor Lechler at the Kirchliches Auslandsseminar in Schloss Ilsenburg
- Born: 23 June 1872; Esslingen am Neckar, Germany
- Died: 18 January 1950 (aged 77); Stetten am Heuchelberg, Germany
- Occupations: Lutheran theologian, missionary, educator, scout leader

Ernst Theodor Lechler (23 June 1872 – 18 January 1950) was a German Lutheran theologian, missionary to Brazil, educator, and scout leader.

== Early life and education ==
Lechler was born in Esslingen am Neckar, son of pastor Christian Lechler and Bertha Marie Ernestine Schütz. Due to health problems, he was initially homeschooled before attending schools in Esslingen and Stuttgart. He studied theology in Tübingen, Erlangen, and Leipzig. His personal curriculum (Lebenslauf) written in 1898 describes these stages.

== Mission in Brazil ==
In 1898 he was sent by the Protestant Foreign Mission to Brazil. He first served in Três Forquilhas (now Itati, Rio Grande do Sul).

He promoted literacy and founded a bilingual choir for the Afro-Brazilian community. From 1907 to 1927, he worked in Santa Cruz do Sul, where he played a major role in local education.

== Educational work ==
Lechler was director of Colégio Mauá, a prominent Lutheran school in Santa Cruz do Sul.

== Scouting ==
In 1917 he was one of the co-founders of the "União dos Escoteiros do Brasil" in Porto Alegre, linked to the German Scouting movement.

== Resistance against Nazism ==
During the 1930s, Lechler taught at the Kirchliches Auslandsseminar, which had moved to Ilsenburg. He participated in church resistance activities against Nazi policies. The Evangelical Church in the Rhineland archive preserves photographs of Lechler from this period.
