= Salvador das Missões =

Municipality in Rio Grande do Sul, Brazil

Coordinates: 28°7′33″S 54°50′6″W

- Municipality
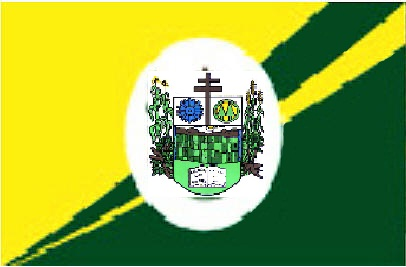
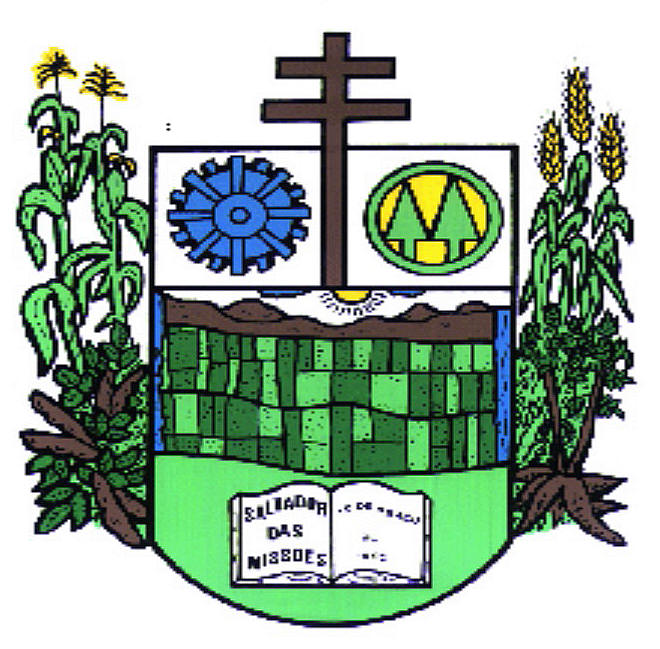
- Flag Coat of arms
- Interactive map of Salvador das Missões
- Country: Brazil
- Time zone: UTC−3 (BRT)

Salvador das Missões is a municipality in the state of Rio Grande do Sul, Brazil. As of 2020, the estimated population was 2,733.

== Regional language ==
Like many towns in the state which were first settled by German-speaking Europeans, the German language is still present in daily family and community life, if not as much in the public sphere since World War II; the regional German dialect is called Riograndenser Hunsrückisch, as it is a Brazilian variant of the dialect spoken in the Hunsrück region of southwest Germany. In 2012 the state chamber of deputies voted unanimously in favor of recognizing this German dialect an official historical culture good to be preserved.

== See also ==
- German-Brazilian
- List of municipalities in Rio Grande do Sul
