= Nicoletti =

- Language: Italian

Origin
- Language: Greek
- Origin: Νικόλαος (Nikolaos), a combination of Greek words "Victory" (nikē) and "People" (laos)
- Meaning: "victory of the people"

Nicoletti is an Italian surname derived from the Greek word Νικόλαος, meaning "victory of the people". Notable people with the surname include:

- Nicoletti (politician) (born 1981), Brazilian politician
- Charles "Chuckie" Nicoletti (1916–1977), American mobster
- Cynthia Nicoletti, American legal historian
- Dario Nicoletti (born 1967), Italian cyclist
- Davide Nicoletti, American ice hockey player
- Giuseppe Di Vittorio, pseudonym Nicoletti (1892–1957), Italian trade unionist and politician
- Joe Nicoletti, American politician
- Major Nicoletti, Italian-Brazilian revolutionary
- Julaika Nicoletti (born 1988), Italian shot putter
- Manfredi Nicoletti (1930–2017), Italian architect
- Manuel Nicoletti (born 1998), Italian footballer
- Michele Nicoletti (born 1956), Italian politician and philosopher
- Onorato Nicoletti (1872–1929), Italian mathematician
- Rudy Nicoletti (born Rodolfo Nicoletti, 1976), electronic music producer
- Susi Nicoletti (1918–2005), German-Dutch actress
- Walter Nicoletti (1952–2019), Italian footballer and manager

== Other ==
- Nicoletti Lake, a lake in the Province of Enna, Sicily, Italy
- Nicoletti assay, a method in cell biology named after Italian physician Ildo Nicoletti
