= 2024 Gramado Piper PA-42 crash =

Aviation accident in Brazil

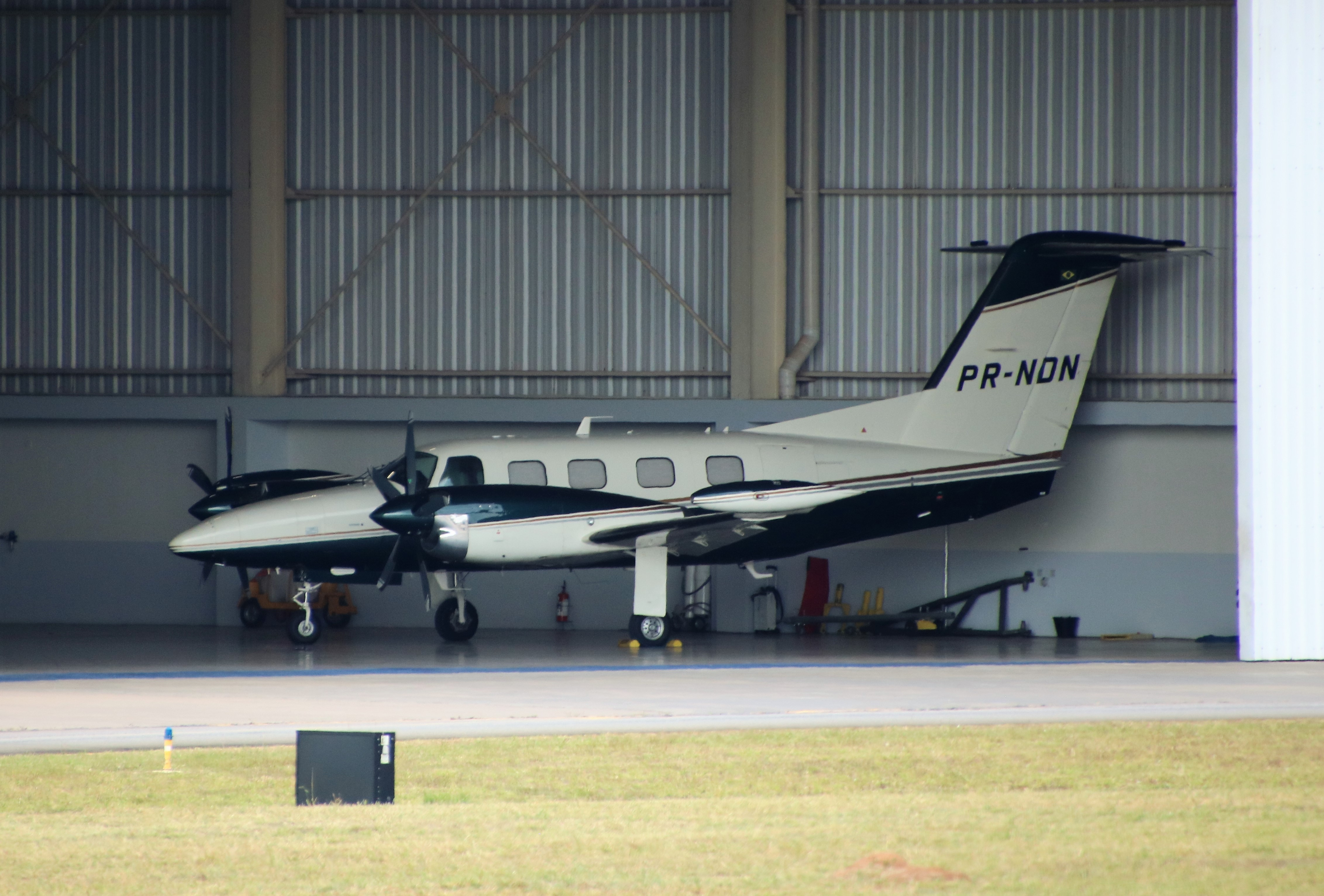
- PR-NDN, the aircraft involved, seen on 10 May 2021

Accident
- Date: 22 December 2024
- Summary: Crashed shortly after takeoff; under investigation
- Site: Gramado, Rio Grande do Sul, Brazil; 29°22′2.509″S 50°51′35.546″W
- Total fatalities: 10
- Total injuries: 17

Aircraft
- Aircraft type: Piper PA-42-1000 Cheyenne 400LS
- Operator: Galeazzi & Associados
- Registration: PR-NDN
- Flight origin: Canela Airport, Gramado, Brazil
- Destination: Jundiaí Airport, Jundiaí, Brazil
- Occupants: 10
- Passengers: 9
- Crew: 1
- Fatalities: 10
- Survivors: 0

Ground casualties
- Ground injuries: 17

On 22 December 2024, a Piper PA-42 Cheyenne crashed in the tourist city of Gramado, Rio Grande do Sul, Brazil, resulting in at least 10 fatalities and 17 injuries. The accident occurred shortly after takeoff when the aircraft collided with multiple structures in the resort town, causing significant damage and leading to fires that damaged several buildings.

== Aircraft ==
The aircraft involved in the accident was a twin engine Piper PA-42-1000 Cheyenne, which was manufactured in 1989 or 1990 by Piper Aircraft and was registered with ANAC with the registration PR-NDN. The aircraft involved had up-to-date documentation and had capacity for two crew members and nine passengers. The crashed aircraft was authorized to perform night flights, but was not authorized to perform air taxi operations.

== Accident ==
The accident occurred shortly after takeoff from Canela Airport at 9:12 a.m., with the aircraft traveling only approximately 3 kilometres (1.9 mi) before the accident. During takeoff, the aircraft flew into challenging weather conditions, with forecasts of overcast skies and fog in the area.

The aircraft reportedly struck a building's chimney in the mountainous resort town of Gramado in Rio Grande do Sul at around 9:13 a.m., followed by impacts with the second floor of a residential structure and a furniture store before colliding with a mobile phone store. Debris from the plane also struck a nearby inn. The accident sparked fires that contributed to many of the reported injuries including two critically injured women, primarily from smoke inhalation.

Local authorities, including the Civil Defense of Rio Grande do Sul and Public Security Department, coordinated the emergency response.

== Casualties ==
The plane was piloted by businessman and CEO of the Galeazzi & Associados business recovery firm Luiz Claudio Salgueiro Galeazzi, and was carrying nine members of his family. All of the occupants of the plane were killed in the accident.

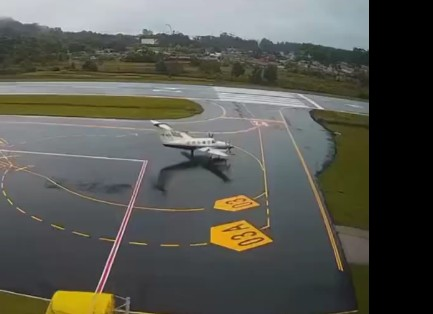
A CCTV still of PR-NDN shortly before takeoff

At least 17 people on the ground were reportedly injured with the majority reporting smoke inhalation, but two women were transported to the state capital Porto Alegre for burns.

== Investigation ==
The Aeronautical Accidents Investigation and Prevention Center (CENIPA) opened an investigation into the disaster.

== Responses ==
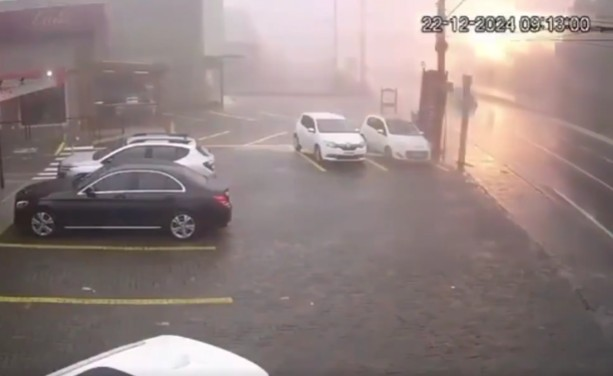
A CCTV still of a fireball rising from the accident site

Galeazzi & Associados, the company founded by the pilot, issued a statement on LinkedIn expressing gratitude for support received following the accident, and extended sympathy to those affected by the accident in the region.

Brazilian President Luiz Inácio Lula da Silva expressed his condolences to the victims on social media and stated that the crash would be investigated by the Brazilian Air Force with the support of the federal government.

The governor of Rio Grande do Sul Eduardo Leite went to the crash site to accompany the authorities' operation.
