= Natal Luz =

Christmas festival in Gramado, Brazil

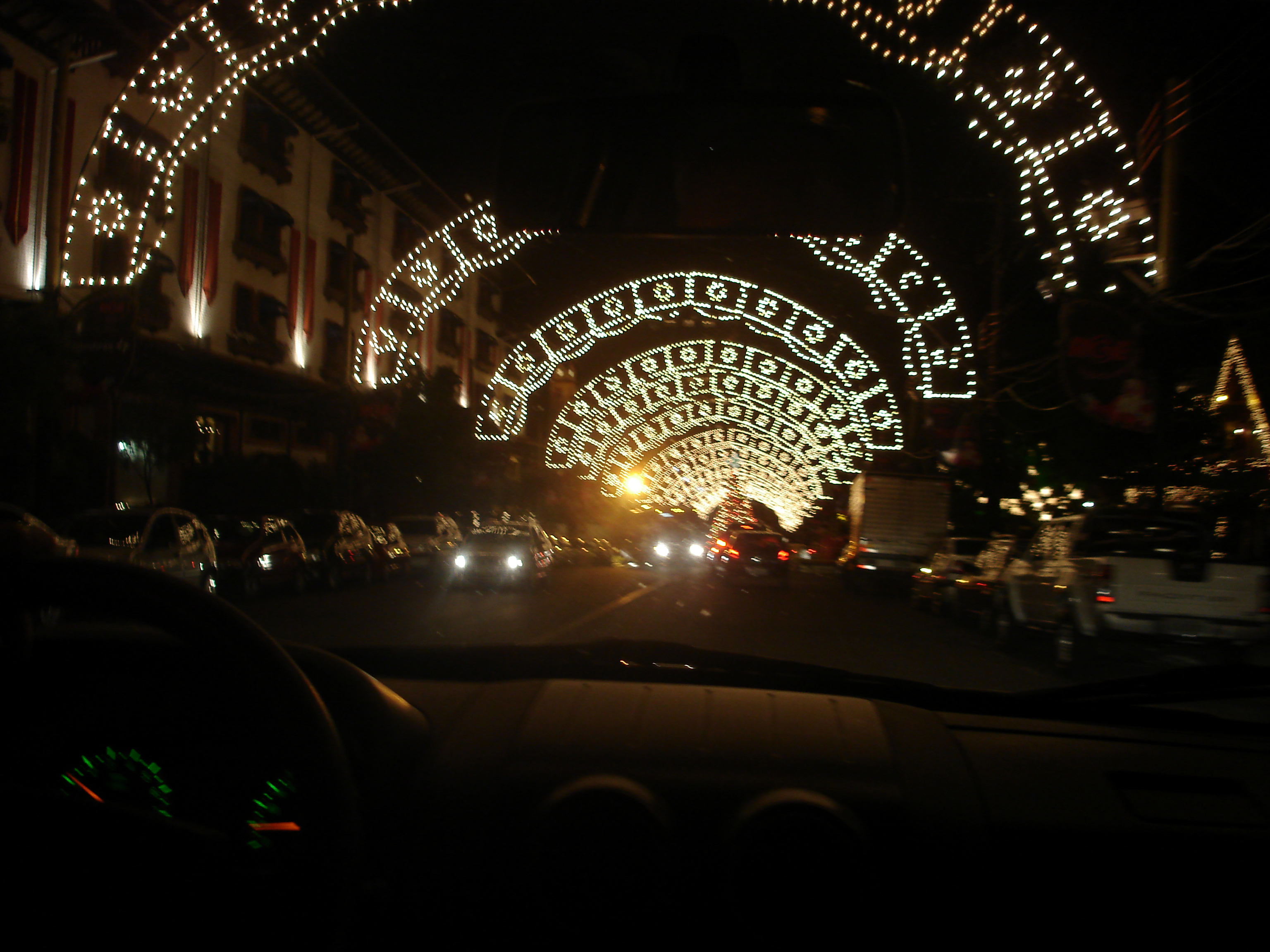
Natal Luz

Natal Luz, which means "Christmas of Lights" in Portuguese, is an annual Christmas festival in Gramado, Brazil. The festival began in 1986 as a small concert conducted by Eleazar de Carvalho, one of the country's most celebrated orchestra conductors. Over the years, it has grown into Brazil's largest ever Christmas event.

The Natal Luz is celebrated in Gramado, a city in Rio Grande do Sul. Gramado has been labeled the country's Christmas capital, an honor it has held for over 20 years. The celebration gathers around 1.5 million people every year and runs from November 12 to January 13, making it one of the longest Christmas festivals in the world.

== Highlights and attractions ==
The celebration of the Natal Luz consists of a wide array of events and attractions, including one that allows visitors to feel how it is to be inside a Christmas tree. The so-called magic Christmas tree is 99-foot tall and has over 3,500 ornaments, 2,600 string lights, 1,000 strobe lights, and an artificial snow machine. The festivities also include tree lighting shows, contests, games, parades, reindeer exhibits, musical performances, and dramatic readings of classic holiday plays, such as the “Fantastic Christmas Factory”, a musical about a child who was able to witness the wonders of Christmas coming to life.

One of the most anticipated events of the Natal Luz is the Nativitaten. Held at the center of the Joaquina Rita Bier Lake, the celebration involves a floating lights show, a performance by choirs, tenors, sopranos, and Brazil's musicians as well as circus acts, amid a display of fireworks . The performance is usually divided into five acts, which depict the journey of mankind throughout history, from the creation of the world, the birth of Jesus Christ, the coming of darkness, all the way through to the day of salvation.

Another event people look forward to is the Tannenbaumfest, where local Gramado business owners compete to create the most beautiful Christmas tree in the city. The trees are placed in the Avenida Borges de Medeiros for everyone to see. The decorated trees are evaluated by a panel of judges, and the winners are announced at an awarding ceremony in December. The trees are left on display until the end of the Natal Luz. There have also been special events during this three-month festival. The most notable of these happened in 2009, when 2,000 of the city's inhabitants worked hand-in-hand to create a jigsaw puzzle made from a million lamps. The jigsaw puzzle completion was celebrated with a pyrotechnic display, which used over 10,000 fireworks.

== See also ==
- List of music festivals in Brazil
- Christmas lights in Medellín
