= Gramado =

Town in Rio Grande do Sul, Brazil

- Municipality
- Municipality of Gramado
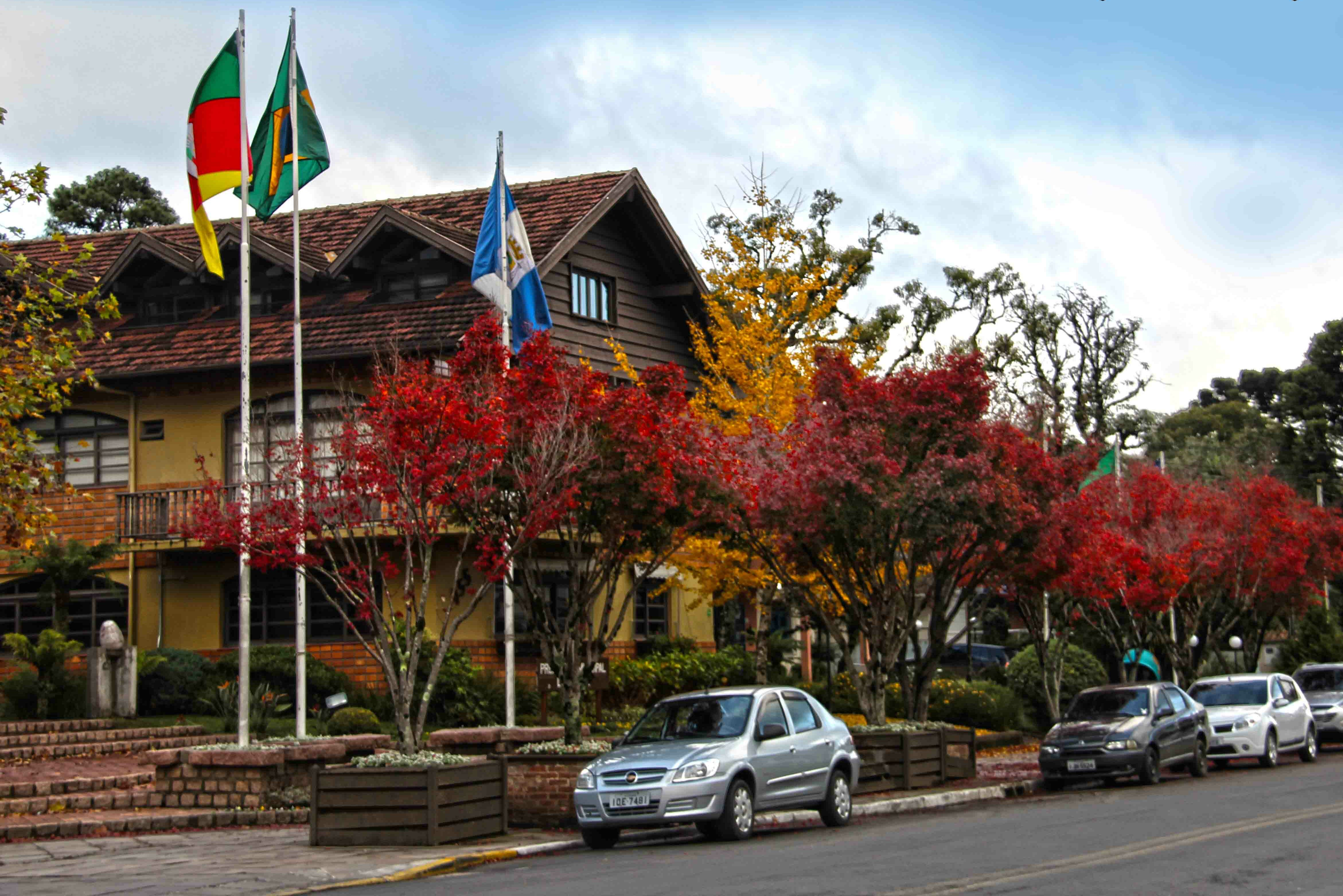
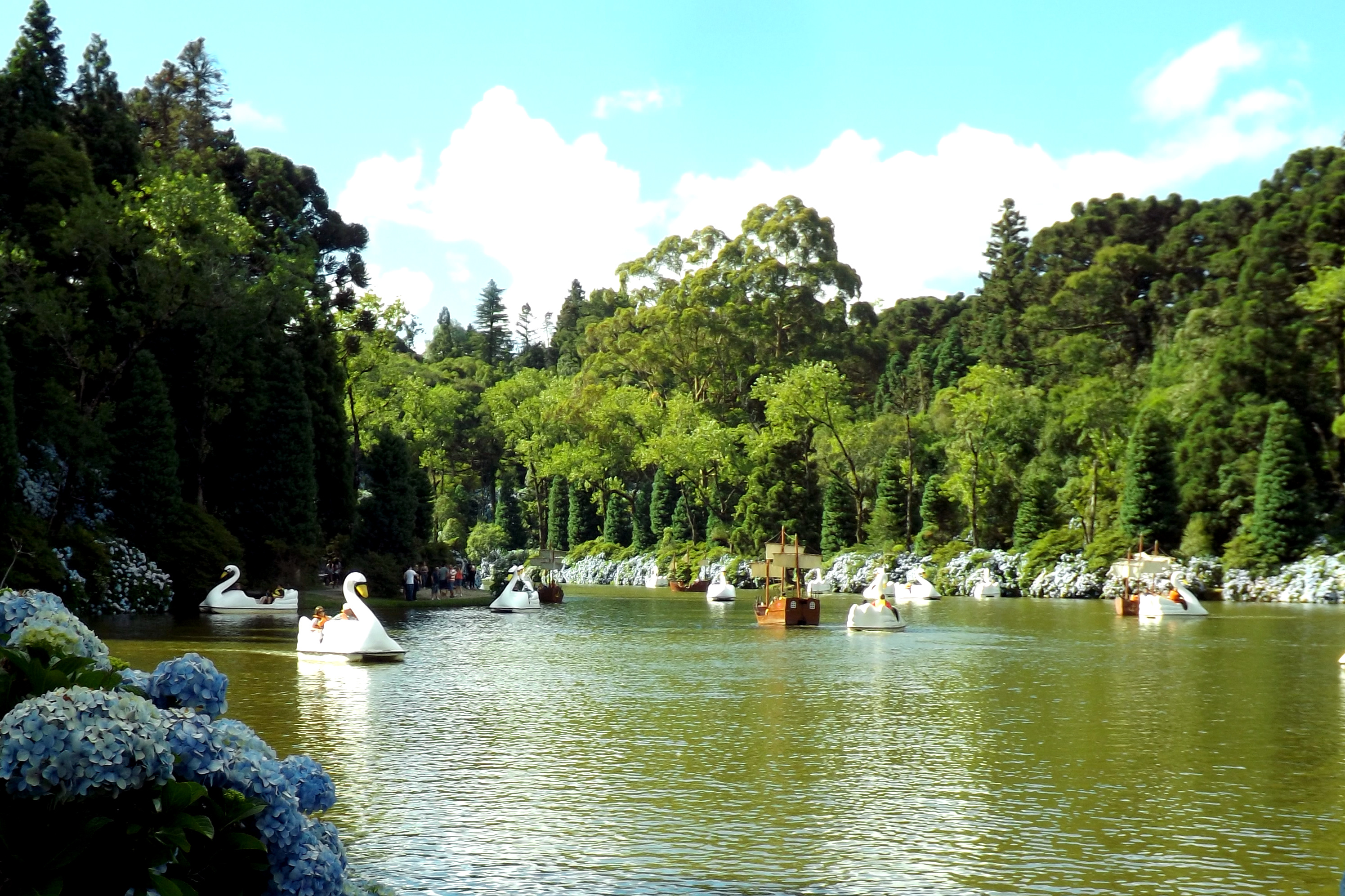
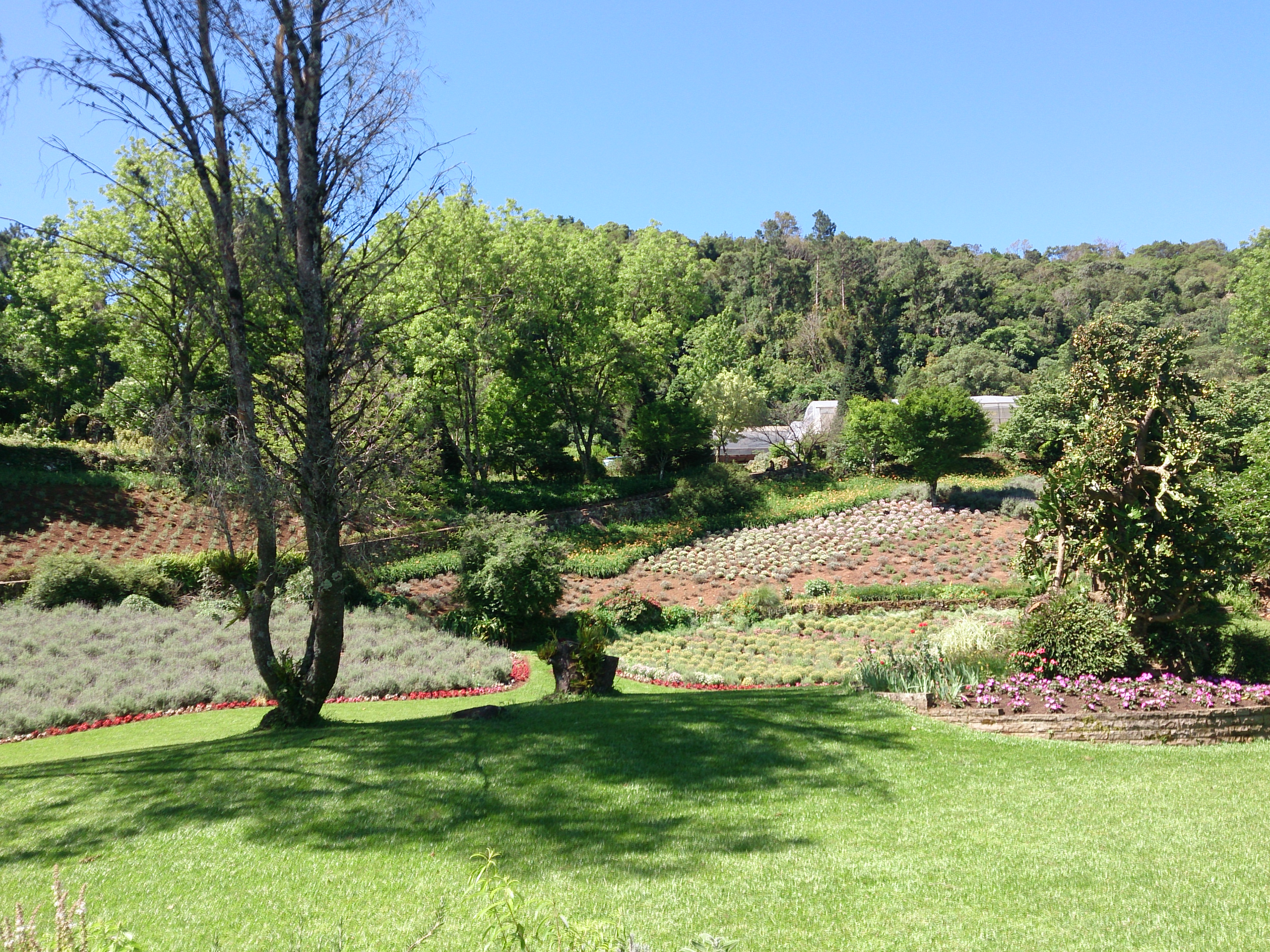
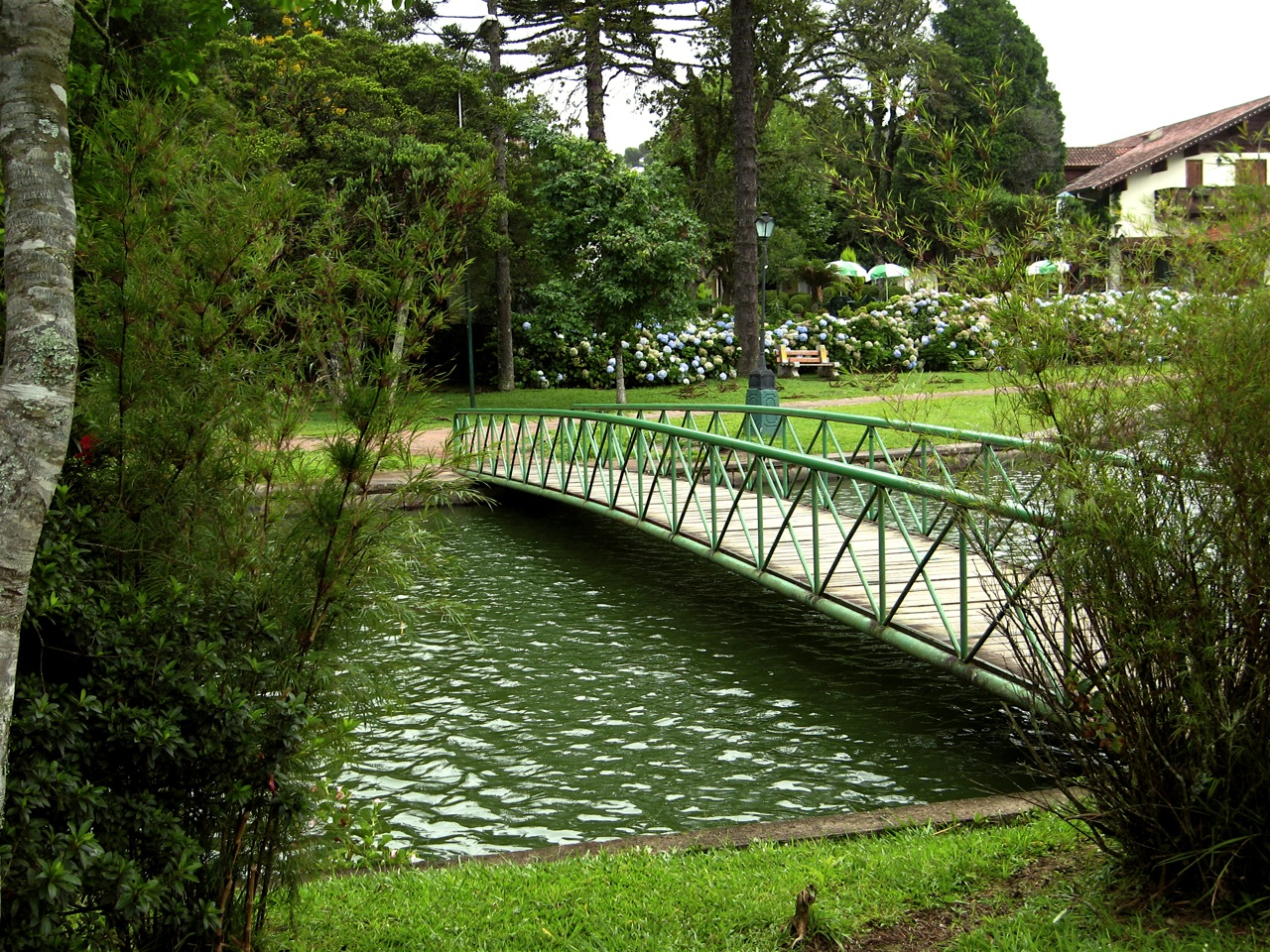
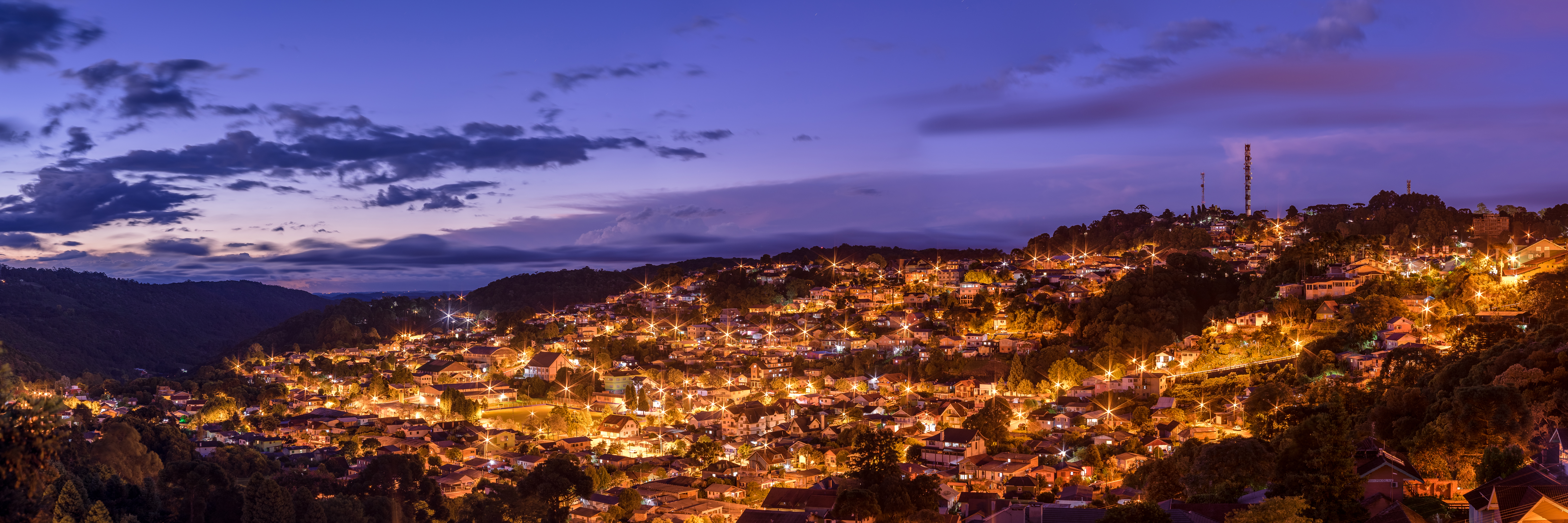

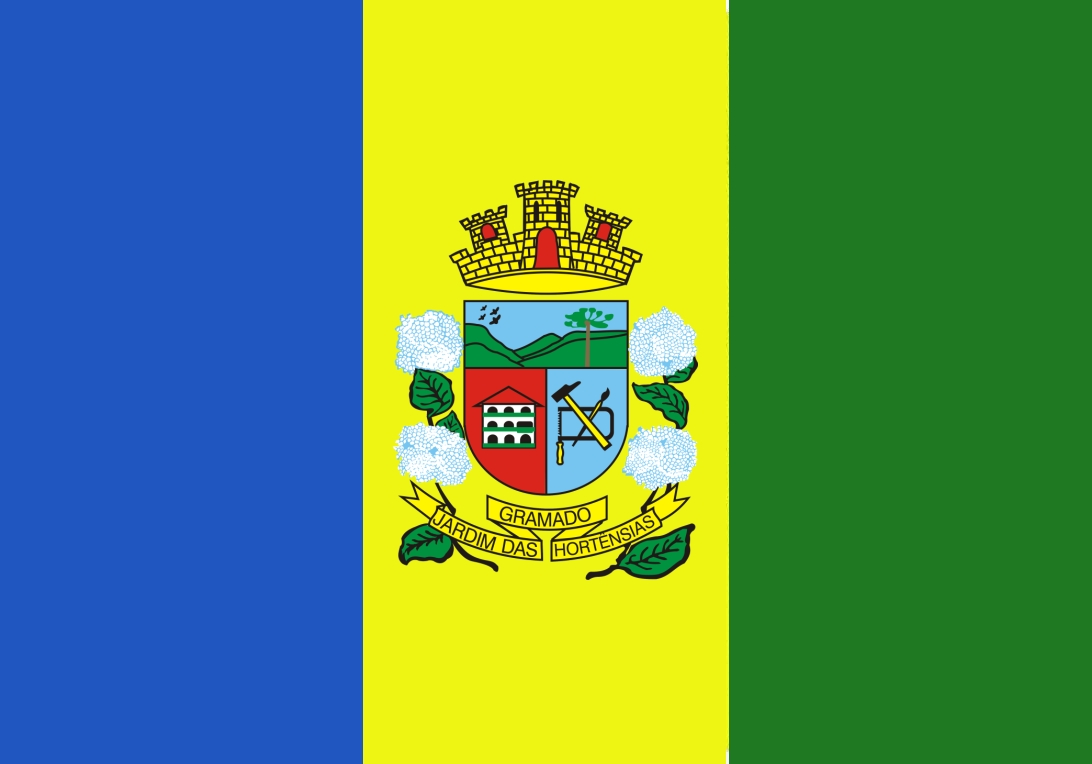
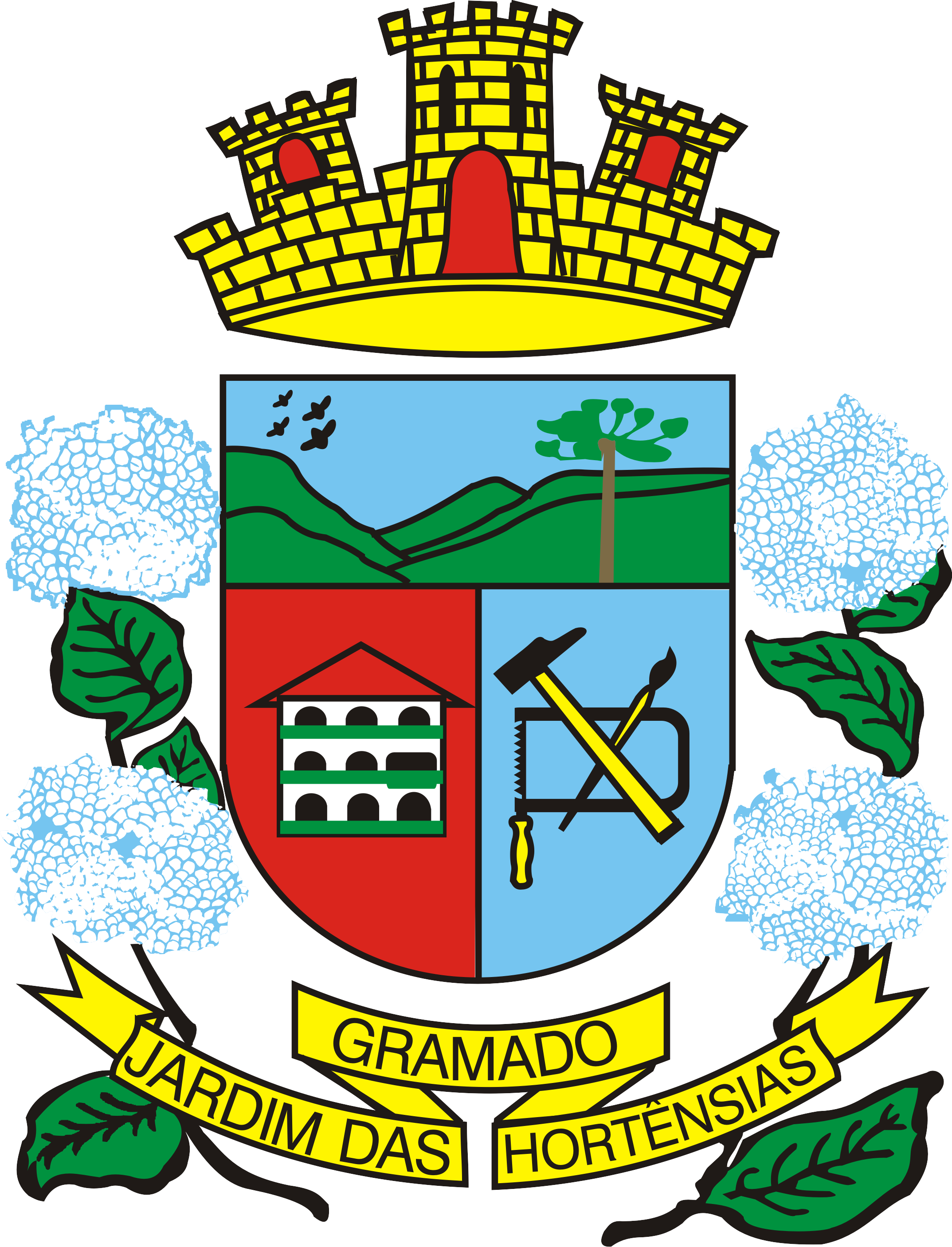
- Flag Coat of arms
- Nickname: Hydrangeas' Garden
- Location in Rio Grande do Sul
- Coordinates: 29°24′17″S 50°52′35″W
- Country: Brazil
- Region: South
- State: Rio Grande do Sul
- Founded: 15 December 1954

Government
  - Mayor: Nestor Tissot (PP)

Area
  - Total: 237 km^{2} (92 sq mi)
- Elevation: 850 m (2,790 ft)

Population (2022)
  - Total: 40,134
  - Density: 169/km^{2} (439/sq mi)
- Demonym: gramadense
- Time zone: UTC−3 (BRT)
- HDI (2026): 0.841 – very high
- Website: gramado.rs.gov.br

Gramado is a municipality in the state of Rio Grande do Sul, Brazil. It is located in the Serra Gaúcha region. The city was originally settled by Azorean descendants and later received a contingent of German and Italian immigrants. Gramado is one of the cities along the scenic route known as Rota Romântica.

== History ==
Gramado was originally settled in 1875 by Portuguese immigrants. Five years later, the first German immigrants arrived and these were followed shortly after by Italian immigrants from the Italian settlements in Caxias do Sul.

In 1913, the city seat was moved to Linha Nova, the location of the present-day city center. At this time, Gramado was an unincorporated city within the city of Taquara. A railway, brought by Gramado's founder and first administrator, José Nicoletti Filho, arrived in the city in 1921, boosting the local economy. Gramado officially became a city in 1937, when Gramado was already known as a summer holiday resort. Gramado became a city on 15 December 1954 by force of State Act 2,522.

On December 22, 2024, a Piper PA-42 crashed in a resort of the city. All 10 people on board died.

== Politics and government ==
Gramado Government is in a strong mayor-council government model, as set forth by the Brazilian Constitution of 1988. Elections for both mayoral and legislative offices are held every fourth year. The Mayor may seek reelection once, while Councilmen have no restriction on terms they may serve.

=== Executive branch ===
Executive powers are held by the mayor of Gramado, who appoints a Cabinet, the heads of several municipal bodies and members of the Planning Commission. The current mayor is Nestor Tissot (PP) elected in 2008. The current Deputy Mayor is Luia Barbacovi. In the election of 2016 the opposition candidate won, thereby Fedoca Bertolucci takes the City Hall on 1 January 2017.

== Geography ==
=== Open spaces ===
Gramado has several green areas. Among the most important are Black Lake, Communications Square, Knorr Park, Orchard Park, Major Nicoletti Square and Roses Square.

=== Lago Negro ===
Lago Negro (Black Lake) is the most known, visited green area of Gramado. It was created in 1953 by Leopoldo Rosenfeld on an area containing a large concentration of hydrangeas, hence the name the Hydrangeas' Region. It was named Black Lake because Rosenfeld imported the trees surrounding the lake from Germany's Black Forest. This area had been destroyed by fire in 1942.

A creek was dammed up to create a U-shaped lake. Rosenfeld imported pine seedlings from the Black Forest in Germany to be planted all around the newly formed lake's rim.

Lago Negro is a 1.6 kilometers away from the Town Hall. There is a boathouse, working daily from 08:30 to 19:00, where you can rent swan boats to tour the lake, concession stands, public restrooms, and a small craftsmen fair nearby.

The city is in a mountain range, averaging 850 meters above sea level. Visitors from the Northern Hemisphere mid-latitudes may notice several tree species (including red maple, American sweetgum and American Tuliptree) common to their home territory in cultivation here, flourishing among the native Parana Pine. Hydrangeas blossom in late spring.

=== Climate ===
Gramado has a temperate oceanic climate (Cfb, according to the Köppen climate classification). The summers are not usually hot, with temperatures around 22 °C (72 °F). There are some hotter days, but with always pleasant evenings, moderated by mountain air and forests. Winters are cool, with temperatures sometimes falling below 0 °C (32 °F), heavy frosts and occasional snowfall.

Climate data for Gramado
Month	Jan	Feb	Mar	Apr	May	Jun	Jul	Aug	Sep	Oct	Nov	Dec	Year
Mean daily maximum °C (°F)	25.6 (78.1)	24.8 (76.6)	22.9 (73.2)	19.9 (67.8)	17.6 (63.7)	16.7 (62.1)	16.9 (62.4)	18.1 (64.6)	19.3 (66.7)	21.4 (70.5)	23.4 (74.1)	23.2 (73.8)	20.8 (69.5)
Daily mean °C (°F)	20.7 (69.3)	20.1 (68.2)	18.2 (64.8)	15.4 (59.7)	13.1 (55.6)	12.2 (54.0)	12.2 (54.0)	13.2 (55.8)	14.4 (57.9)	16.4 (61.5)	18.2 (64.8)	18.1 (64.6)	16.0 (60.9)
Mean daily minimum °C (°F)	15.8 (60.4)	15.4 (59.7)	13.6 (56.5)	10.9 (51.6)	8.7 (47.7)	7.7 (45.9)	7.5 (45.5)	8.4 (47.1)	9.6 (49.3)	11.4 (52.5)	13.0 (55.4)	13.1 (55.6)	11.3 (52.3)
Average rainfall mm (inches)	168 (6.6)	168 (6.6)	184 (7.2)	152 (6.0)	143 (5.6)	175 (6.9)	163 (6.4)	170 (6.7)	197 (7.8)	177 (7.0)	136 (5.4)	163 (6.4)	1,996 (78.6)

== Culture and tourism ==
- Festival de Gramado, a major South American film festival and Gramado's most important event;
- Natal Luz, Christmas festival, the largest in Brazil.
- Festa da Colônia, event that celebrates the immigration history of the region.

Gramado is served by Canela Airport, located in the municipality of Canela, 8 km away.

== Twin towns – sister cities ==
Gramado is twinned with:

- Angra do Heroísmo, Portugal
- Levico Terme, Italy
- Maldonado, Uruguay
- Óbidos, Portugal
- Bariloche, Argentina
- Puerto Varas, Chile

== See also ==
- List of municipalities in Rio Grande do Sul
- Snow in Brazil

== Gallery ==
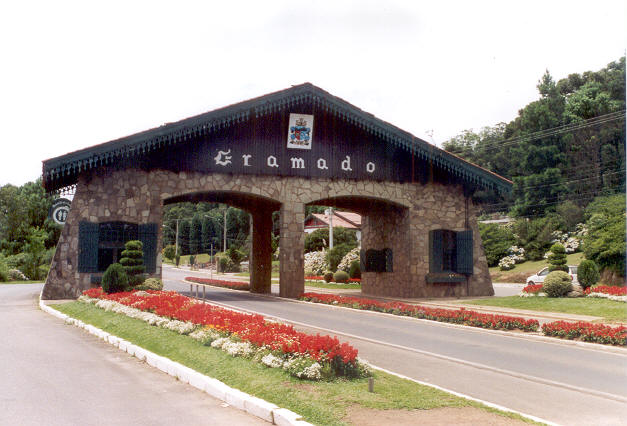
City entrance portico

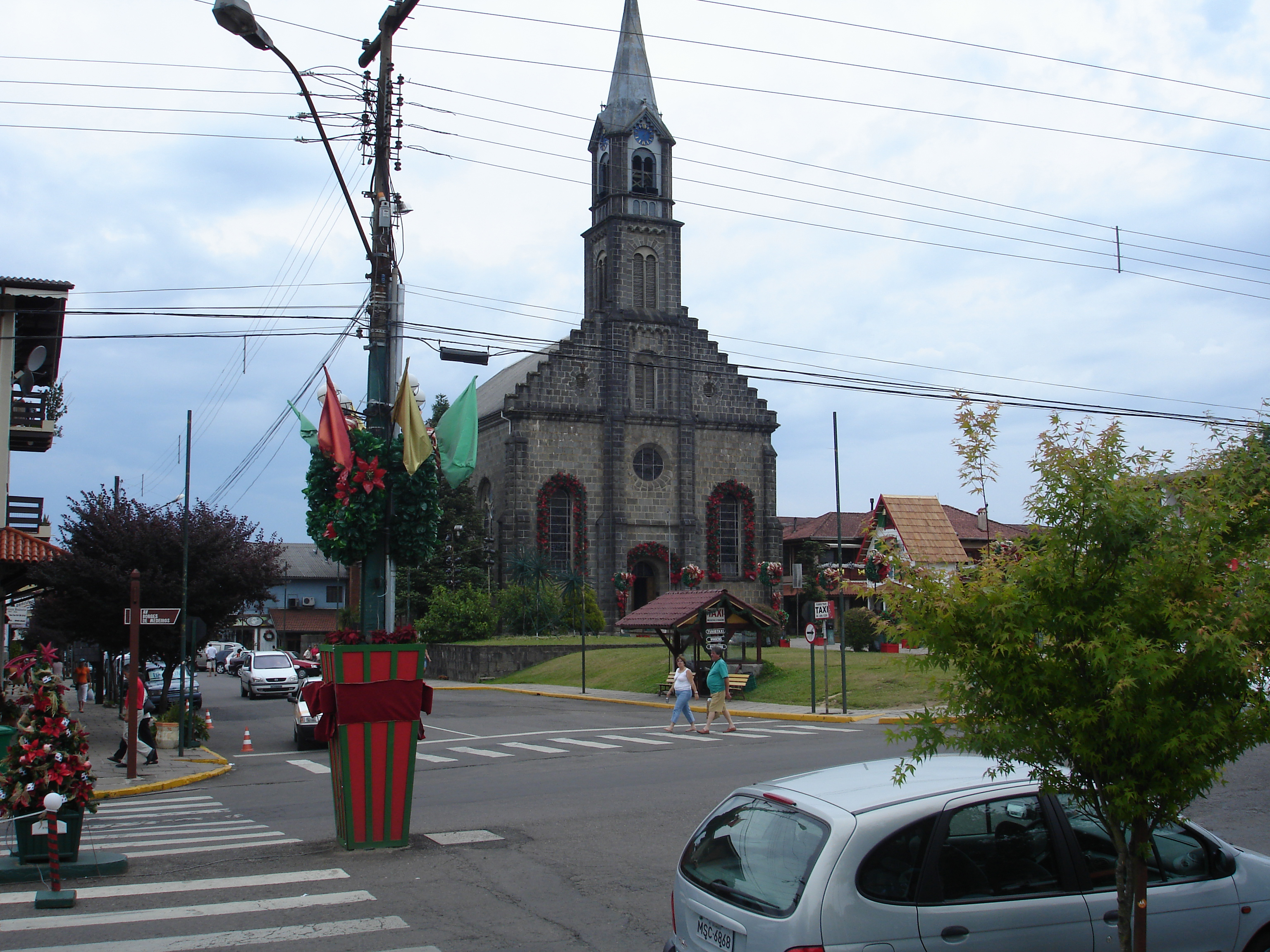
Igreja Matriz São Pedro, or "St.Peter's Church", the most famous in the city

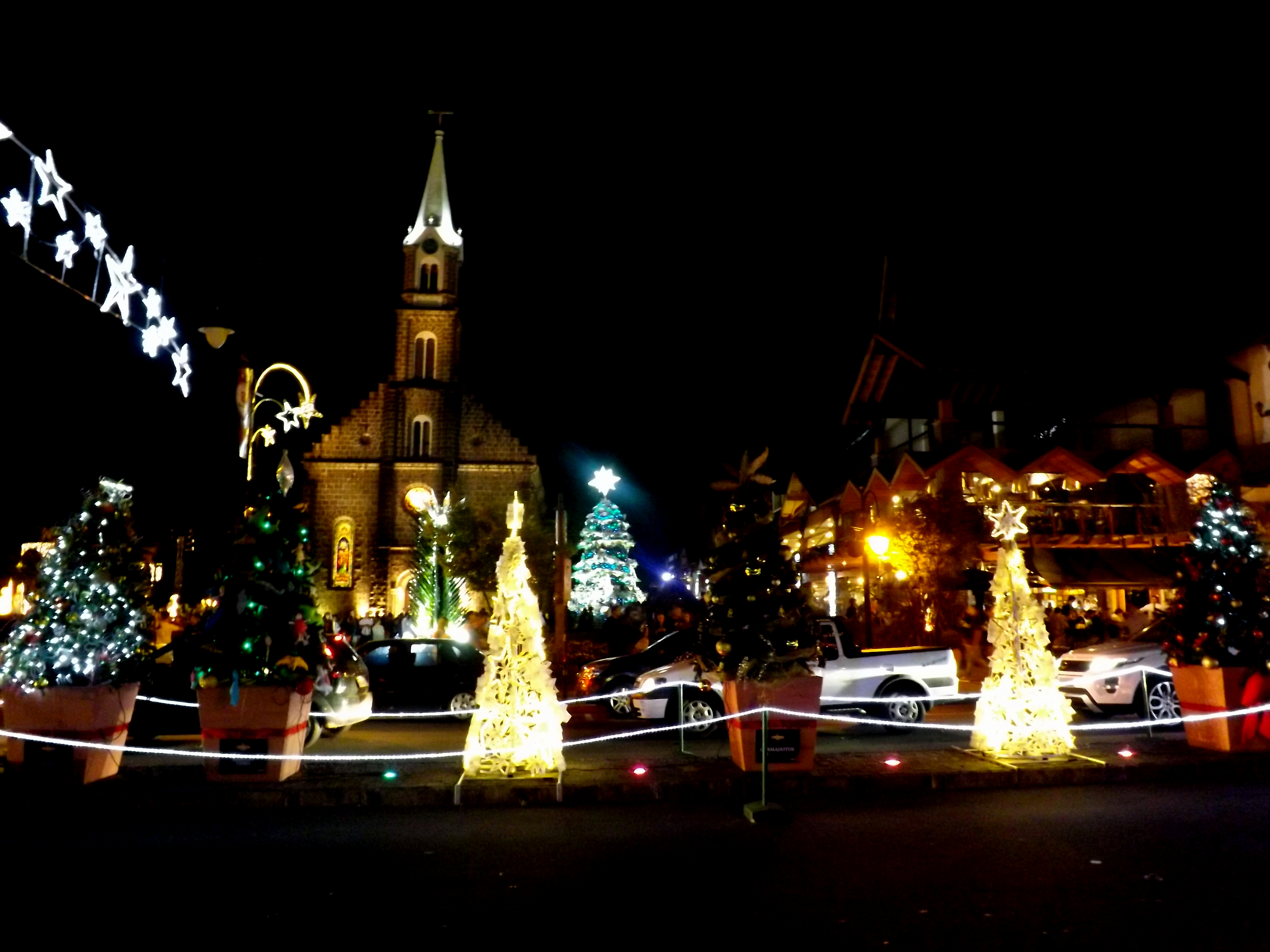
Natal Luz (Christmas of Lights)

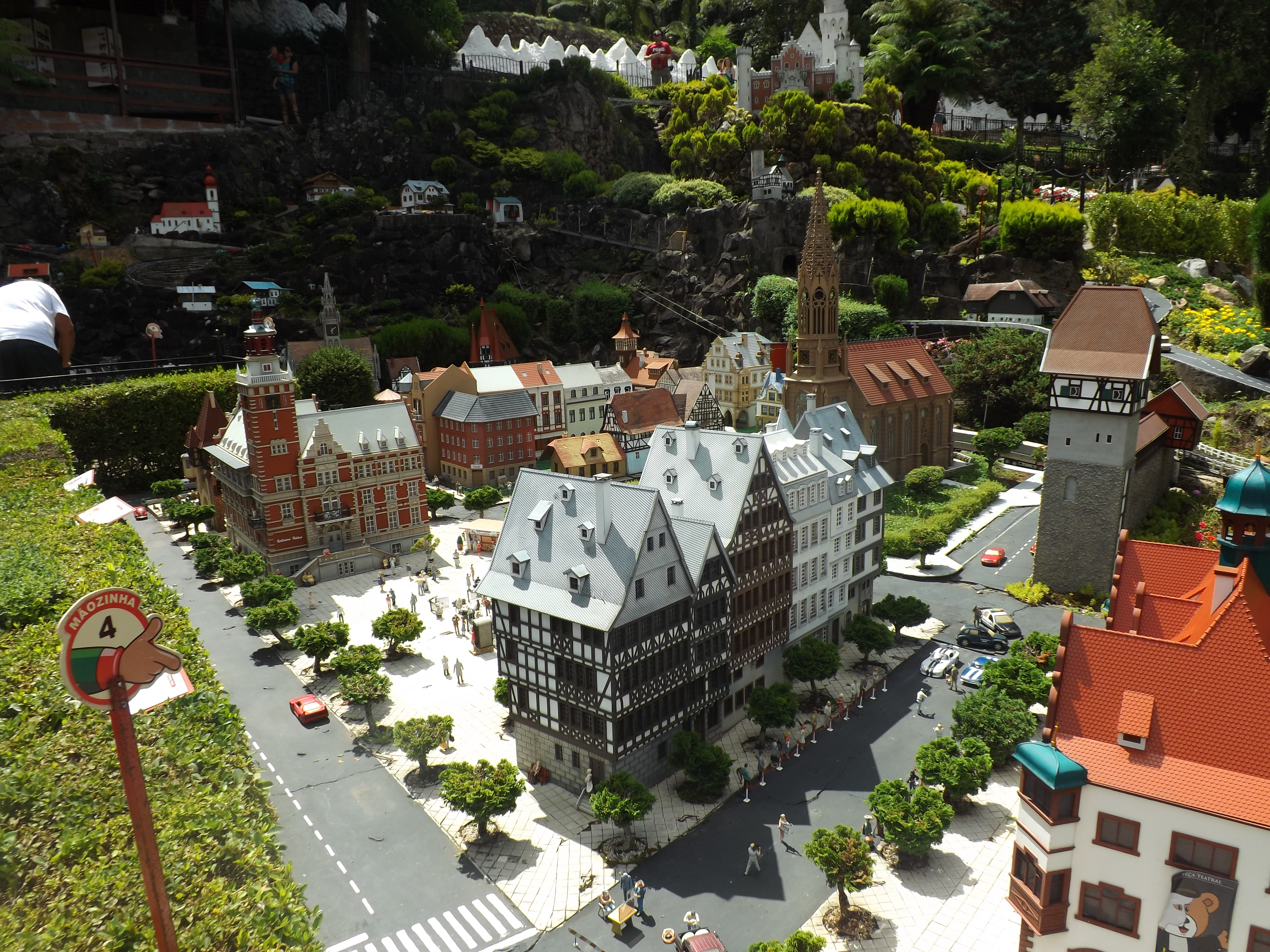
"Mini-Mundo" (Mini-World)

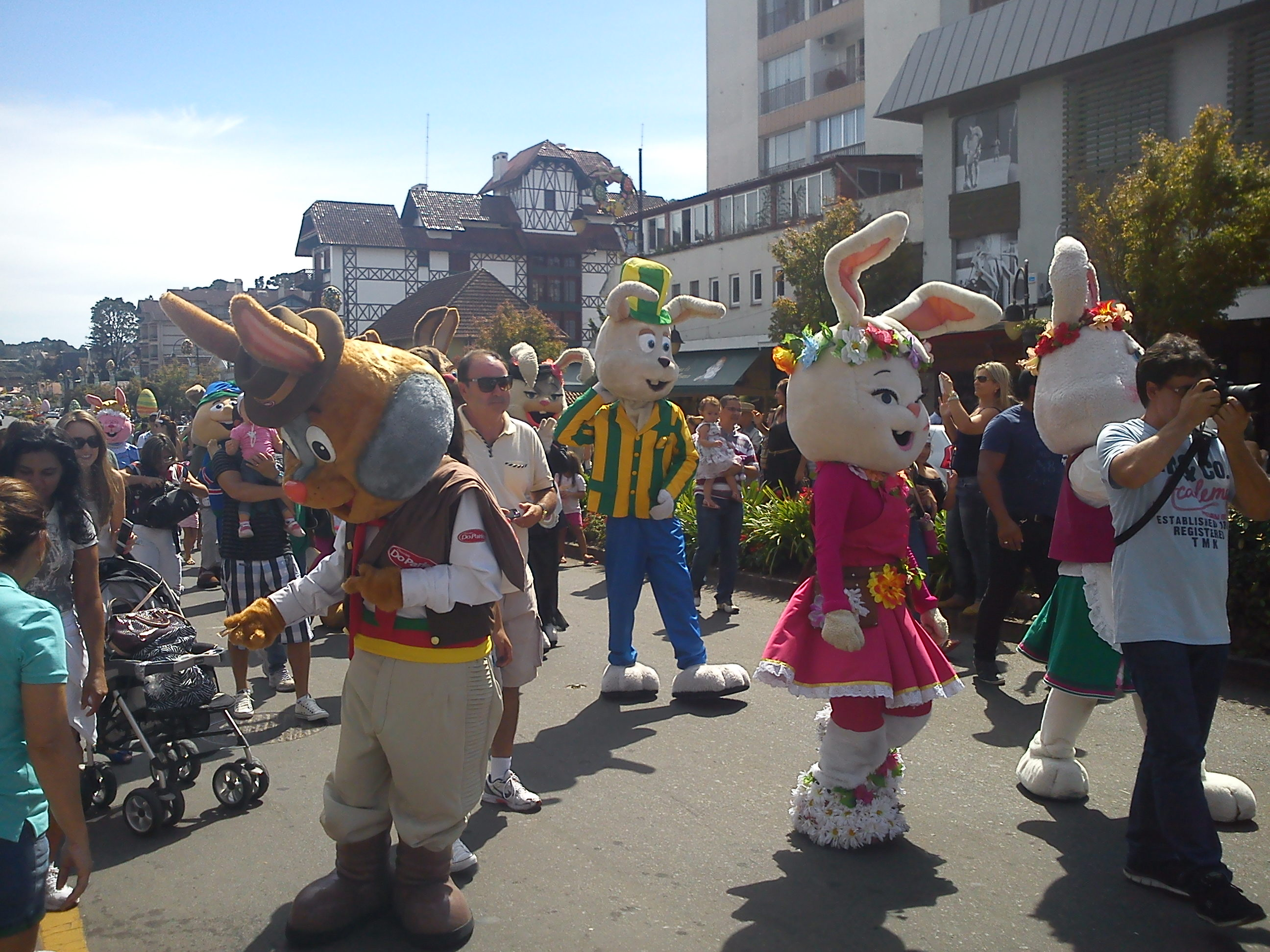
Choco-fest

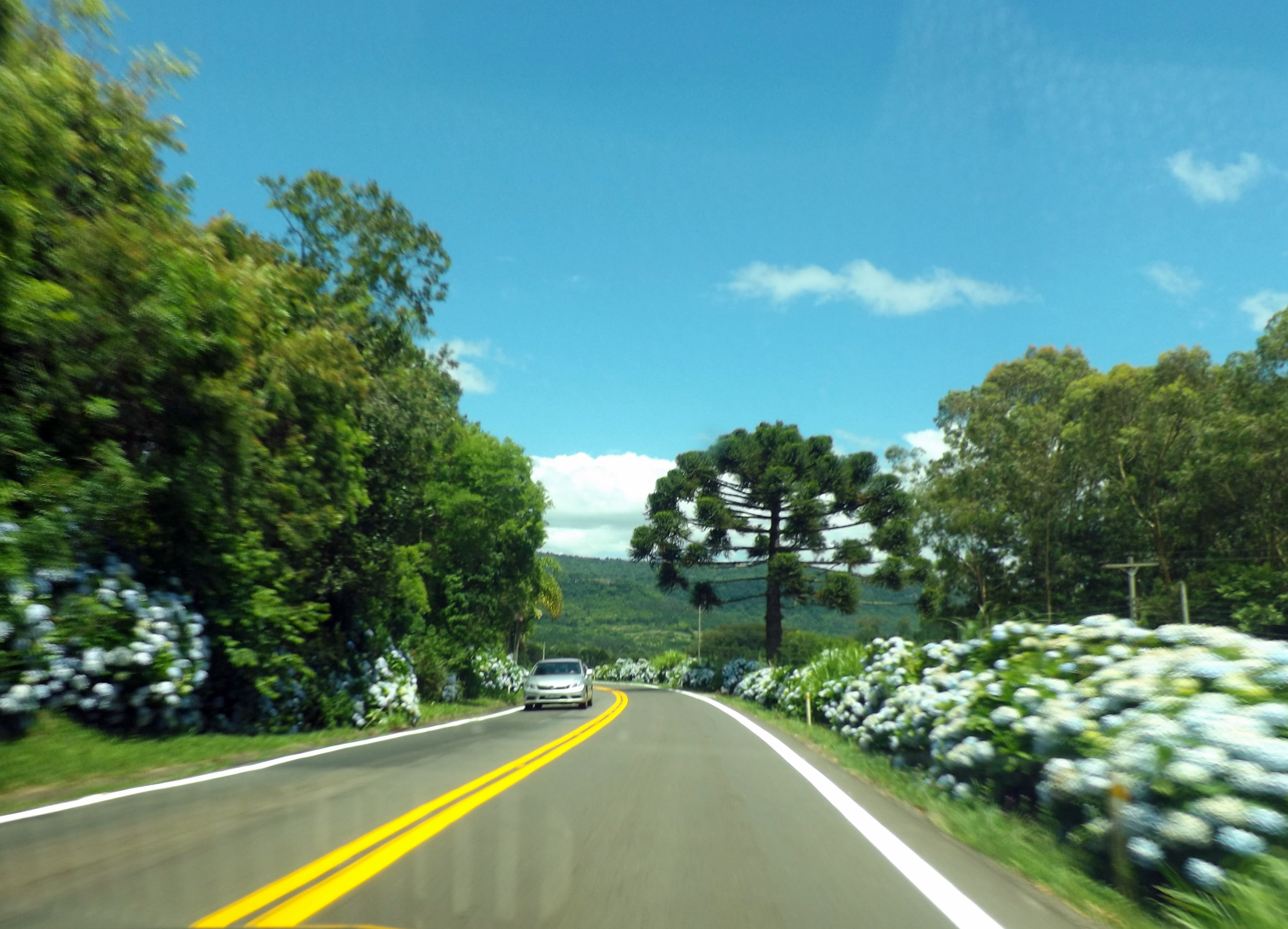
Hydrangeas adorn the roads around the city

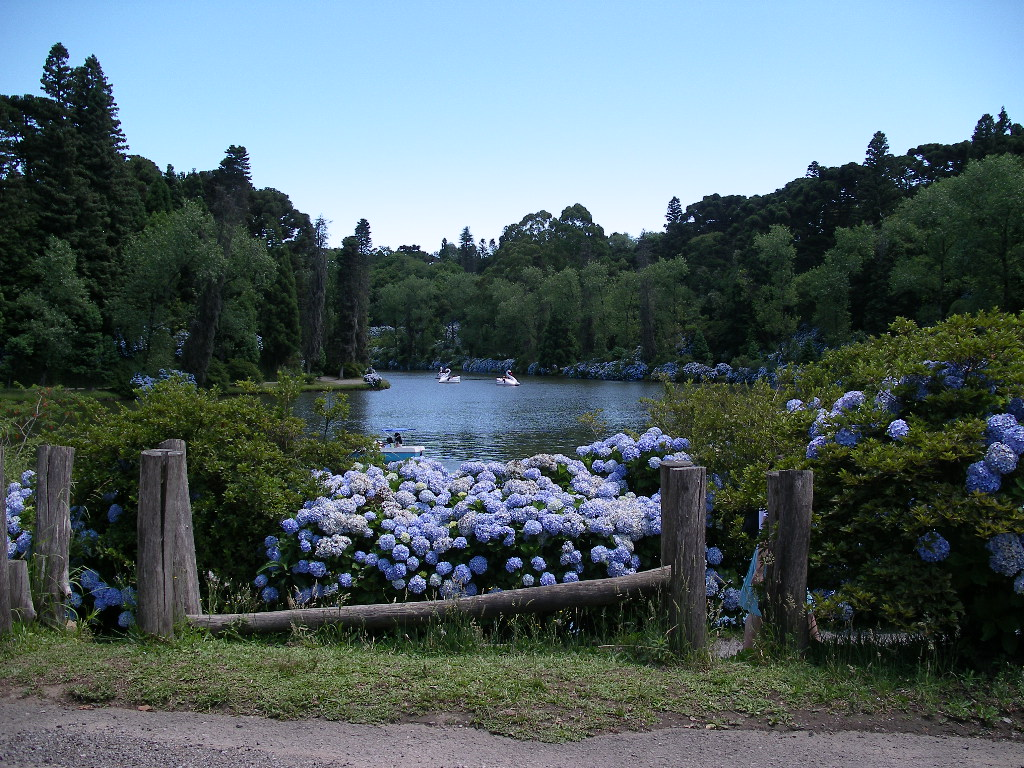
Hydrangeas along the Lago Negro (Back Lake)

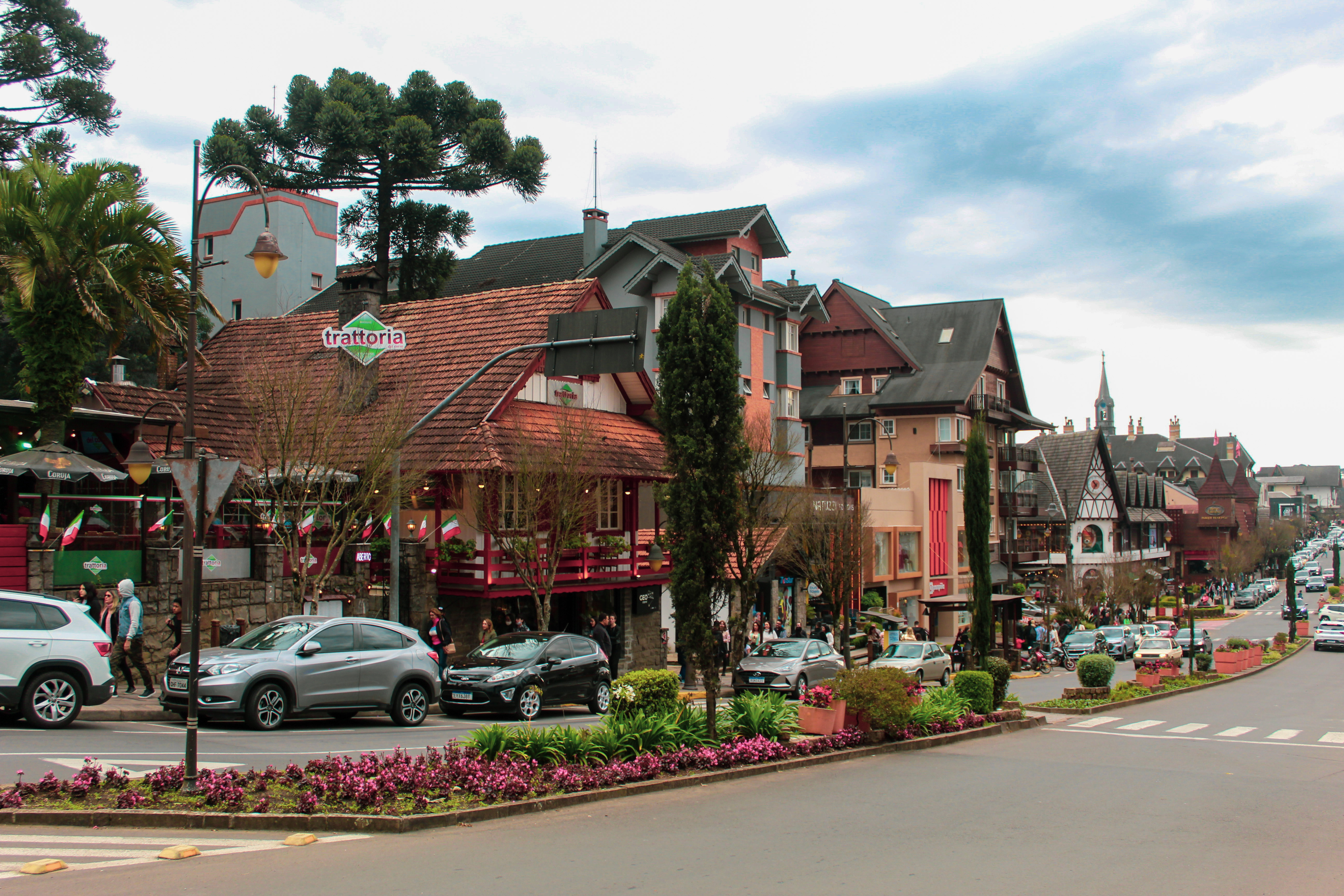
Italian cuisine, in addition to that from other countries, all of a high standard, is one of the city's attractions

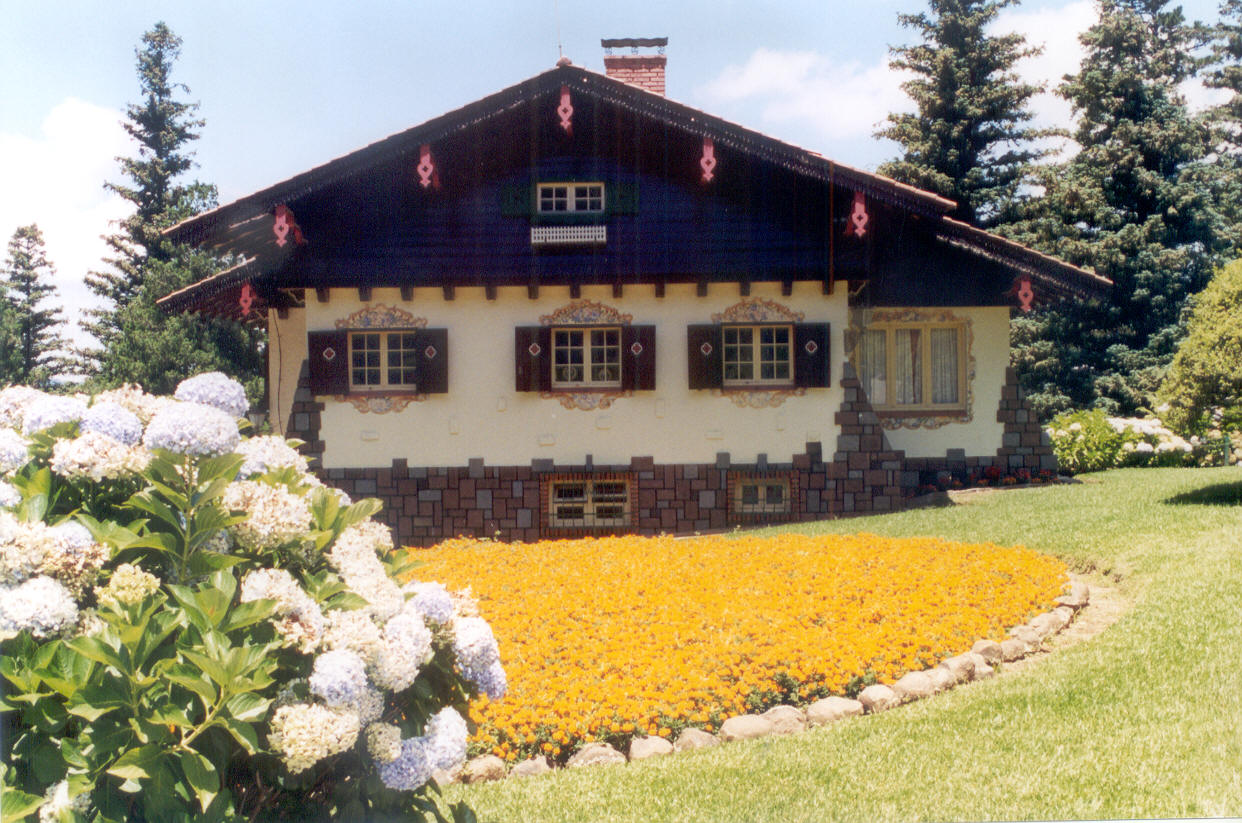
German architecture is a requirement for building properties in the city

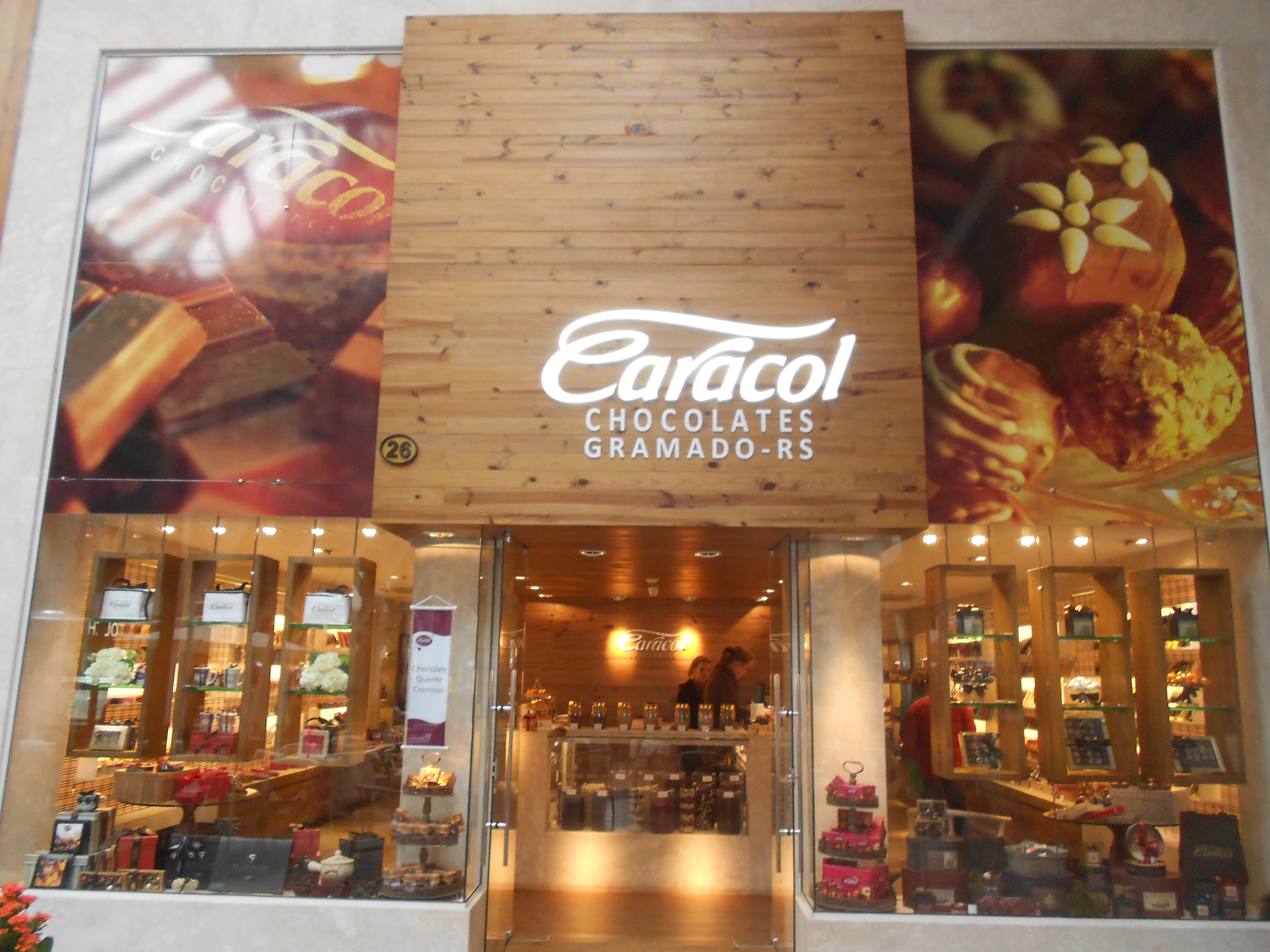
Dozens of artisanal chocolate shops spread across the city are a striking feature

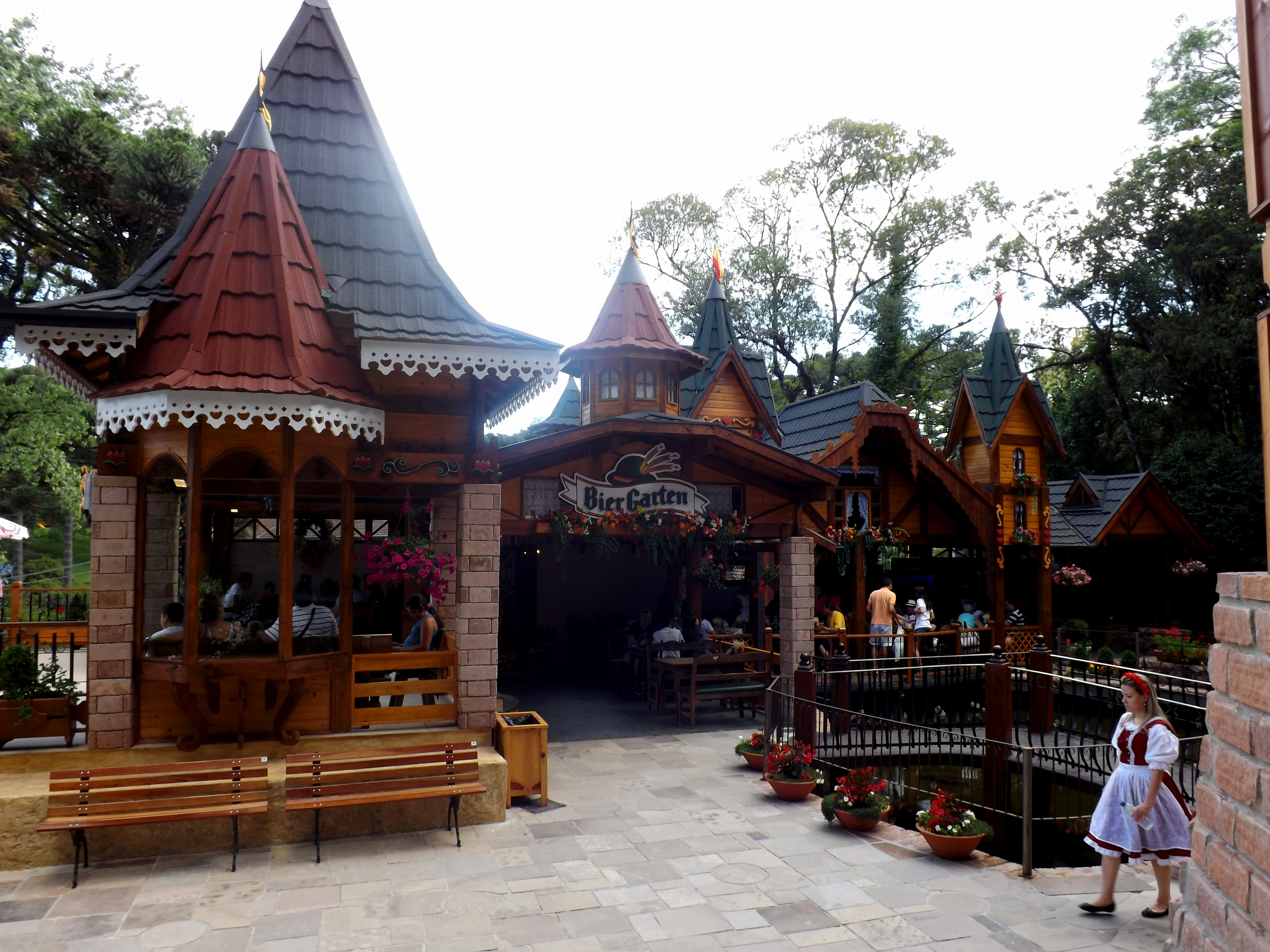
Theme park reminiscent of Germany and Oktoberfest
