= Mayor of Gramado, Rio Grande do Sul =

The Mayor of Gramado is the Head of Government of the town. The mayor is elected for a four-year term, allowed to seek re-election only once. The current mayor is Nestor Tissot.

Gramado has a weak mayor-council form of government and, all executive powers are vested in the person of the mayor. Gramado Town Charter sets these responsibilities (Chapter III, Section II, Article 60), among others, for the mayor of Gramado:

- Being the legal representatives in all lawsuits whenever Gramado is either plaintiff or defendant
- Appointment and firing of Cabinet members, their deputies, and every person appointed to a body connected to Town Hall
- Sponsoring bills as set forth by Town Charter
- Sign into law bills approved by Town Council
- Veto bills, either totally or partially
- Setting up bureaucracy
- Issuance of condemnation ordinances
- Drafting of appropriation bills

== List of mayors since Emancipation ==
#	Mayor	Term	Party
78	Walter Bertoluci	1955–1959	
79	Arno Michaelsen	1960–1963	
80	José Francisco Perini	1963–1969	
81	Horst Volk	1969–1973	ARENA
82	Waldemar Weber	1973–1977	ARENA
83	Nelson Dinnebier	1977–1983	PMDB
84	Pedro Bertolucci	1983–1988	PP
85	Nelson Dinnebier	1989–1992	PMDB
86	Pedro Bertolucci	1993–1996	PP
87	Nelson Dinnebier	1997–2000	PMDB
88	Pedro Bertolucci	2001–2004	PP
89	Pedro Bertolucci	2005–2008	PP
90	Nestor Tissot	2009 – Current	PP

== Notes ==
- Casagrande, Gilnei. "Avenida Borges de Medeiros." gramadosite.com. 31 January 2006. 15 September 2006 .
- Gramado Town Charter.
