= Canela Airport =

Airport in Brazil

Canela Airport Aeroporto de Canela
- IATA: CEL; ICAO: SSCN; LID: RS0019

Summary
- Airport type: Public
- Operator: Infraero (2024–present)
- Serves: Canela, Gramado
- Time zone: BRT (UTC−03:00)
- Elevation AMSL: 827 m (2,713 ft)
- Coordinates: 29°22′14″S 050°49′56″W
- Website: www4.infraero.gov.br/aeroporto-de-canela/

Map
- Location in Brazil CEL (Brazil)

Runways
| Direction | Length | | Surface |
| Direction | m | ft | Surface |
|---|---|---|---|
| 06/24 | 1,260 | 4,134 | Asphalt |

Statistics (2025)
- Passengers: 2,897
- Aircraft Operations: 2,611
- Metric tonnes of cargo: 0
- Statistics: Infraero; Sources: Airport Website, ANAC, DECEA

Canela Airport (IATA: CEL, ICAO: SSCN) is the airport serving Canela and Gramado in the Brazilian state of Rio Grande do Sul.

It is operated by Infraero.

== History ==
On 14 July 2024, the State of Rio Grande do Sul signed a contract of operation with Infraero.

== Accidents and incidents ==
- 22 December 2024: a Piper PA-42 Cheyenne registration PR-NDN, operating a private flight, crashed after take-off under heavy rain, killing all 10 persons on board and injuring 17 people on the ground.

== Access ==
The airport is located 3 km (2 mi) from downtown Canela and 8 km (5 mi) from downtown Gramado.

== See also ==
- List of airports in Brazil
