= Nicoletti (politician) =

Brazilian politician (born 1981)

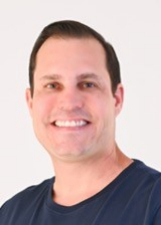
- Nicoletti in 2024

Member of the Chamber of Deputies
- Incumbent
- Assumed office 1 February 2019
- Constituency: Roraima

Personal details
- Born: 27 July 1981 (age 45)
- Party: Brazil Union (since 2022)

Antonio Carlos Nicoletti (born 27 July 1981), known mononymously as Nicoletti, is a Brazilian politician serving as a member of the Chamber of Deputies since 2019. In the 2020 municipal elections, he was a candidate for mayor of Boa Vista.
