= Nicoletti Lake =

Lake in Sicily, Italy

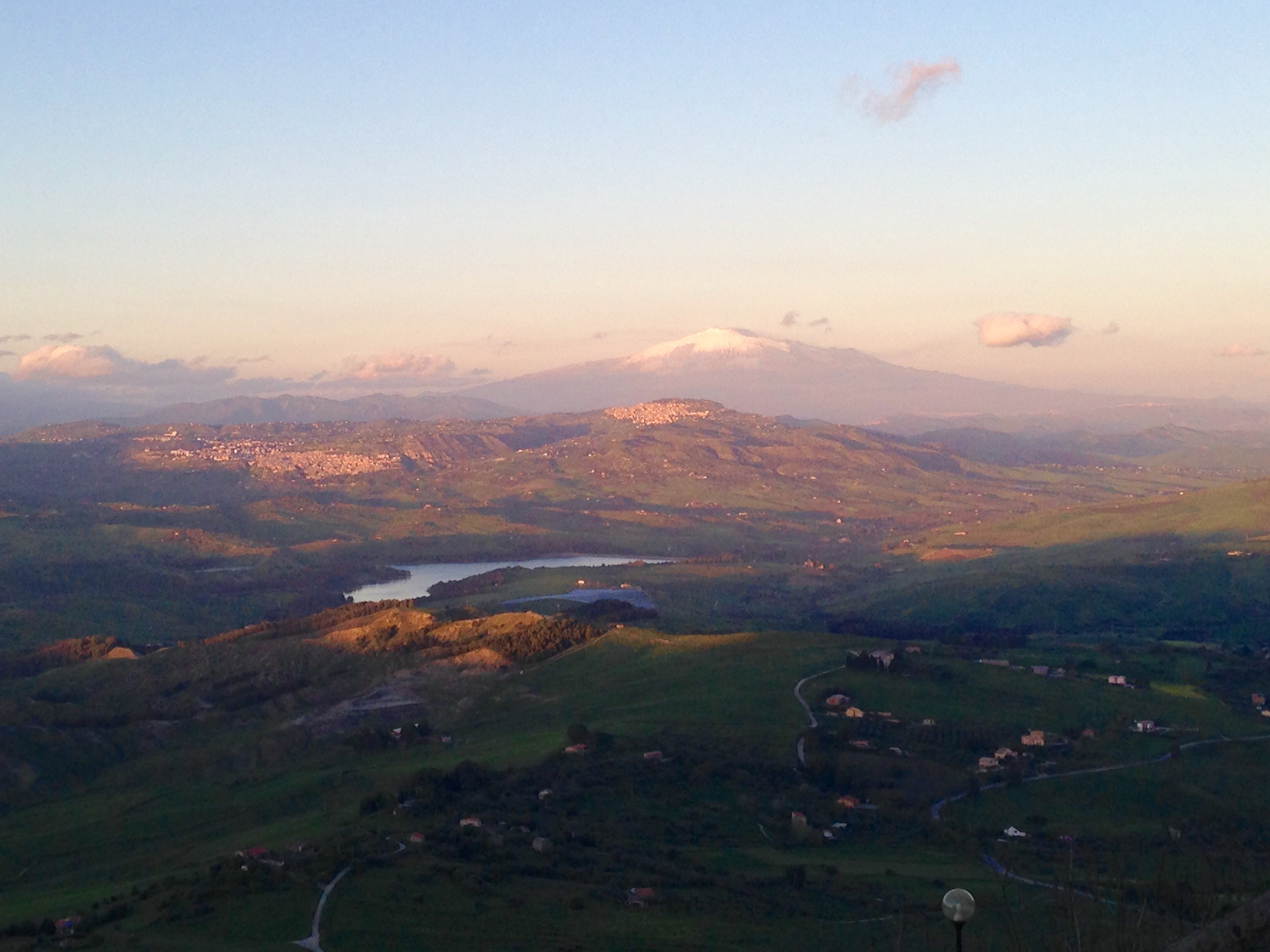
- View of Etna, lago Nicoletti, Leonforte and Assoro

- Location within Sicily
- Location: Province of Enna, Sicily
- Coordinates: 37.61°N 14.34°E
- Primary inflows: Dittaino
- Primary outflows: Dittaino
- Catchment area: 62 km^{2} (24 sq mi)
- Basin countries: Italy
- Surface area: 1.8 km^{2} (0.69 sq mi)
- Average depth: 12.9 m (42 ft)
- Max. depth: 38.8 m (127 ft)
- Water volume: 23,200,000 m^{3} (820,000,000 cu ft)
- Residence time: 3.9 years
- Surface elevation: 388 m (1,273 ft)

Nicoletti Lake is a lake in the Province of Enna, Sicily, Italy. It was constructed in the early 1970s by damming the Dittaino river. At an elevation of 388 m, its surface area is 1.8 km² and it has an average depth of 12.9 m.
