= Rudy Nicoletti =

Italian electronic music producer

- Origin: Milan, Italy
- Genres: Techno; House; dance; electronic
- Years active: 2004–present
- Labels: F.M.A.; Global Underground; Inner Records; Universal Music Group; Out of System Records
- Members: Rudy Nicoletti
- Website: rudynicoletti.com

Rudy Nicoletti (born 1976), electronic music and record producer, is known for being behind many dance records and electronic music projects all over Europe. 2013 on, he began to release music under his own name and founded Out of System Records, a recording label based in New York, London and Rome, specialized in electronic music.

Before producing as a solo artist, he worked for a very long time with the late Graziano Pegoraro, producer of Tracy Spencer's 'Run To Me', T42's 'Run To You', Miko Mission, Mato Grosso, Ava & Stone, releasing tracks on dance compilations such as MP3 Compilation, PlayDJ and DJ Voice, through Emi, Warner, F.M.A., Nocolors, Krone Records, Global Underground, Crisler, Inner and Netswork.

In 2008, Rudy's single ‘Hot Looking Babes’ aka CP & Co, was chosen by Global Underground for the ‘Ibiza Afterhours Vol.2’ compilation and Paul Van Dyk opened his Vonyc Sessions with it at the WMC in Miami.

Another single, 'To Da House', was the 13th most charted electro house track on Junodownload in 2011 and tracks like 'Du Auch' and 'Set It Free' (aka Earthquake) reached No. 1 (Trismix vol 12) in Rimini Disco Più Minimal House Sales Chart.

During Summer 2012, Rudy got featured in ‘MEId in Italy: Speciale Estate’ Compilation edited by MEI ('Meeting Degli Indipendenti') featuring independent music in Italy.

2013, nl:Nathalie Aarts, from dance act it:The Soundlovers, and it:Kim Lukas stood on top of the Italian Dance Network chart with ‘Sad Girl (Rudy Nicoletti Remix) for over two months.

2014 sees four new singles via Out of System Records, distributed by AWAL, a division of Kobalt Label Group, preceding the release of the instrumental dance album "Filler". In 2015, two more albums are released, 'Impressive' and 'Expressive', along with 'Dark Techno' Compilation (Vol.1 and 2) and 'DJ Set Series: Rudy Nicoletti Techno'.

== Partial discography ==
- E-ternal "Let The Rhythm" (2005)
- Joshua 3 "Girl" (2005)
- French Kiss "Tu M’Aime Toujours" (2006)
- Cp & Co "Hot Looking Babes"" (2007)
- Cp & Co "Superficial"" [#14 Sweden] (2007)
- Miko Mission "I’ve Been Thinking About You" (2008)
- Pyramide "Where Are You Flying ?"
- PK Plane "Of My Soul"
- Digital Talent "Microphone"
- T42 feat Sharp "Run to You" (Rudy Nicoletti 2010 rmx) (2010)
- Rudy Nicoletti "You like The Taste"
- Rudy Nicoletti "To Da House" [#13 Junodownload] (2011)
- Rudy Nicoletti "Du Auch" [#1 Italy] (2011)
- Bandhits "Did You See It ?"
- Lake Koast "Now Get To Sleep"
- Earthquake "Set It Free" [#1 Italy] (2011)
- Lovecraft "Always Wonder Why"
- Rudy Nicoletti "Apart"
- Nathalie Aarts & Kim Lucas "Sad Girl" (Rudy Nicoletti rmx) Italy (2013)
