= José Nicoletti Filho =

Italian-Brazilian revolutionary (1871–1937)

Major José Nicoletti Filho
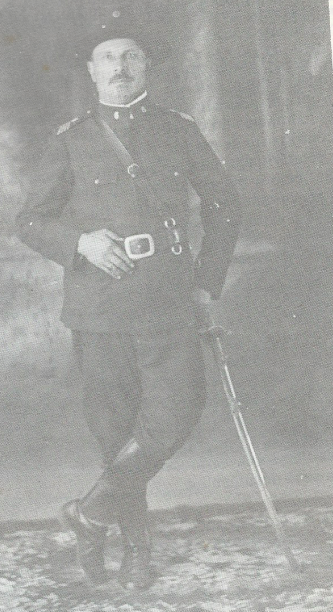

Police Chief
- Leader: 5th District of Taquara (Gramado)

Personal details
- Born: Giuseppe Luigi Nicoletti; 24 February 1871 Veneto
- Died: 5 February 1937 (aged 65)
- Spouse: Amélia Huff
- Children: Anita, Diva Amélia, Célia, José Nicoletti Neto and Rui Nicoletti

Military service
- Branch/service: Brazilian Army
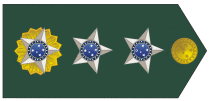
- Rank: Major
- Battles/wars: Federalist Revolution

José Nicoletti Filho (born Giuseppe Luigi Nicoletti; 24 February 1871 - 5 February 1937) was an Austrian-born Brazilian federalist public personality, revolutionary, sub-intendant, administrator and founder of the second most visited touristic city in Brazil, the city of Gramado. He immigrated from Tyrol to Brazil with his parents Giuseppe Nicoletti and Theresa Costa Nicoletti. He participated on the Federalist Revolution and earned the rank of Major.

== Career and social contributions ==
In 1904, the President of the state of Rio Grande do Sul, Borges de Medeiros, invited Nicoletti - as a major and as police chief of the city of Taquara - to assume the headship of the 5th district of Taquara and to organize it, politically and administratively. Nicoletti abandoned all his private properties (valued at $500.000.000 at the time) for, as he said, "the wellness of the collectivity".

The city was founded in September 1912, but only registered on 17 January 1913, under Act number 139. Letters written by Nicoletti to Sr. Borges de Medeiros confirm this.

== Legacy ==
The house where Gramado's first administrator lived has been registered as a cultural patrimony, and it's currently being restored due to the posterior installation of the most important social-cultural and historic source of the city. The Major Nicoletti Museum will not only contain the Nicoletti's family story, but also the story of the families who contributed to this honourable man building the city that Gramado represents today, nationally and internationally.
