= Torres, Rio Grande do Sul =

Municipality of Rio Grande do Sul, Brazil

Torres
- City
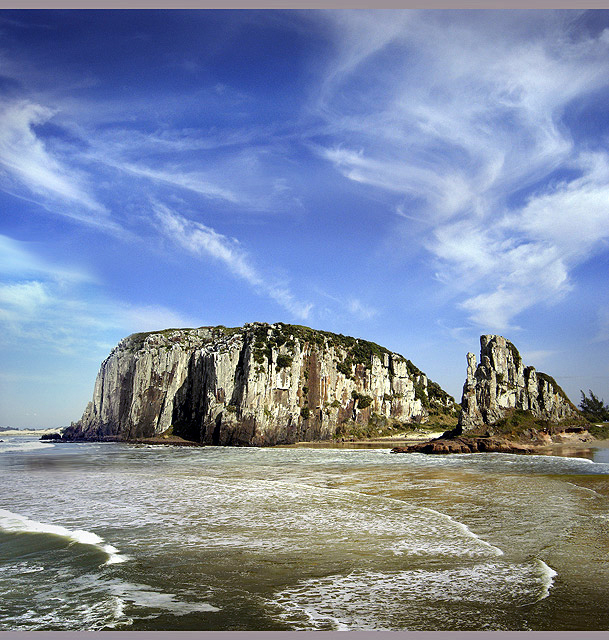
- The "towers" of Praia da Guarita, one of the city's most distinctive landmarks

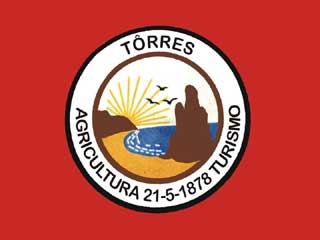
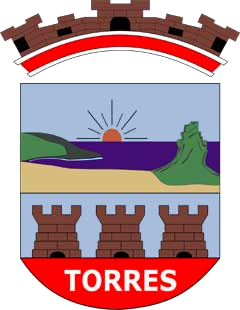
- Flag Coat of arms
- Nickname: Torrense
- Motto: Work and live with great pleasure
- Coordinates: 29°20′31″S 49°43′47″W
- Country: Brazil
- Region: South
- State: Rio Grande do Sul
- Metropolitan region: Urban agglomeration of the North Coast
- Neighboring municipalities: Arroio do Sal, Mampituba, Dom Pedro de Alcântara, Morrinhos do Sul, and Passo de Torres
- Distance to capital: 208 km
- Founded: May 21, 1878

Government
  - Mayor: Delci Dimer (MDB)

Area
  - Total: 161.624 km^{2} (62.403 sq mi)
- Elevation: 16 m (52 ft)

Population (2022)
  - Total: 41,751
  - Rank: RS: 53rd BR: 878th
  - Density: 258.32/km^{2} (669.05/sq mi)
- Time zone: UTC−3 (BRT)
- Climate: Humid subtropical
- HDI (2010): 0.762
- GDP (2020): R$1,242,675.67
- GDP per capita (2020): R$31,811.28
- Website: torres.rs.gov.br

Torres is a Brazilian municipality located at the northernmost point of the Atlantic coast in the state of Rio Grande do Sul. The city's landscape is distinguished as the only beach in Rio Grande do Sul featuring prominent rocky cliffs along the shoreline, and it is home to the state's sole maritime island, Ilha dos Lobos.

The area now occupied by the city has been inhabited by humans for thousands of years, with physical evidence in the form of middens and other archaeological findings. In the 17th century, during the Portuguese colonization of Brazil, the region's location within a narrowing of the southern coastal plain made it a mandatory passage for tropeiros and other Portuguese-Brazilian explorers and adventurers traveling south along the coast—the only alternative route was over the Vacaria plateau. These travelers sought the free-roaming cattle herds multiplying in the southern pampas and hunted indigenous peoples to enslave them. Many settled in the area, becoming ranchers and small-scale farmers. Due to its coastal hills, the area was soon recognized for its strategic value as a vantage point for observation and control, holding military and political significance in the Portuguese expansion over Spanish territory. A fortification was established there in the late 18th century, but it was soon dismantled once the conquest was secured.

The construction of the Church of Saint Dominic in the early 19th century drew many scattered residents to its surroundings, forming the nucleus of a village. However, its development throughout the century was slow, despite receiving waves of German and Italian immigrants, and it relied on a largely subsistence economy. Significant economic, social, and urban growth began in the early 20th century when the city's scenic beauty, mild climate, and inviting beaches were recognized for their tourism potential and began to be developed. Since then, Torres has grown more robustly and rapidly, becoming one of the most sought-after beaches in the state, attracting a monthly floating population of 200,000 during the summer, many of whom are foreigners, primarily from the La Plata Basin countries. This contrasts with its permanent population of approximately 38,000 residents. Despite this, the city has developed a solid economy and infrastructure to meet this tourist demand, its primary source of income.

While tourism has brought progress and growth, positioning the city as a state hub for events, festivals, sports competitions, performances, and other attractions, it has also introduced significant environmental and cultural challenges. Once covered by the Atlantic Forest, an area of particularly rich biodiversity due to the diverse environments created by its complex geography, this natural heritage is now severely threatened and greatly diminished, with few preserved areas remaining. Many species have already been lost, and others are at risk. Reports also highlight issues of property speculation, pollution, poverty, and crime, all serious problems common in cities experiencing rapid growth. This expansion has also negatively impacted the city's historical and artistic heritage, as neither official institutions nor the population have yet developed sufficient awareness to slow the rapid pace of active destruction and passive loss of tangible and intangible cultural assets.

== History ==
=== Prehistory ===
The region of Torres, a coastal city in the Brazilian state of Rio Grande do Sul, has been inhabited by humans for thousands of years. The earliest groups to traverse it were hunter-gatherer peoples from the northern part of the continent, leaving various traces in the form of middens, large artificial mounds of shells often containing human burials and objects made of stone and bone, such as axes, net weights, hooks, arrowheads, and sculptures depicting birds, fish, cetaceans, quadrupeds, and rare anthropomorphic figures, along with other artifacts. During the Neolithic, these populations began to settle in the area, transitioning to a sedentary lifestyle, domesticating plants such as maize, peanut, tobacco, chili pepper, and potato for cultivation and becoming farmers. Evidence from this period also includes remnants of the Taquara culture, highland farmers who seasonally visited the coast to fish and collect mollusks to supplement their diet, setting up camps in areas bordering the restinga and dunes. Around the same time, the region experienced a new migratory wave, this time by the Guaranis, whose culture was more complex, with more intricate relics including ceramics and ritual objects, and it is believed they had developed basketry, featherwork, and weaving.

=== Portuguese colonization ===
The geography of the Torres area is unique. Situated on a long coastal plain stretching from Laguna to beyond Chuí, one of the world's longest continuous sandy beaches, it stands out because it is the only place along the shore with rocky outcrops, the volcanic basalt "towers" that gave the city its name. Additionally, the coastal plain, wider to the north and south, narrows at this point, making it a mandatory passage for those avoiding the Serra Geral plateaus when traveling between the south and north. Indigenous peoples had already recognized Torres as a natural pathway, creating trails there before the Portuguese arrived.

Colonization by Europeans began not long after the discovery of Brazil in 1500. A 1639 letter from King Philip IV of Spain to the Viceroy of Peru, the Marquis of Mancera, notes that paulistas had been advancing along Brazil's southern coast for some time. The trails opened by indigenous groups became the routes used by the Portuguese throughout the 17th century, coming from the north, to gradually claim territory that, under the Treaty of Tordesillas, belonged to Spain—the Portuguese territory ended at Laguna, Santa Catarina, much further north. A chronicle by Jerônimo Rodrigues describes the area as the frontier of the Ibirajara indigenous nation, which dominated up to the Mampituba River, with the Patos or Carijós to the north, though they frequently encroached on each other's lands.

Among the early white pioneers who ventured into these regions were slave hunters seeking indigenous captives and tropeiros gathering the cattle that multiplied freely in the pampas. Portugal, disregarding treaties, continued to encroach on Spanish lands. After the founding of Rio Grande in 1737 at the mouth of the Lagoa dos Patos, on the state's southern coast, the Portuguese established a military post at Imbé in 1738. However, this post could not control the entire area up to the Serra, and it became necessary to secure the narrowing of the coastal plain further north, where Torres would emerge. The Itapeva Rocks were the first site chosen, located about 60 km north of Imbé, where another military garrison was established. However, this site also proved to be insufficient, failing to cover a final trail used by cattle smugglers to pass undetected. By the late 17th century, the presence of some scattered Portuguese-Brazilian residents was recorded in the region.

From 1761, the granting of sesmarias between Itapeva and the Mampituba River is recorded, settling new colonists. In 1777, a battery with two cannons, named Fort of São Diogo das Torres, was erected on the eastern flank of Morro das Furnas, with the explicit purpose of controlling the Spanish, who had by then dominated Santa Catarina Island and threatened to advance south. The site was chosen for its elevated, unobstructed view over a wide area. However, following an armistice, the fort was abandoned, though its strategic value continued to be recognized and utilized. Consequently, Lieutenant-General Sebastião Xavier da Câmara, governor of the Captaincy of Rio Grande de São Pedro, ordered engineer José de Saldanha in 1797 to build a new guard post and military registry for controlling and taxing land passage, equipped with two caliber 4 cannons and a detachment of soldiers. The fort was a simple structure of wood and straw, with a small stone and tile house to store gunpowder. In 1801, Ensign Manuel Ferreira Porto assumed command of the garrison, considered the city's founder. With the creation of the captaincy's first municipalities in 1809, this area fell under the jurisdiction of Santo Antônio da Patrulha, becoming the Torres District.

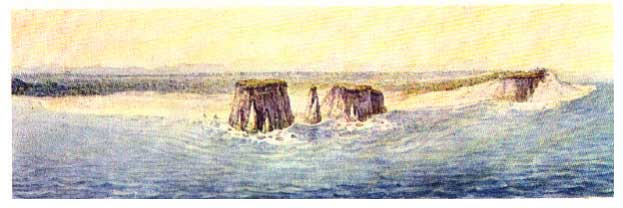
One of the earliest visual records of the Torres coastline, created by Debret in the early 19th century.

=== Early urbanization ===
No further records of the area exist until 1815, when the Bishop of Rio de Janeiro, Dom José Caetano da Silva Coutinho, whose diocese extended to this captaincy, passed through. At the request of some local ranchers, he authorized the construction of a chapel. In 1818, by decree of the Marquis of Alegrete, an area of 150 square braças was granted for the formation of a village and the building of the church, though construction began and soon halted due to the extreme poverty and disunity of the locals. The following year marked the arrival of Brigadier Francisco de Paula Soares de Gusmão, sent by the Count of Figueira, governor of the captaincy, to reinforce the fortification, which was again in ruins, and to inspect the Mampituba River bar and the northern coast to assess whether Spanish invaders could disembark there. Francisco concluded that a landing was impossible due to the absence of a natural port and the dangerous coastline for navigation. The Spanish threat, which had reemerged, did not materialize, and the fort lost its purpose. Francisco was ordered to return to the capital but, recognizing the site's favorable geographic position and its economic potential as a busy passageway to the Captaincy of Santa Catarina, requested to stay and establish the desired chapel to provide spiritual support for those within a 40-league radius who had to travel to Osório or Laguna for worship. With the request approved, the count ordered the start of the "Torres Settlement" in 1820 with some indigenous women from Taquarembó. Francisco arranged their marriages to white men and settled them in a village built on the banks of the Lagoa do Violão. He soon began work on the chapel and, before its completion, summoned Father Marcelino Lopes Falcão as chaplain. On Christmas 1820, the first mass was celebrated.

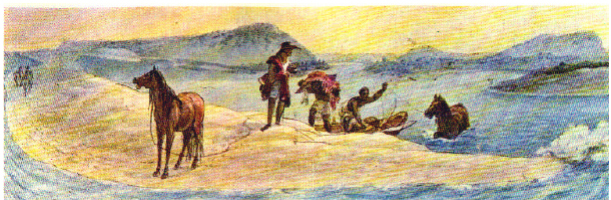
The Mampituba crossing, as depicted by Debret, early 19th century

In mid-1820, the French naturalist Augustin Saint-Hilaire visited, leaving a vivid account of the landscape, nature, and life of the residents. Upon arrival, he found Ensign Porto commanding about 30 indigenous slaves working on the fort's structures. In Itapeva, he stayed in a wattle-and-daub hut with palm leaf roofing, "without a door and (with) a room devoid of windows and furniture, where the family's white clothing and garments are hung on beams." Despite the dwelling's poverty, the lady of the house wore an elegant dress and styled her hair tastefully. At Estância do Meio, four leagues further, he saw only "a few miserable shacks." For meals, "they unroll a mat on the floor and serve the soup there, with the whole family gathered around."

However, Francisco states that military command passed to Ensign Porto only the following year, and activity then waned. After the Independence of Brazil, in 1824, the new governor of the Province of São Pedro do Rio Grande do Sul, the Viscount of São Leopoldo, passed through, recognizing the site's potential and Francisco de Paula's prior efforts, and reappointed him to settle the village and complete the chapel, which was done in 1825, when it was established as a curate chapel. The chapel, now known as the Church of Saint Dominic, attracted several families who were already settled nearby. This caused the village to grow, and within four years, it had more than 1,000 inhabitants. Francisco de Paula's correspondence reveals his enthusiasm for the project, helping new settlers establish themselves, opening streets, installing fountains, creating a cemetery, a parish house, a jail, and other improvements, often at his own expense, while also requesting additional human and material resources from the captaincy government. By this time, he was already envisioning the construction of a port and the regularization of the Mampituba River bar.

In 1826, the City Council of Santo Antônio da Patrulha began settling over 100 German immigrant families, Protestants in Três Forquilhas and Catholics in São Pedro de Alcântara, a few leagues inland from the initial Torres settlement core. However, a passing German traveler, Carl Seidler, reported that land distribution was uneven, with Catholics receiving better plots, causing frequent disputes with Protestants, sometimes escalating to "not uncommon bloody clashes and even the most barbaric slaughters." He further noted that the region was still plagued by indigenous attacks, killing people and causing destruction, resulting in population decline rather than growth.

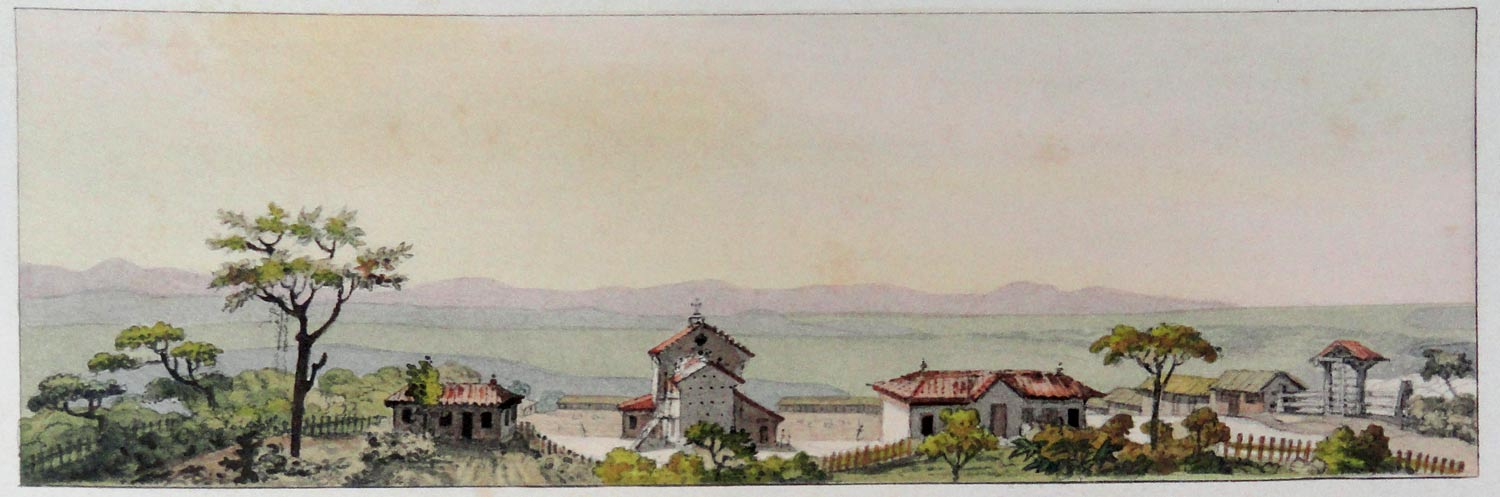
Debret: View of the chapel's rear from the top of Morro do Farol, early 19th century

Francisco de Paula remained in charge of the village for about ten years and later provided an account of the living conditions at the time:

"The abundance of freshwater and saltwater fish, combined with the surplus of essential goods favored by nature, ensures that there is surely no place in the Province like Torres for the poor to live. Here, bananas, which form a significant part of the diet for slaves and children, are available year-round; English potatoes, the bread of the settlers in the absence of corn, are plentiful everywhere, yielding two harvests a year.... The Torres District is extremely fertile; drought is unknown here.... and thus farmers have two harvests of beans and corn every year.... Cassava is also abundant, so much so that flour is sold at a low price. The District's lands are incomparably good for agriculture.... There is much marshy land suitable for rice planting, and it was in this branch of agriculture that I wished to see the inhabitants engaged.... The District is rich in construction timber, maintaining very active trade with Palmares and Mostardas.... The people of Mostardas bring horses, oxen, and cows from their district and with these goods buy carts, jerky, grease, wheat, rye, sheepskins, leather for tanning, and some woolen fabrics, but in exchange, they take corn, beans, and flour in their carts. The highlanders also conduct significant trade with Torres."

Despite Francisco's optimistic views, the village's survival was precarious, worsened by frequent disputes with the City Council of Santo Antônio over excessive taxes, arbitrary fishing bans, irregular land division, and other conflicts, as well as the outbreak of the Ragamuffin War in 1835, which caused hardship and turmoil, with the area alternately occupied by imperial and rebel forces. Amid the conflict, in 1837, it was elevated to a freguesia named Freguesia de São Domingos das Torres.

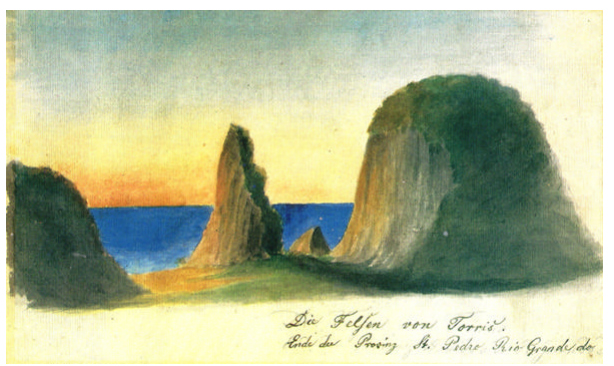
Herrmann Rudolf Wendroth: Praia da Guarita, 1852.

Official reports from the period are filled with complaints about poor conditions and pleas for aid from the capital. In 1846, only 187 registered landowners and fewer than 150 voters existed in the city. These factors led to the emancipation in 1857 of the then Conceição do Arroio District, now Osório, which separated from Santo Antônio and incorporated the Torres District. At this time, internal navigation through the region's network of lagoons and channels was intensifying, creating a connection between the northern coast and Porto Alegre for people and goods. Several local deputies and administrators sought to promote progress, with a consensus that the region had significant untapped potential, but the Province itself was not wealthy and could do little, and complaints of poverty persisted. Heinrich Handelmann, visiting in 1860, lamented:

"The state of both colonies, Três Forquilhas and Torres, with roughly a thousand souls combined, is therefore deplorable; while the inhabitants have the necessities for subsistence, the lack of regular outlets for their products deprives them of the incentive to be active workers in agriculture and industry; cut off from communication with the Province's people and their old homeland, the colonies remain as if buried in the wilderness, inevitably degenerating spiritually."

The village experienced a period of social, cultural, urban, and economic stagnation that persisted until the early 20th century. It is surprising, then, that it was elevated to village status and then city status in a single act in 1878. Naturally, it lost its higher status and was reannexed to Osório. It regained municipal status only in 1890. The Proclamation of the Republic brought primarily political unrest to the city, with several administrators succeeding each other in a short period. Another disruption was the Federalist Revolution of 1893, which saw the city serve as a passage for troops. In the same year, families of Italian immigrants who failed to settle in the Caxias do Sul region began arriving, descending the Serra. Wealth remained elusive for the population. A summary of about thirty inventories left by the deceased between 1896 and 1898 indicates that nearly half the families still lacked a dining table in their homes.

=== Progress ===
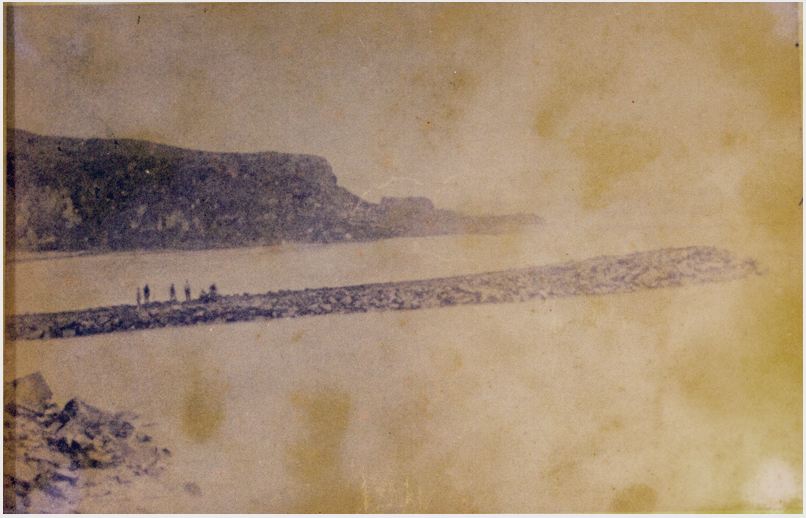
The Guarita jetty, 1892

In 1892, the idea of a port in Torres regained momentum. The construction of jetties at Praia da Guarita was initiated to provide shelter for ships transporting materials for the port's development. The stones for the jetties were sourced from the nearby hills, blasted with dynamite, but the project was soon abandoned, with only 50m of one jetty built. At the turn of the 20th century, Torres became frequent news in the capital's newspapers (over 300 mentions between 1895 and 1912), with debates focusing on utilizing channels and lagoons for internal navigation and the old idea of building a port; there was also talk of constructing a railway. These projects would undoubtedly have accelerated growth, but they did not materialize as hoped. The solution to the socioeconomic and cultural lag came from another source, almost by chance.

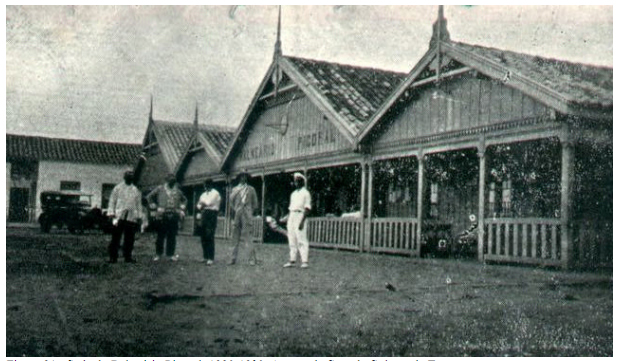
Balneário Picoral around 1925

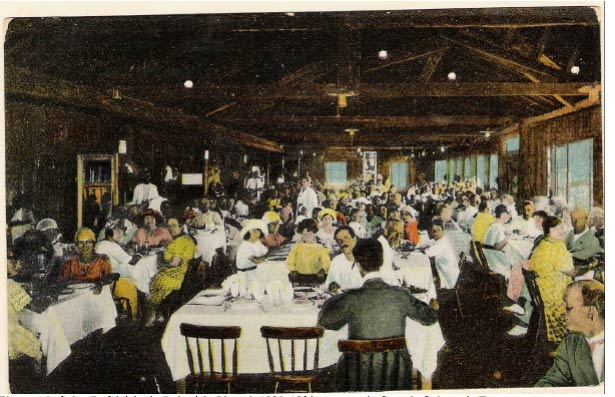
Dining hall of Balneário Picoral in the 1930s

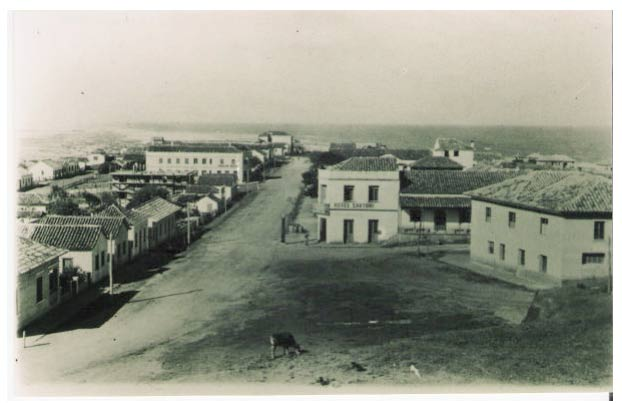
The new "noble zone" of Torres, around 1930

At the same time, Brazil was striving to modernize, looking to Europe for models of civilization; among other adopted trends, the upper class started to accept the European tradition of taking vacations and the practice of swimming in the sea, which was seen as a healing activity. Thus, in 1910, the first vacationers arrived from the Gaucho highlands and Porto Alegre. However, there were no good roads, and the journey, lasting three to four days, was arduous, typically by cart or mule, requiring travelers to bring food and other essentials for minimal comfort, as no specialized infrastructure for visitors had yet been developed. These pioneer vacationers often camped by the sea or stayed in one of the local's modest guesthouses. Their customs were austere, as Mário de Freitas recounted: men, upon arrival, acquired a pajama, a pair of clogs, a straw hat, and a locally carved wooden cane. Women typically wore only a chintz or opal robe, with slippers or sandals. Baths were taken early in the morning, following a ritual based on contemporary medical ideas, with bathers receiving a predetermined number of waves, repeated over nine baths, after which the "treatment" was deemed complete.

Among the figures who significantly boosted Torres' development, José Antônio Picoral stands out as the first to recognize and capitalize on the city's tourism potential. A native of the São Pedro de Alcântara colony, he became a prosperous merchant in Porto Alegre while maintaining ties to his hometown. After a disappointing vacation in Tramandaí, Picoral envisioned transforming Torres into a modern seaside resort. In 1915, after discussions with João Pacheco de Freitas, Luiz André Maggi, Carlos Voges, and other locals, he established the Balneário Picoral, initially based at the Voges Hotel, soon renamed Picoral Hotel, a historic milestone in introducing tourism to Torres and the state's largest tourism venture at the time. It featured large pavilions for communal activities such as meals and parties and a series of chalets for lodging, organized in a block that became the social hub of its era and created the city's "noble zone" around it, opening a promising alternative economic path for the city's growth.

The habit of spending summers by the sea gradually spread, and by the 1920s, Torres had become a fashionable destination for Rio Grande do Sul residents. The introduction of the Torres-Capital bus line only slightly improved travel, as the roads remained rough and prone to flooding. There are humorous accounts of passengers pushing buses stuck in the mud while teams of mules or oxen attempted to move the vehicles. This did not seem to bother them. According to accounts, they enjoyed the experience, knowing they would soon relax on the beach with friends and family.

These new visitors brought others, and the city began to transform its urban profile, with guesthouses, other hotels such as Farol and Sartori, markets, new streets, and multiplying summer homes. Balneário Picoral became a meeting point for the state's politicians and wealthy people, hosting literary soirees, elegant balls, and music recitals in its halls. Soon, prominent figures such as Borges de Medeiros, Protásio Alves, Possidônio Cunha, Firmino Torely, and others began purchasing land to build refined summer chalets.

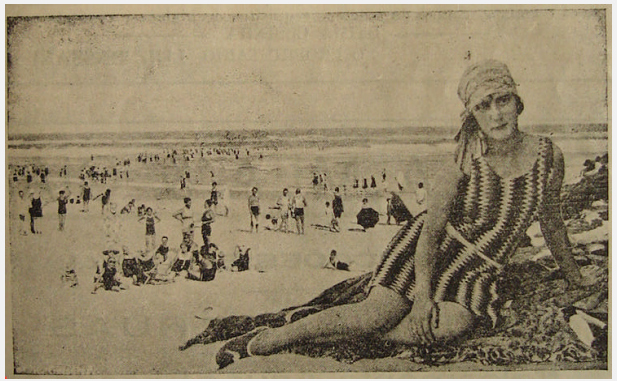
Bather in fashionable attire, photo published in A Gaivota magazine, year XI, no. 11, 1939

Cardoso notes that during this phase, the city's tourism industry took shape, and it began to be seen as a civilized place where nature had been tamed and harnessed for human use. This idea was particularly encouraged by prominent doctors of the time, such as Protásio Alves, who emphasized the benefits of contact with the sea and beaches. However, from the outset of this rise to a new status, Torres developed a peculiar identity as a vacation city, bustling for three months of the year while markedly quieter the rest of the time. Another change was the gradual exclusion of local farmers and fishermen from fully participating in this civilizing process, with distinct and exclusive spaces for socialization and housing created. Many locals, during the summer, abandoned their usual trades to work as cleaners, nannies, stable hands, cooks, gardeners, or employees in the growing number of hotels. Simultaneously, due to these groups of outsiders, most of whom knew and frequented each other, the beach took on a familial character. In this process of "taking possession" and transforming the city by vacationers, in 1936, several prominent figures gathered in the "noble hall" of Balneário Picoral to establish the Society of Friends of Torres Beach (SAPT), driven by the "ardent desire expressed by most vacationers on this beach to found a society that supports and promotes, by all legal means available, noble initiatives aimed at the well-being, comfort, and safety of the population." The SAPT effectively became a decisive force in shaping the city's future.

In the 1950s, with improved roads, progress arrived more quickly. Speaking of that period, Renato Costa shared his personal experience:

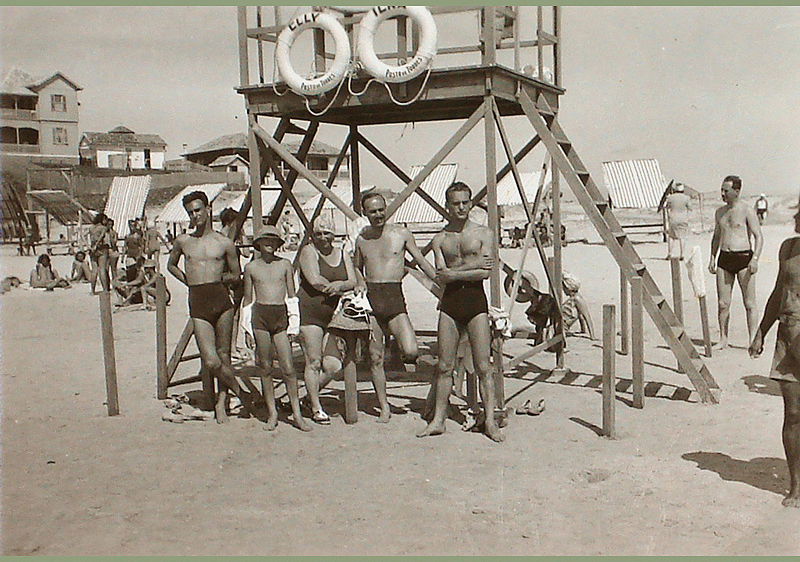
Bathers at Praia Grande, 1960s

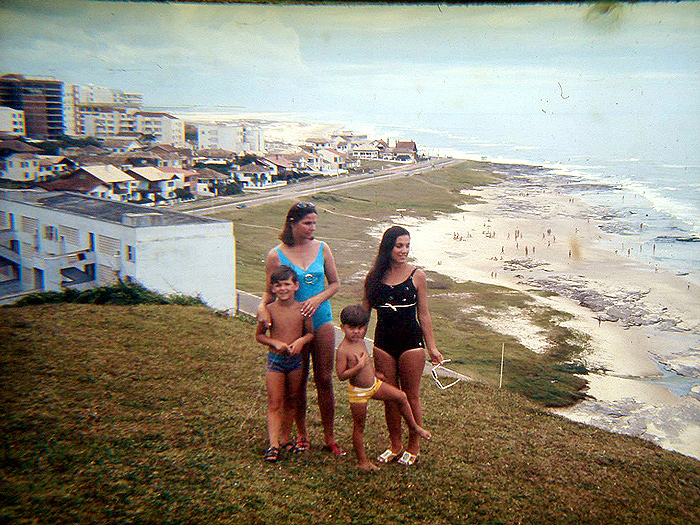
Vacationers in the 1970s, with several multi-story buildings visible on the left, attesting to urban transformation

"[...] the situation has completely changed. Not only is the journey made on excellent highways, but there is now a widespread trend to provide vacationers with more dignified and efficient material comfort. The visit we made to Torres last Saturday and Sunday was a huge surprise that filled us with pride. We could not have imagined that, in so few years, a small village like Torres could be completely remodeled, fully paved (on the verge of having its streets asphalted), broadly lit, with a supply of clear and fresh running water! And, what's more, with numerous and magnificent private residences of refined architectural taste."

The following decades confirmed Torres as a tourist city with a seasonal economy, while its districts began to become more dynamic, organizing into more or less self-sufficient urban centers. This trend led to the emancipation of several districts. In 1988, Três Cachoeiras and Arroio do Sal separated; in 1992, Três Forquilhas and Morrinhos do Sul.

Torres has developed in recent decades and continues to maintain its prestige as one of the most popular beaches in Rio Grande do Sul, but it has begun to face challenges typical of development, such as uncontrolled land occupation, environmental degradation, and the formation of poverty pockets.

Current concerns of public administration include addressing these issues through sustainable management models, engaging previously excluded groups, preserving memory and historical and cultural heritage, fostering the arts, and breaking the pattern of seasonality to create a balanced, year-round economy.

== Geography ==
Torres is part of the Metropolitan Mesoregion of Porto Alegre and the Osório Microregion. It is located at a latitude of 29º20'34" south and a longitude of 49º43'39" west, at an altitude of 16 meters. It has an area of 161.624 km². It is 197 km from Porto Alegre and 280 km from Florianópolis. Its borders are the municipality of Passo de Torres (SC) to the north, Arroio do Sal to the south, Mampituba, Dom Pedro de Alcântara, and Morrinhos do Sul to the west, and the Atlantic Ocean to the east.

=== Geology and hydrography ===
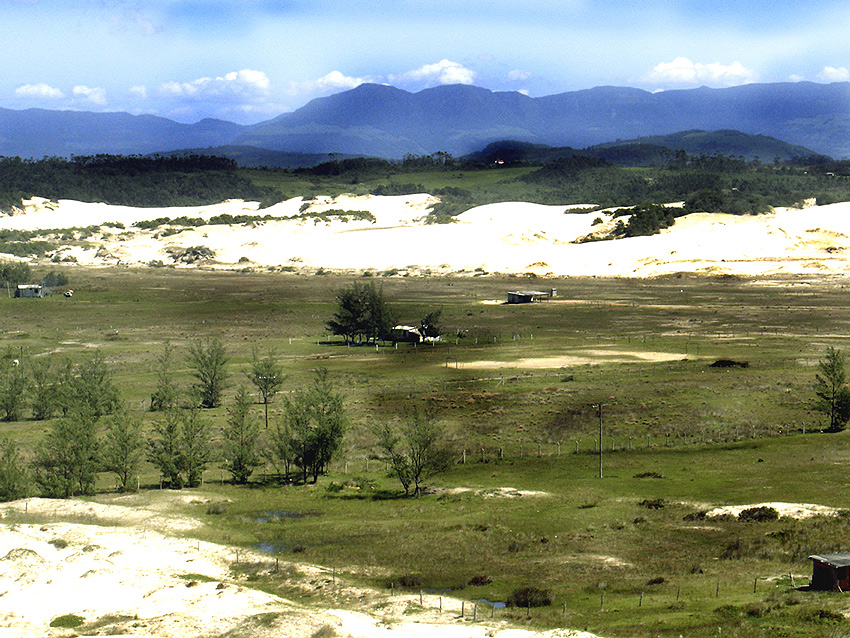
View of Serra Geral in the background of Praia da Guarita, with dunes and small rocky elevations in the foreground

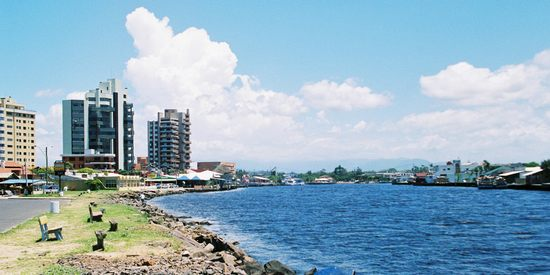
Mampituba River

The city is located on the southern Brazilian coast, characterized by a wide coastal plain extending from Cabo de Santa Marta in Santa Catarina to the Barra do Chuí in Rio Grande do Sul, one of the longest and most continuous sandy beaches known. The stretch is dotted with a complex system of quartzitic sandy barriers that delimit a series of shallow lakes, lagoons, and channels, such as the Itapeva, Jacaré, and Violão lagoons, in various evolutionary stages, with a tendency to transform into coastal marshes. This system is technically described as a multiple complex coastal barrier, developed during the last three major sea level variation cycles in the Pleistocene and Holocene. In recent times, these water bodies have experienced significant reduction, leading to changes in their salinity and ecology.

Another significant water formation is the Mampituba River basin, which serves an area inhabited by over 12,000 people and crosses areas within the Atlantic Forest Biosphere Reserve. Its surface area is 11,300 hectares, with a perimeter of 14.5 km. The Mampituba River originates in the Serra Geral and flows into the Atlantic Ocean at Torres after a 62-km course, defining the border between Santa Catarina and Rio Grande do Sul in its lower reaches. On the Rio Grande do Sul side, its tributaries include the Pavão River and two significant lagoons that overflow through the Forno River: the Morro do Forno Lagoon, formed by the Mengue River and the Pacas River, and the Jacaré Lagoon. In Santa Catarina, it receives waters from the large Sombrio Lagoon and the Sertão River, its main tributary.

At Torres, the coastal plain is particularly narrow, compressed against the escarpments of the Serra Geral, which extends fragments to the beach, forming the only rocky promontory along this extensive coast, the cliffs of Torres, popularly known as "towers," which gave the city its name. The rocks extend under the sea and emerge 2 km from the coast, forming the small Ilha dos Lobos, the only island off the Rio Grande do Sul coast, rising just about 2m above sea level and responsible for several shipwrecks.

The city's terrain is formed by a substrate of aeolian sandstones from the Botucatu Formation, dated to the Jurassic/Cretaceous boundary, consisting of sandstones with large- to medium-scale cross-stratification, planar or channeled, with rare intercalations of sandstones with plane-parallel stratification and commonly alternating layers of fine and medium sandstone. Over this layer occurred successive lava flows from the Serra Geral Formation, dated to the Mesozoic, primarily composed of basalts and tholeiitic basalt-andesites, contrasting with rhyolites and rhyodacites.

Consistent with trends observed along this sandy coast, erosion of the shoreline by wind and sea level variations during storms, surges, and changes in wave patterns is noted. The adjacent continental shelf has a gentle slope of 2m/km, with typical linear sandy banks.

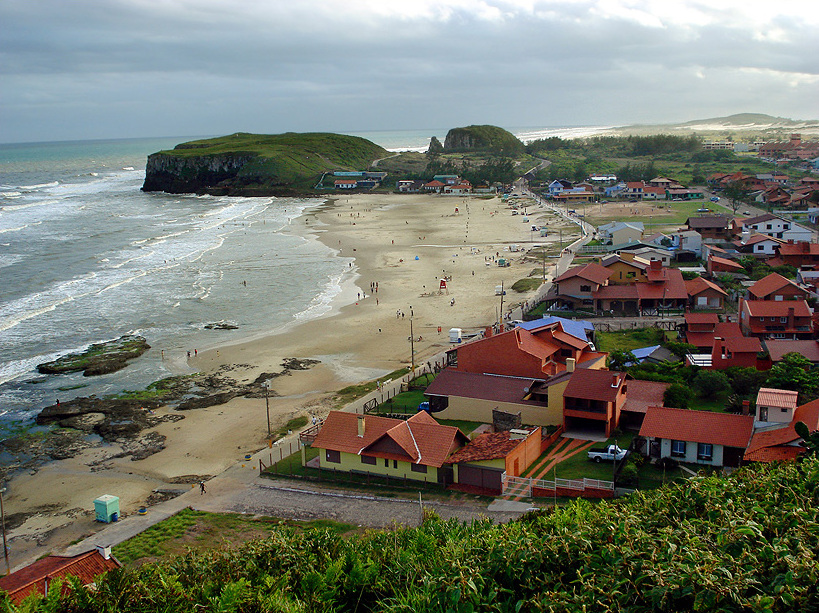
Praia da Cal viewed from Morro do Farol. The first cliff is Morro das Furnas, followed by Morro da Guarita, and in the distance, at the top right, Morro de Itapeva

The municipal coastline is divided into five main beaches, whose boundaries are formed by various rocky elevations. From north to south:

- Praia Grande, 2 km long, extends from the Mampituba River bar to the first shallow, unnamed rocky outcrop; it is the preferred beach for swimming and hosts most summer outdoor sports events and shows.
- Praia do Meio or Prainha, 600m, continuing to Morro do Farol; it is less suitable for swimming due to numerous rocks on the seabed.
- Praia da Cal, between Morro do Farol and Morro das Furnas, named for the former presence of kilns that roasted shells from middens to produce lime.
- Praia da Guarita, between Morro das Furnas and Morro da Guarita, adjacent to the ecological park bearing its name.
- Praia de Itapeva, from Morro da Guarita to Morro de Itapeva (in Tupi, "flat stone"), the longest at 6 km, the farthest from the urban center, and thus the least frequented.

=== Climate ===
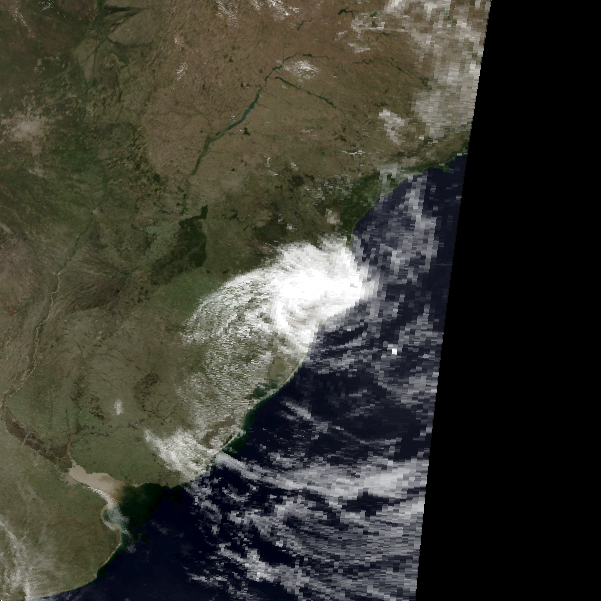
Hurricane Catarina in a satellite image on March 28, 2004

Torres has a humid subtropical climate, influenced by tropical and polar air masses, with the Atlantic tropical air mass predominating. There is abundant and regular precipitation year-round with no dry season, with an annual rainfall of 1,580 millimeters (mm). The average annual mean temperature is approximately 20 °C, with significant thermal amplitude throughout the year. With high levels of relative humidity, the amount of insolation is about 2,100 hours per year.

Highest 24-hour precipitation accumulations recorded in Torres by month (INMET, 1961–present)
Month	Accumulation	Date	Month	Accumulation	Date
January	173 mm	01/19/2011	July	98.6 mm	07/21/2001
February	257.3 mm	02/14/2014	August	115 mm	08/09/1985
March	213 mm	03/19/2014	September	138.1 mm	09/12/1988
April	116 mm	04/12/2016	October	99.2 mm	10/01/2001
May	133.2 mm	05/08/2004	November	104.7 mm	11/15/1983
June	152.6 mm	06/28/1982	December	181.8 mm	12/03/1980

Occasionally, extratropical cyclones form along the coast, bringing strong winds, surges, and storms, primarily affecting maritime activities such as fishing and swimming, and potentially causing flooding and damage to structures. In 2004, the region was hit by Hurricane Catarina, a phenomenon previously unknown to Brazilians, which left a trail of destruction in Torres, damaging 1,500 homes and causing one death.

According to data from the National Institute of Meteorology (INMET), since 1961, the lowest temperature recorded in Torres was −0.2 °C on June 8, 2012, and the highest reached 41.4 °C on December 25 of the same year. The highest 24-hour precipitation accumulation was 257.3 mm on February 14, 2014, followed by 213 mm on March 19, 2014, 181.8 mm on December 3, 1980, 173 mm on January 19, 2011, and 152.6 mm on June 28, 1982. September 2009 was the rainiest month, with 440.3 mm. Since June 2006, the strongest wind gust reached 112.3 km/h (31.2 m/s) in the early morning of December 11, 2012.

Climate data for Torres (1991–2020 normals, extremes 1961–present)
Month	Jan	Feb	Mar	Apr	May	Jun	Jul	Aug	Sep	Oct	Nov	Dec	Year
Record high °C (°F)	36.0 (96.8)	34.5 (94.1)	37.8 (100.0)	34.6 (94.3)	33.8 (92.8)	32.7 (90.9)	33.5 (92.3)	35.8 (96.4)	36.0 (96.8)	33.9 (93.0)	35.0 (95.0)	41.4 (106.5)	41.4 (106.5)
Mean daily maximum °C (°F)	27.4 (81.3)	27.6 (81.7)	27.1 (80.8)	25.2 (77.4)	22.2 (72.0)	19.9 (67.8)	18.7 (65.7)	19.5 (67.1)	20.3 (68.5)	22.3 (72.1)	24.1 (75.4)	26.2 (79.2)	23.4 (74.1)
Daily mean °C (°F)	23.9 (75.0)	24.0 (75.2)	23.3 (73.9)	21.1 (70.0)	17.9 (64.2)	15.4 (59.7)	14.3 (57.7)	15.5 (59.9)	16.9 (62.4)	19.1 (66.4)	20.7 (69.3)	22.7 (72.9)	19.6 (67.3)
Mean daily minimum °C (°F)	20.8 (69.4)	20.9 (69.6)	19.9 (67.8)	17.5 (63.5)	14.3 (57.7)	11.8 (53.2)	10.8 (51.4)	12.0 (53.6)	13.8 (56.8)	16.2 (61.2)	17.4 (63.3)	19.4 (66.9)	16.2 (61.2)
Record low °C (°F)	11.2 (52.2)	13.5 (56.3)	10.2 (50.4)	6.3 (43.3)	4.2 (39.6)	−0.2 (31.6)	1.2 (34.2)	1.0 (33.8)	3.0 (37.4)	7.0 (44.6)	8.8 (47.8)	8.6 (47.5)	−0.2 (31.6)
Average precipitation mm (inches)	168.6 (6.64)	172.2 (6.78)	152.6 (6.01)	108.1 (4.26)	121.1 (4.77)	103.0 (4.06)	121.8 (4.80)	125.7 (4.95)	138.3 (5.44)	144.4 (5.69)	112.6 (4.43)	114.6 (4.51)	1,583 (62.32)
Average precipitation days (≥ 1.0 mm)	12	12	10	8	8	8	9	8	10	11	9	9	114
Average relative humidity (%)	83.4	83.6	82.6	82.3	83.8	85.1	85.1	85.1	84.6	84.2	81.9	82.5	83.7
Mean monthly sunshine hours	202.3	174.2	189.1	177.8	170.0	140.4	160.6	162.0	147.7	160.8	193.6	211.5	2,090
Source: Instituto Nacional de Meteorologia (sun 1961–1990)

=== Environment ===
The Torres area is part of the Atlantic Forest biome, locally characterized by the predominance of tropical moist forest. According to the 1999 definition by the National Environment Council, the Torres area is characterized as restinga,

"a set of ecosystems comprising distinct plant communities in terms of flora and physiognomy. These ecosystems are located on predominantly sandy terrains of marine, fluvial, lagoonal, aeolian, or combined origins, dating back to the Quaternary period. These soils are generally poorly developed. These plant communities form an edaphic and pioneer vegetational complex that is more dependent on soil characteristics than on climate. They are found on beaches, dunes, and in associated depressions, plains, and terraces."

The city's geomorphological and hydrological diversity supports the formation of distinct ecosystems. Situated in a transition zone between the mountains, the coast, and the pampas, the city features dunes, beaches, rocky shores, wetlands, lagoons, fields, forests, and restingas. Each ecosystem has its own specific flora and fauna. Many tropical species reach their southern limit in this region, such as Ipomoea pes-caprae, Aniba firmula, Licaria armeniaca, Ormosia arborea, Clusia criuva, while others typical of the pampas and highlands reach their northern limit, such as Acathosyris spinescens, Jordina rhombifolia, Regnellidium diphyllum, Berberis laurina, Discaria americana, and others. The coastal zone serves as a migratory route for birds that inhabit coastal habitats. This category includes over 60 species found in the North Coast of Rio Grande do Sul, though these species do not make their nests there.

Torres is under significant environmental pressure, with uncontrolled land occupation, rapid urbanization, deforestation, pollution, and destruction of the natural environment, as well as predatory fishing and hunting. In the words of Guadagnin et alii,

"Estuaries and lagoons face pressure from organic contamination caused by resorts, water extraction for irrigation, landfills and waste disposal, as well as sport and commercial fishing. Wetlands and restinga forests face severe pressure from agricultural expansion and resorts. Populations of commercially valuable species in the lagoons are heavily depleted, and kingfish species are in critical condition. The main pressure vectors in inland lagoons are pesticide contamination through the Três Forquilhas and Maquiné river drainage basins and modification of habitats along the margins, which are important for fish spawning. Pay-to-fish activities, which are generally developed in reservoirs using exotic species, are expanding, with the potential to invade natural systems and introduce diseases and pathogens."

There remains rich biodiversity in Torres, but nearly all large native carnivores and herbivores are locally extinct, with only a few capybaras, broad-snouted caimans and migrating fur seals from Patagonia surviving. Until the 1980s, fur seals gathered in large groups on Ilha dos Lobos, named after them, to mate, but were heavily hunted for damaging fishermen's nets, and their presence is now rarer. Dolphins, whales, botos, and sea turtles also appear. Among the threatened animal species in the region are the aforementioned caiman (Caiman latirostris), the whitemouth croaker (Micropogonias furnieri), six species of silverside, Physalaemus riograndensis, Liolaemus occipitalis, the fulvous whistling duck (Dendrocygna bicolor), and the brown howler (Allouata fusca). Among threatened flora are the jelly palm (Butia capitata), Vriesea psittacina, the purple glory tree (Pleroma granulosum), the juçara (Euterpe edulis), the buriti (Trithrinax brasiliensis), Eupatorium ulei, Rourea gracilis, and Merostachys pluriflora, some of which are endemic.

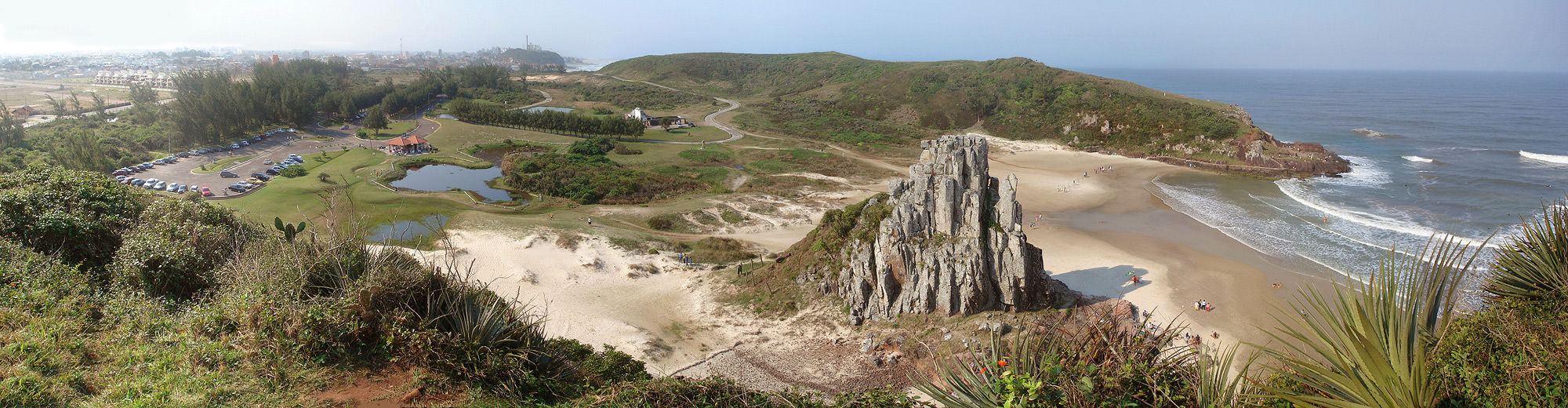
Section of the Guarita State Park

There are four environmental preservation areas in the city: the Ilha dos Lobos Ecological Reserve, owned by the Federal Government with just two hectares, the Torres State Park, with 15 ha, the Itapeva State Park, with 1,000 ha, and the Guarita State Park, with 350 ha. These are insufficient to protect the region's many threatened species, as there is neither enough protected area nor complete biological representativeness in the protected areas. Except for the Ilha dos Lobos reserve, all others have areas invaded by irregular housing or are part of older urbanized zones, where residents routinely violate conservation rules by occupying land, dumping sewage and debris, hunting, fishing, and interfering with vegetation, intensifying environmental pressure and degrading areas previously in good condition. The island itself, though landing is prohibited, is impacted by tourist boats, surfers, and especially clandestine fishing vessels casting nets close to its underwater rocks to catch fish schools. The state government has acknowledged the precarious situation of its reserves, suffering from chronic shortages of financial resources, infrastructure, and personnel. In reality, no pristine natural environment remains in the Torres region. On the other hand, some environmental NGOs are active, and public authorities have given some attention to the issue, such as organizing the Itapeva State Park Management Plan, the Itapeva Lagoon Management and Conservation Forum, and the North Coast Integrated Ecological Corridor program, through which several pilot projects for sustainable use of the coastal plain and Atlantic Forest resources are being developed.

=== Demography ===
In the 2010 Brazilian Census, Torres had a population of 34,646 inhabitants, with 33,329 residing in the urban area and 1,317 in the rural area. The population density is 407.09 inhabitants/km² in the urban area and 21.94 inhabitants/km² in the rural area, averaging 147.75 inhabitants/km².

In the 2000 census, the population composition included about 90% whites, 7.7% pardos, and 1.6% blacks, with very small proportions of other ethnicities.

As a tourist city, it is estimated that during the three-month summer season (December, January, and February), the population increases significantly. Although no systematic surveys of the seasonal population exist, an estimate by the City Hall published in the 2010s suggested the population could rise by an additional 500,000 people, comprising 400,000 tourists and 100,000 fixed vacationers.

Data from the 2010 Census showed that the vast majority of permanent residents belong to the Roman Catholic religion (c. 85%), followed by Evangelicals (c. 8.6%), with the most numerous being Pentecostals (c. 4.4%) and Lutherans (c. 2.8%). Other denominations collectively account for only a few hundred adherents, and about 3.5% declared no religion.

In 2010, its Human Development Index (HDI) was 0.762, ranking 59th in the state and showing steady improvement in the historical series since 1991. In 2003, the incidence of poverty was 23.44%, with lower and upper limits of 13.63% and 33.26%, respectively. The incidence of subjective poverty was 18.13%, and the Gini coefficient was 0.40.

== Economy ==
According to 2008 IBGE data, Torres had a GDP of 378.4 million reais and a GDP per capita of 11,232.57 reais; a Gross Value Added from agriculture of 18.2 million reais, from industry of 36.1 million reais, and from services of 283.7 million reais; and collected 30 million reais in taxes on products net of subsidies. In terms of public finances, budget revenues reached 52.3 million reais, while the active debt was 2.27 million reais. Budget expenditures totaled around 46.4 million reais, approximately half of which was allocated to personnel and social charges. Its Municipal Participation Fund value was 11.1 million reais. In the IBGE's Central Business Registry, 1,961 active units were recorded, employing 8,627 people, of which 6,397 were salaried. Total salaries in that year reached 73.8 million reais, with an average salary of 2.3 minimum wages. The city's primary economic activity is tourism.

The primary sector accounts for 15% of the municipality's economy. In the 2006 Agricultural Census, the vast majority of rural producers were individual owners, with a total of 5,304 ha, mainly dedicated to temporary crops (3,043 ha) and pastures (1,329 ha). The main crops in 2009 were rice (20,250 tons), banana (4,140 tons), sugarcane (3,480 tons), cassava (1,120 tons), and pineapple (202,000 fruits), followed distantly by maize (525 tons), tobacco (454 tons), tomato (360 tons), sweet potato (140 tons), bean (81 tons), orange (39 tons), onion (30 tons), tangerine (20 tons), garlic (8 tons), and peanut (5 tons). The pig herd totaled 11,450 heads; cattle, 5,317; roosters, pullets, chickens, and chicks, 2,000 animals, 3,300 hens, and small numbers of sheep, quail, and rabbits. Production included 275,000 liters of milk, 13,000 dozen hen eggs, 5,000 dozen quail eggs, 2,200 kg of honey, and 640 kg of wool. The Agriculture Secretariat, in partnership with EMATER, has been encouraging agricultural diversification through the cultivation of passion fruit and horticultural products and has implemented reservoirs for irrigation and fish farming.

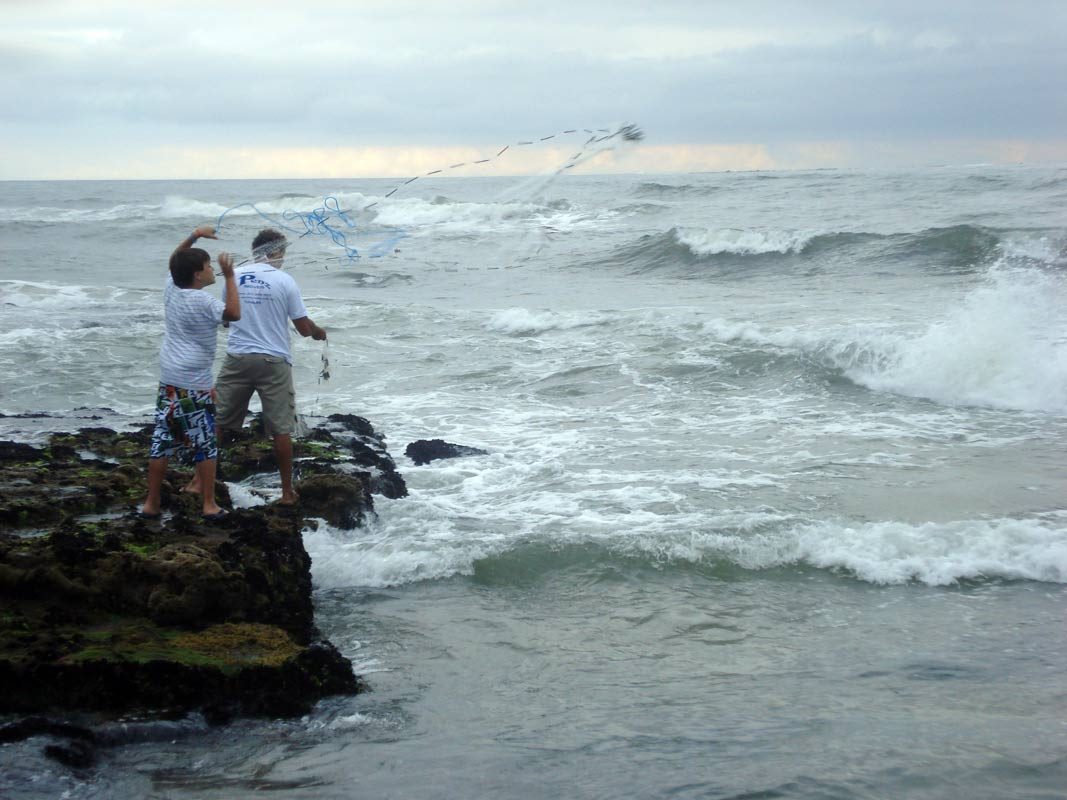
Fishing with a cast net at Praia do Meio.

Additionally, some minerals are extracted: sand, clay, basalt, and sandstone. There is also energy potential due to the recent discovery of a peat deposit, which can be used as fuel, near the Morro do Forno Lagoon.

As a coastal city, Torres also has fishing activity, which, though declining, is transitioning from shore-based to boat-based fishing, partly because shore fishing faced challenges due to the increasing influx of bathers and surfers during summer. To avoid conflicts, specific legislation was created, defining permitted areas for each activity. Public authorities have sought to provide professional training and legal certification for fishermen, as well as promote artisanal fishing. Boats can catch up to 3 tons of fish per trip, with the most sought-after species being mullet, croaker, hake, codling, shark, catfish, flounder, trahira, and midshipman fish. Fishing is also practiced in the region's lagoons and rivers.

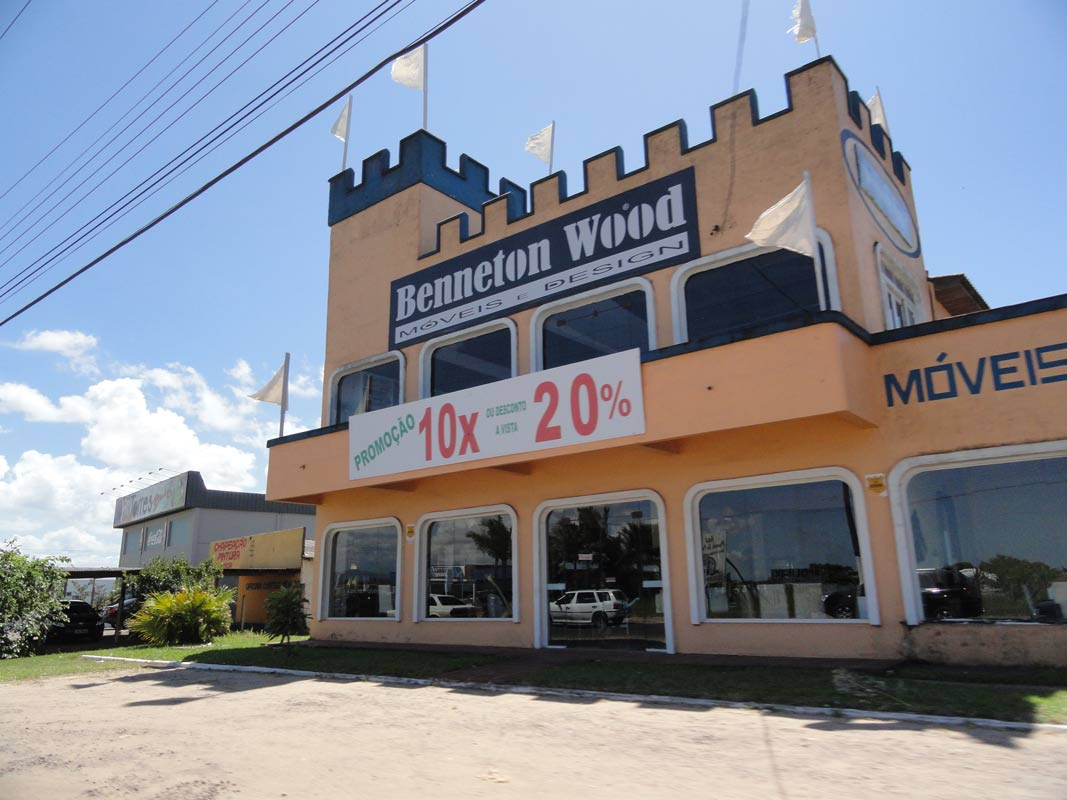
Design furniture store in Torres

The industry, still nascent, represents about 5% of Torres' economic activity. In 1996, there were 51 industries, predominantly in furniture and woodworks, clothing, and primary product processing (sugarcane mills, distilleries of cachaça, rice hullers, tobacco kilns, and home-based food industries). Conversely, commerce, driven by tourism, is well-developed, with emphasis on the food sector (17.80%), textiles, clothing, and footwear (3.36%), durable consumer goods (2.77%), and hardware, tools, and construction materials (2.67%). Commerce is primarily retail (31%), with wholesale trade accounting for 7% of the economy. The same tourism factor, contributing nearly 40% of the municipality's total revenue, has fueled a recent boom in construction. In 2010 alone, 30 residential buildings were constructed, and since 2008, the number has reached 117, predominantly high- and medium-standard investments; the challenge now is balancing urban development needs with environmental preservation. The service sector had 516 registered companies in 1999, favoring tourism and repair, maintenance, and mechanics sectors, with 8.33%. The city has branches of the Caixa Econômica Federal, Banco do Brasil, Banrisul, Sicredi, and Bradesco banks.

=== Tourism ===
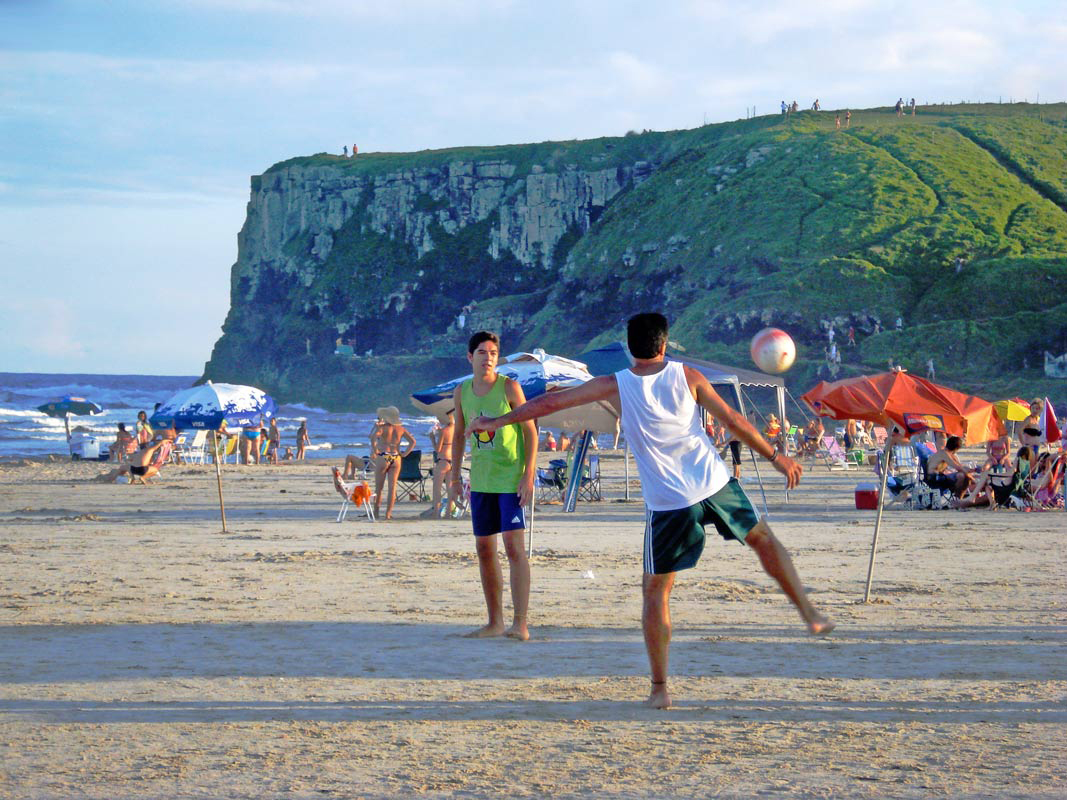
Vacationers enjoying Praia da Cal in the summer of 2011. In the background, Morro das Furnas

Torres thrives primarily on tourism, fueled by its stunning natural landscape and inviting beaches. As previously noted, this tourism potential was first recognized in the early 20th century by José Picoral, who envisioned the city as an attractive resort for residents of the state's interior, particularly Porto Alegre, offering basic hotel infrastructure. Following his initiative, Torres soon became a fashionable resort for Rio Grande do Sul residents, a reputation that persists today.

It is estimated that during the three-month summer season (December, January, and February), the population increases significantly. Although no systematic surveys of the seasonal population exist, an estimate by the Municipal Prefecture published in the 2010s suggested the population could rise by an additional 500,000 people, comprising 400,000 tourists and 100,000 fixed vacationers.

Consequently, the city has developed a robust tourism infrastructure, with a large number of hotels of all levels and types, including guesthouses and pet-friendly hotels, and a strong supply of services.

Various events organized in the city also draw significant crowds of visitors. For example, the 13th Motobeach brought over 40,000 people to Torres during the Carnival of 2011, particularly interested in the competition. Events, festivals, fairs, exhibitions, competitions, and cultural and artistic activities are held not only in summer, when they are more numerous, but throughout the year. Perhaps the most significant is the International Ballooning Festival, held between April and May. Considered one of the world's largest ballooning festivals, it reached its 23rd edition in 2011. The previous festival saw a record number of participants, showcasing over 40 balloons to the public. Additionally, numerous events cater more to the resident population, though they hold tourist appeal, such as the Arraial Fest Torres, an official family-oriented Festa Junina, craft exhibitions by community associations, and local celebrations of Farroupilha Week.

== Administration ==
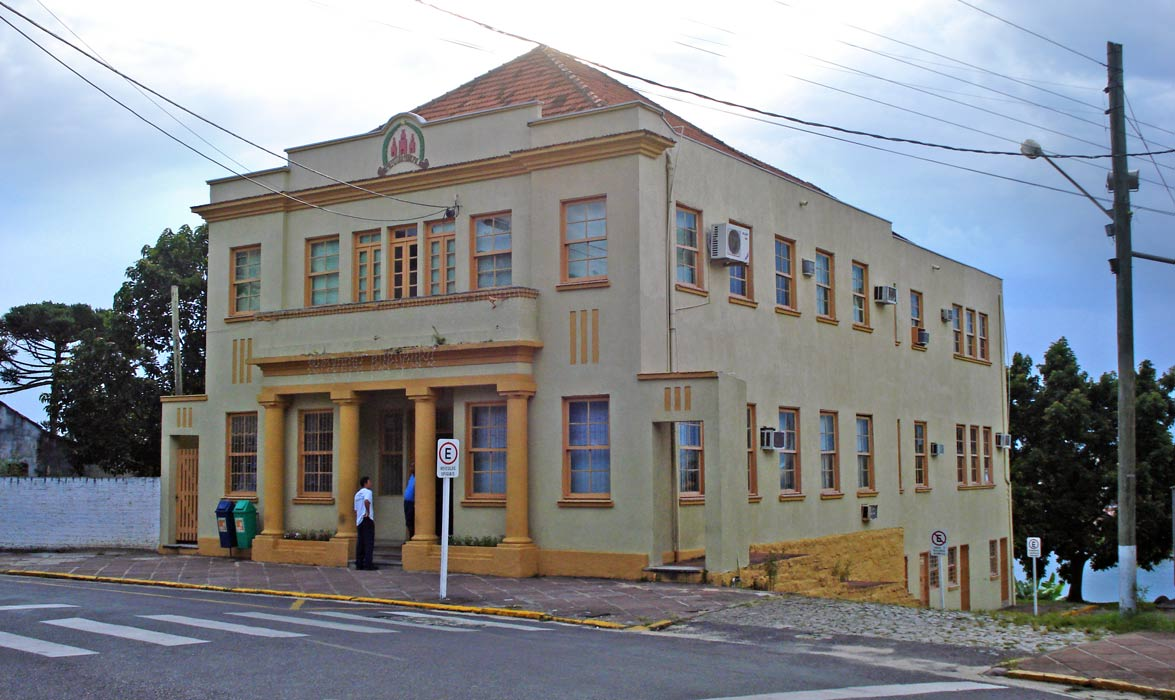
Torres City Hall

The Executive Branch is represented by Mayor Carlos Alberto Matos de Souza (PP) and Vice-Mayor Fábio Amoretti (PP), who have held their positions since January 2017. The current administration comprises nine secretariats, in addition to the Municipal Attorney General's Office. These officials coordinate a range of other administrative entities, including agencies and projects.

The local Judicial Branch is exercised through the Torres Judicial District, which serves seven municipalities. The Legislative Branch is primarily exercised by the Municipal Council, whose Board of Directors is chaired by Councilor Gisele Maria Duarte Rodrigues, from the PP, with Councilor Rogerio Evaldt Jacob, from the PDT, serving as vice-president. The XVII Legislature (2017–2020) consists of thirteen councilors, including four from the PMDB, one from the PT, three from the PP, one from the PTB, two from the PDT, one from the PRB, and one from the PROS. In 2016, the city had 28,399 registered voters.

== Infrastructure ==
=== Public policies and urban planning ===
Of the 138.25 km of streets existing in 1999, 63.7% are paved, with 60% equipped with stormwater drainage. The 1996 Demographic Census reported 8,810 permanent private households, of which 73.78% (6,500 households) were in the urban area, and the remaining 26.22% (2,310 households) in the rural area. According to the Secretariat of Coordination and Planning, in 1997, there were two housing nuclei classified as slums: one in the Riacho Doce neighborhood, with approximately 700 families, and another behind Praia da Guarita, occupied by migrants.

The city's Master Plan, established in 1995, is currently under review, but no major changes are anticipated. There is concern that incentives for construction driven by tourism may pose a threat to the environment. To mitigate this, buildings exceeding ten stories require a special permit, granted only after an environmental impact assessment. In the city center, there is no height limit for constructions, but impact analyses are still required. Developments up to three blocks from the beach are limited to a maximum height of nine meters, equivalent to three stories, and on smaller beaches, such as Praia da Cal, buildings are prohibited.

However, in an open letter published in 2000, renowned ecologist José Lutzenberger denounced the existence of a mafia formed by real estate companies and sectors of the public authorities, which, unconcerned with the urbanistic impact of their high-rise buildings, rapidly altered the city's urban character and aesthetic, causing it to lose its last elements of typicality and originality. Indeed, several high-rise buildings in the city already surpass the height of its characteristic basalt hills. Other structures also interfere with the landscape, diverting attention from the natural scenery for which the beach is famous. On Morro do Farol, tall telecommunication towers have turned the hill into a mere pedestal for themselves.

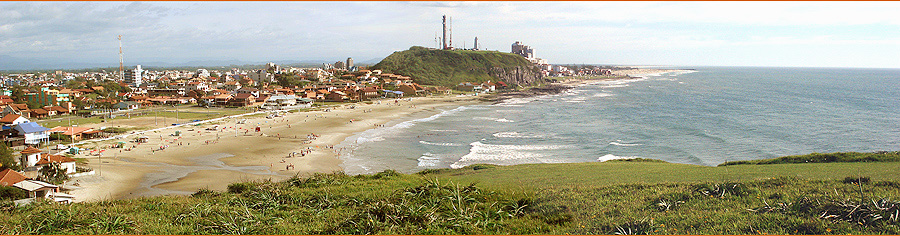
Panorama of Praia da Cal, showing the communication towers on Morro do Farol, and beyond it, the tops of several buildings in the city center and Praia Grande that exceed its height

Lutzenberger was not the only one to raise accusations, and similar reports appear with some frequency. In 2008, the AgirAzul Memória movement also spoke of corruption, adding that the proliferation of high-rise buildings harmed the beach's infrastructure, overwhelming the capacity of sewers and septic tanks. Its beaches became polluted with fecal coliforms and were classified as unfit for bathing. The Public Prosecutor's Office also investigated complaints from the Natural Environment Protection Union regarding corruption and environmental damage due to poor public policies. The judiciary ultimately issued an injunction stipulating that new construction licenses within the urban perimeter could only be granted upon presentation of a project for an autonomous collection, treatment, and final disposal system, duly licensed by the state's sanitation authority. Property speculation in the city has indeed caused considerable damage, leading to the disappearance of much of the dunes and the Atlantic Forest, threatening established reserves, and destroying many middens, important archaeological testimonies of the ancient indigenous peoples who lived in the area.

Recently, the New Torres Coastline Project was launched, a partnership between the municipality and the federal government with a budget of 3.5 million reais, aimed at revitalizing the maritime coastline with major urban planning works, covering the area from the Mampituba River mouth to Guarita Beach. The planned improvements include drainage and curb cleaning, installation of lighting and restoration of the boardwalk, implementation of a bike path, restoration of road surfaces, narrowing of the central median, enhancements to traffic signage, construction of parking areas, restoration and installation of urban furniture, and landscaping.

=== Water supply and sanitation ===
The Urban Water Supply System (SAA) is managed by the Rio Grande do Sul Sanitation Company (CORSAN). Drinking water is primarily sourced from the Itapeva Lagoon, despite its location within an environmental preservation area, with additional supply from the Sanga Água Boa. In 1999, the system had 115.1 km of network with 7,663 total water connections, of which 3,866 were metered and 3,797 unmetered, corresponding to 12,521 total service units (residential, commercial, industrial, and public), representing over 98% of the urban population served. According to CORSAN, the average physical loss of treated water in the same year was 43.30%.

Electricity is distributed by the Grupo CEEE, which has undertaken various projects to improve voltage levels and system reliability, particularly during the summer when consumption is significantly higher.

Household waste collection and treatment are managed by the municipality itself on a daily basis, serving 14,086 households in 1998. The waste is disposed of in a landfill that receives 20 tons of debris daily. During the summer season, the amount collected ranges from 60 to 70 tons per day. There is also a manual street and public space sweeping system, covering 100% of households. Hospital waste collection is outsourced and transported to Viamão, where it is incinerated.

The Sanitary Sewage System (SES), also operated by CORSAN, has 47,934 meters of sewage collection network and treats an average of 185 to 200 liters per second of sewage, reaching up to 250 l/s per day during peak season and averaging 60 l/s during the off-season. 57.42% of the urban population is served by the network, with 2,953 total connections and 7,189 total service units. CORSAN conducts environmental education and preservation programs in schools and organized communities. There are ongoing projects to expand the collection network. The stormwater drainage network is also being improved. However, in 2010, the Federal Regional Court of the 4th Region (TRF-4) accepted a complaint against the municipal mayor, João Alberto Machado Cardoso, for pollution at the Mampituba River mouth. The Federal Public Prosecutor's Office accused him of failing to implement an effective sewage treatment system in the city and of not eliminating illegal connections discharging onto the beach, which "endangers public health, harms the well-being of Torres' visitors, and causes economic losses to the city, particularly for tourism". The municipal environmental secretary defended the administration, stating that the Mampituba River receives polluted tributaries from other municipalities that do not treat their sewage, and that "the river ends here, and Torres ends up bearing the bad reputation".

=== Healthcare ===
In 2009, according to IBGE, there were eighteen healthcare facilities in the city, eight public and ten private, but only one with full hospitalization, with 88 beds; thirteen of them served the SUS. There were also ten facilities with full outpatient care, seven of which also provided dental care. The City Hall has been developing several projects to improve service in this sector, including the construction of the Psychosocial Care Center, the Health Surveillance Center, and the Family Health Unit, as well as upgrading existing health centers and conducting awareness campaigns among the population, such as for the prevention of skin cancer, the fight against dengue, and to expand vaccination coverage. During the summer, with the large influx of tourists, the City Hall maintains a medical emergency program. In the 2009-2010 summer, the program provided 8,145 services, including 3,245 medical consultations and the remainder for nursing care procedures.

== Education ==
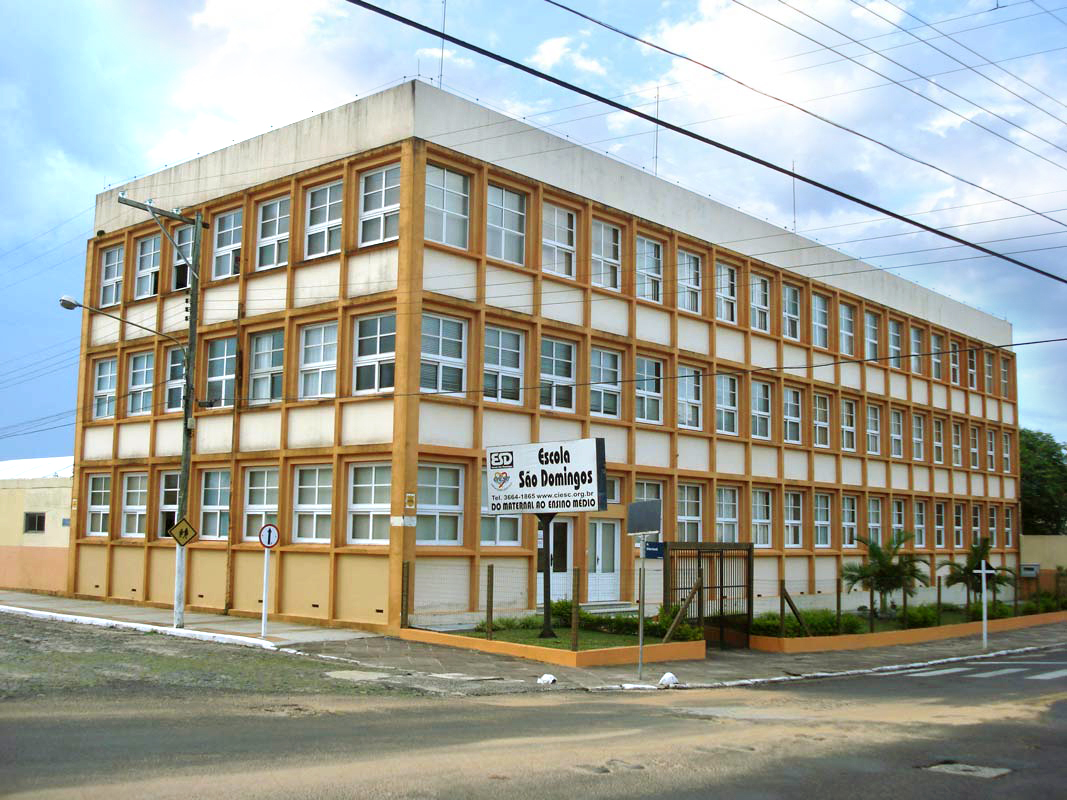
São Domingos School, a secondary education institution

Education in the municipality in 2009 was provided through fourteen preschools (five of which were private), with 627 enrollments and 36 teachers; nineteen elementary schools, with 299 teachers and 5,223 enrollments, nine of which were public; and five schools offering secondary education, with 97 teachers and 1,267 students, three of which were public. The illiteracy rate in 2000 was 7.49% for individuals over 25 years old, reflecting a reduction of approximately 50% compared to the previous decade, with a gross school attendance rate of 86.02% for the child population. Among the public authorities' initiatives in education are various projects aimed at addressing specific deficiencies. Examples include assistance with student transportation, awareness campaigns on citizenship and violence prevention, and activities to engage parents in their children's education.

There is one supplementary school offering both primary and secondary education, as well as technical courses. The National Employment System (SINE) provides various vocational courses in the city, such as housekeeping, kitchen assistance, cooking, Spanish language, waiter training, receptionist training, telemarketing, sales techniques, and computer operation. Additionally, SENAC Torres offers technical courses, including computer science, Libras, organization and planning, customer service, sales, and foreign languages.

Higher education is offered by a campus of the Lutheran University of Brazil (ULBRA), with sixteen undergraduate programs, as well as distance learning courses in Education, Law, and Management. ULBRA also fosters discussions on public and private education, for instance, by organizing and hosting the International Education Symposium and the National Education Forum, both of which have had multiple editions. It also organizes other activities to integrate with the school network, such as the Jury in Schools project, lectures, and public health initiatives.

== Public safety ==
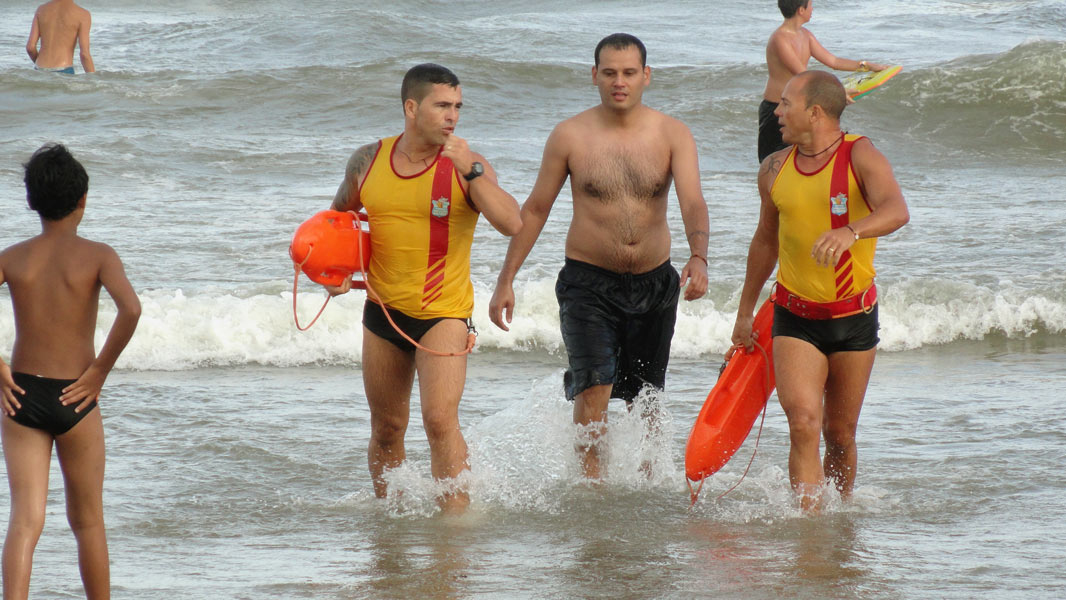
Lifeguards from the Military Brigade exiting the sea after rescuing a swimmer at Cal Beach

Public safety in Torres is maintained by several official bodies, including the Community Council for Public Safety, the Municipal Narcotics Council, the Guardianship Council for Children and Adolescents, the Police Station, and the 2nd Company of the Military Brigade. According to journalist Antônio Barañano, the situation in the city was critical until 2009, with high rates of crime and impunity, including large street protests against widespread banditry and violence, primarily attributed to drug trafficking. However, following the arrival of material and human reinforcements, particularly the appointment of Major José Alexandre Braga to lead the Brigade, the population felt safer within less than a year, and the severity of crimes committed dropped significantly. The workforce was strengthened, ostensible policing was increased, equipment and vehicles were restored, and a robust campaign of rapid-response operations against drug trafficking was organized, alongside cooperation between various official bodies and the community, resulting in over 70 arrests. However, as stated by police chief Eliana Campão Martins, the issue remains under discussion, and a more precise mapping and diagnosis of violence in Torres are needed to better manage it. She emphasized the need to introduce violence prevention activities in schools and to establish a Municipal Security Council.

The federal government also contributes through actions by the Federal Police and, in the near future, through the National Program for Security with Citizenship (Pronasci), the installation of street surveillance cameras. At the state level, through the Public Safety Department, in addition to maintaining the Military Brigade, special programs are developed for decentralizing services, raising public awareness, and combating violence and crime. The Fire Department, linked to the Brigade, also plays a significant role in public safety. In addition to its primary responsibility of firefighting, the department conducts search and rescue operations, provides pre-hospital care, and offers beach lifeguard services.

== Communications ==
There are no television stations based in Torres, but the city has relay stations for the main free-to-air TV channels in Rio Grande do Sul. The Correios operates three branches, and the city has access to fixed-line and mobile phone services, cable television, and broadband internet, both wired and Wireless. Several portals and blogs are dedicated to the city, offering chronicles, opinions, and general and tourist information. Some of these sites have a journalistic character and publish local and global news. The Municipal Government maintains an official website with an extensive section for local news. The city has three printed newspapers: the weekly A Folha, with a circulation of 700 to 1,500 copies, the biweekly Jornal da Cidade, with a circulation of 2,000 copies, and the regional weekly Jornal do Mar, which circulates from Torres to Capão da Canoa with 3,500 copies; all have online versions. The city also has radio stations, including Rádio Maristela 1380 AM, Rádio Cultural FM, Rádio Atlântico Sul FM, and SPS Rádio e Publicidade Ltda.

== Transport ==
The main land access routes are the BR-101 and the Sea Highway (RS-389). Intermunicipal bus traffic is served by the Torres Bus Station, which offers connections to most municipalities in the state and some in Santa Catarina. In 2009, the urban fleet consisted of 8,610 cars, 373 trucks, 66 tractors, 748 pickups, 24 minibuses, 2,893 motorcycles, 656 mopeds, and 56 buses. Air access is provided by the Torres Airport, though it is underutilized, as it has not been integrated into tourist or commercial flights crossing the continent, according to journalist Gastão Muri. Water transport is practiced on a small scale, limited by the absence of a port, despite proposals for its construction since the 19th century. In the past, there was significant inland navigation through a network of interconnected coastal lagoons and channels, forming a system stretching from Osório to Laguna, which, due to the poor condition of roads at the time, was the main connection to Porto Alegre. However, with the advent of other transport means in the 20th century, this network was abandoned and now primarily serves tourist purposes. The lower course of the Mampituba River remains almost entirely navigable, though its bar is unstable.

== Culture ==
=== Architecture and historical heritage ===
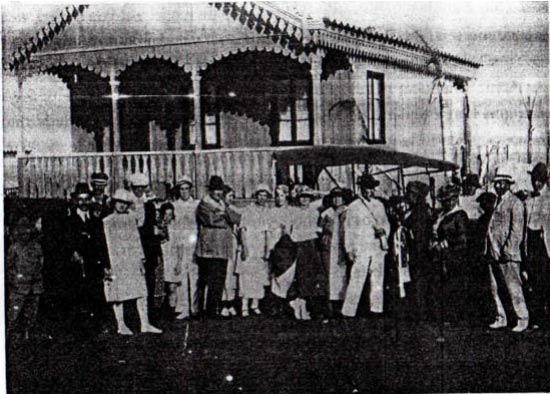
Chalet of Protásio Alves in the 1920s

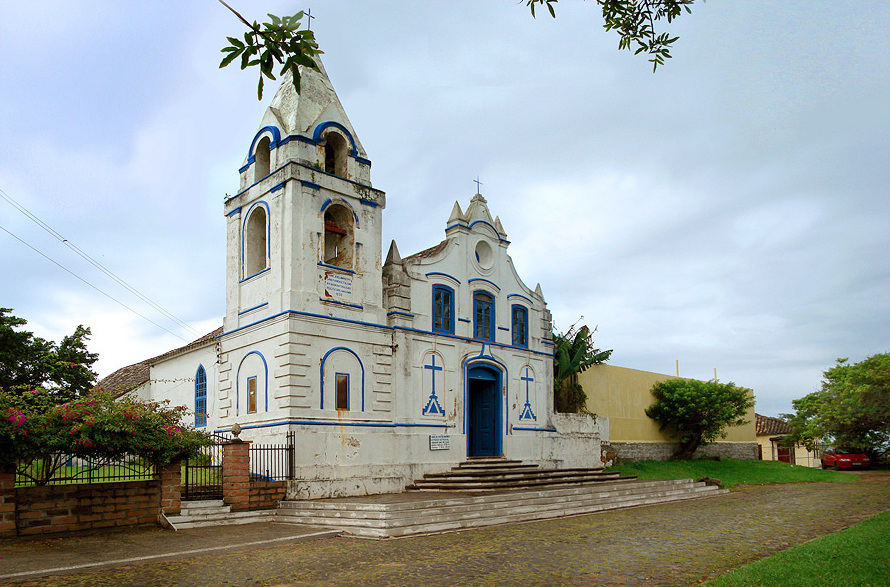
São Domingos Church before its closure

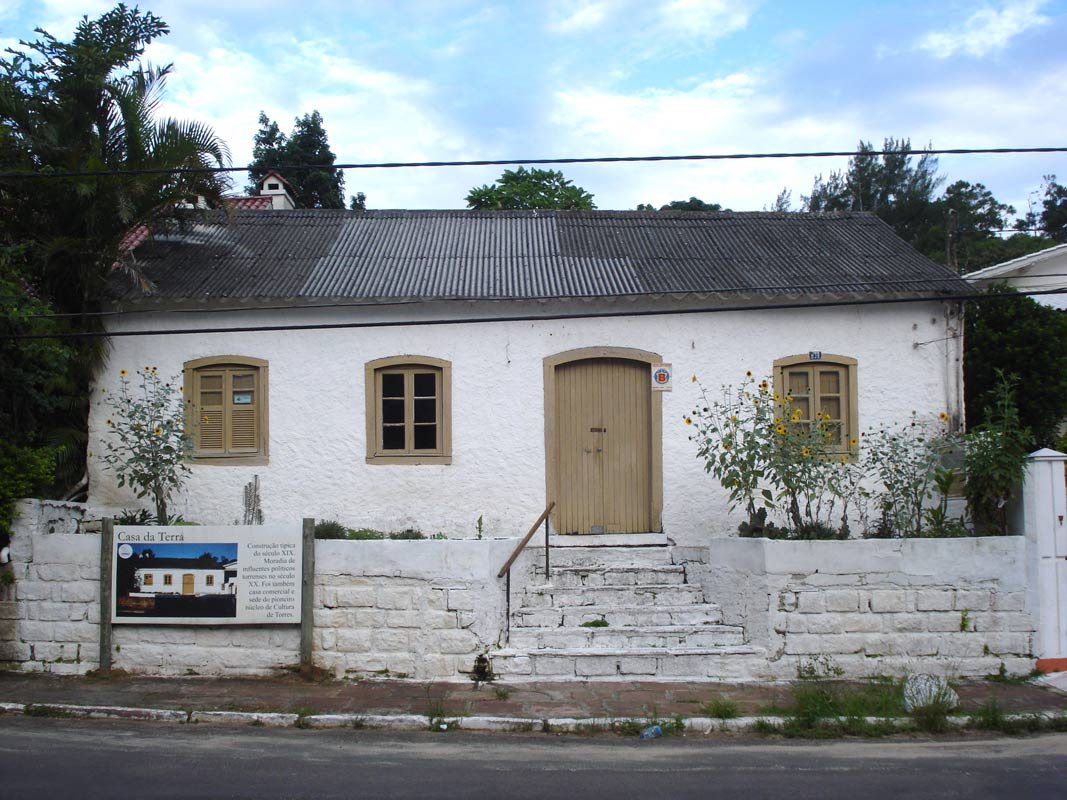
The so-called "Casa da Terra," one of the few surviving 19th-century structures, though its roof has been modified

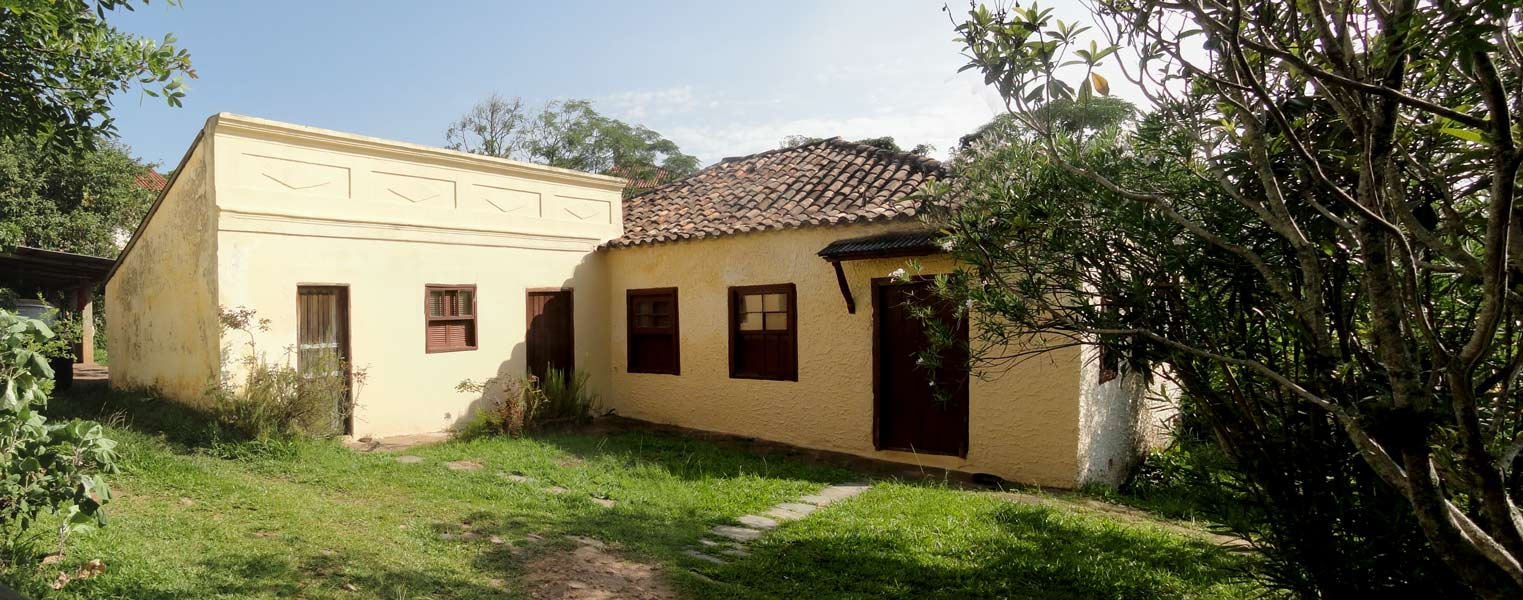
House No. 1, the oldest surviving residence in the city

Torres, one of the oldest settlements in the state, initially had very rudimentary architecture, consisting of mud or branch huts covered with straw or palm leaves. Later, examples of Brazilian colonial architecture, influenced by Portuguese Baroque, emerged, with low houses built of rammed earth or stone and covered with tiles. With the onset of tourism in the early 20th century, new buildings were constructed, including hotels and summer residences for wealthy families from Porto Alegre and the state’s interior, often made of wood with decorative elements such as lambrequins and balustrades. However, the same tourism interest, coupled with property speculation and a lack of heritage awareness, led to the near-total disappearance of these early structures in recent decades, including significant historical landmarks such as the Picoral Bathhouse, the old Farol Hotel, and the Sartori Hotel, the first to be established in the city. According to Leonardo Gedeon,

"[...] the case of our city of Torres/RS is an example that other municipalities should not follow. Gradually, our cultural assets of intangible value, local folkloric manifestations of all kinds, and material heritage, historical and archaeological monuments, have been erased from our memory and daily life in favor of economic interests alien to the local community. The mass tourism practiced and promoted through our beaches is far from valuing local cultural peculiarities."

The only large historical/artistic monument to survive in the city is the São Domingos Church, built between 1819 and 1824, the first church constructed between Laguna and Osório. It is considered by the Institute of Historical and Artistic Heritage of Rio Grande do Sul, which listed it in 1983, as the starting point of the city, which developed around it. It features a Portuguese-Brazilian colonial style, though it has undergone later interventions in different architectural styles, resulting in an eclectic ensemble where colonial Baroque still predominates. Despite its importance, its maintenance is poor, and it was closed in 2010 when part of its side wall collapsed. The restoration carried out between 2010 and 2017 surprisingly removed or altered most of the original interior elements, replacing them with modern ones, resulting in a significant loss of its authenticity and value as a historical and artistic document.

Also surviving are the "Casa da Terra," dated 1854, and a house adjacent to São Domingos Church, known as House No. 1, which hosted Emperor Dom Pedro I during his visit to the city. Additionally, there is only one museum in the city, the Três Torres Museum, which is private and linked to the Torres Beach Friends Association (SAPT). The House of Culture partially serves as a museum but lacks specific infrastructure. A natural science museum was planned for 2011 in Guarita Park, which would feature aquariums, marine animal skeletons, replicas of the region’s ecosystems, and indigenous archaeological artifacts, but the project has not yet materialized.

=== Arts ===
According to De Rose, the main form of art practiced by residents is popular music, with numerous practitioners across its various forms, from traditional to contemporary. Paulo Cezar Timm notes, "the cultural level of the city and its cultural activities still leave something to be desired, ... but the emergence of good poetry and music festivals is noteworthy." Notable in these areas are the Kikumbí Popular Culture Group, which has won awards at various state festivals, the Quinta na Praça project, featuring live music in various styles performed at the bandstand in XV de Novembro Square, prioritizing local musicians and attracting large audiences, and the Mesa de Bar group, which performs poetry recitals and original music as well as MPB, successfully touring several cities in Rio Grande do Sul.

However, the city’s tourism growth has led to a more varied and dynamic cultural and artistic life, though concentrated in the summer months. The Torres Cultural Center is the city’s most important public cultural space, hosting exhibitions and art performances. The SAPT also plays a significant cultural role, maintaining, in partnership with the Municipal Government, the Municipal Culture Center, with a 200-seat auditorium, exhibition spaces, and organizing performances, courses, and workshops. Other venues, such as the Pátio das Artes, offer multiple activities, and hotels and community associations also open their spaces for arts and crafts.

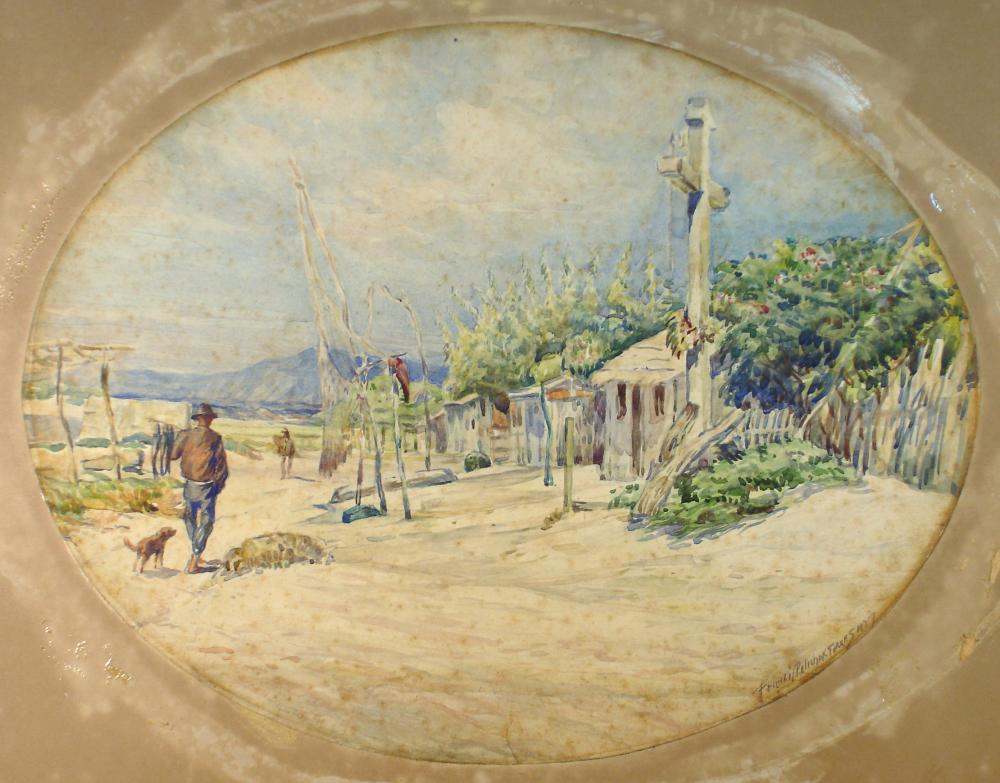
Torres Beach, painting by Francis Pelichek, 1927. Barão de Santo Ângelo Art Gallery.

Throughout the city, there are countless theater performances, music concerts, films, exhibitions, festivals, and various other shows. For example, the Torres na Cena theater festival, which, due to growing interest from groups in São Paulo and Rio de Janeiro, is gaining national prominence; the Torres Book Fair, which grows each year, provides a platform for local writers such as Hellen Rolim and Cleide Lacerda Alves and has featured prominent names such as Martha Medeiros, Moacyr Scliar, Mario Pirata, and Luis Fernando Verissimo; and various attractions promoted by SESC, featuring nationally renowned artists such as Os Paralamas do Sucesso.

Since the 19th century, the Torres landscape has inspired many external artists who have depicted it in paintings, drawings, and photographs, including notable figures such as Jean-Baptiste Debret, Herrmann Rudolf Wendroth, Francis Pelichek, Luís Maristany de Trias, and Danúbio Gonçalves. Among local artists, Nilceomar Munari stands out, having dedicated over a decade to painting the city.

=== Traditions and folklore ===
The Torres region shares various traditional customs with the entire North Coast of the state, including the typical practices of the fishing community. These practices include ancient techniques and materials that are still used today, especially by older fishermen. They artisanally produce their nets and boats, maintain traditional knowledge and interpretations about the sea, weather phenomena, and fish, and preserve practices such as making promises and blessings before fishing or using amulets. Also enduring are practices of folk medicine, cuisine, clothing, language, nicknames, legends, and stories, which were primarily consolidated in the 19th century but have ancient origins, such as tales of a buried treasure in Morro das Furnas, a curse cast by a Jesuit mistreated in the city, and the "lost spirit," a local interpretation of the will-o'-the-wisp.

In language, examples include the use of archaisms such as dous (two), pero que (because), entonce (then), alhur (elsewhere), pregunta (question), and digues (say), or idiomatic expressions like fazer boca de bagre (to remain silent), bendito fruto (a man interfering in women’s matters), mostrar as escamas (to reveal oneself), and dar a casca (to die). Folk medicine is expressed through the therapeutic or prophylactic use of holy water, herbal teas such as rue, birthwort, guinea henweed, rosemary, pennyroyal, macela, and others, as well as blessings, prayers, and incantations, such as the formula for relieving choking: biguá, biguá, sai espinha deste luga(r) que (es)tais (biguá, biguá, remove the fishbone from this place where you are), or one invoked to cure jaundice with orange leaves: Deus te salve, laranjera, que eu não vim ti visitá, vim ti pidi nove foia, pruma visita expodá (God save you, orange tree, I didn’t come to visit you, I came to ask for nine leaves for a splendid visit).

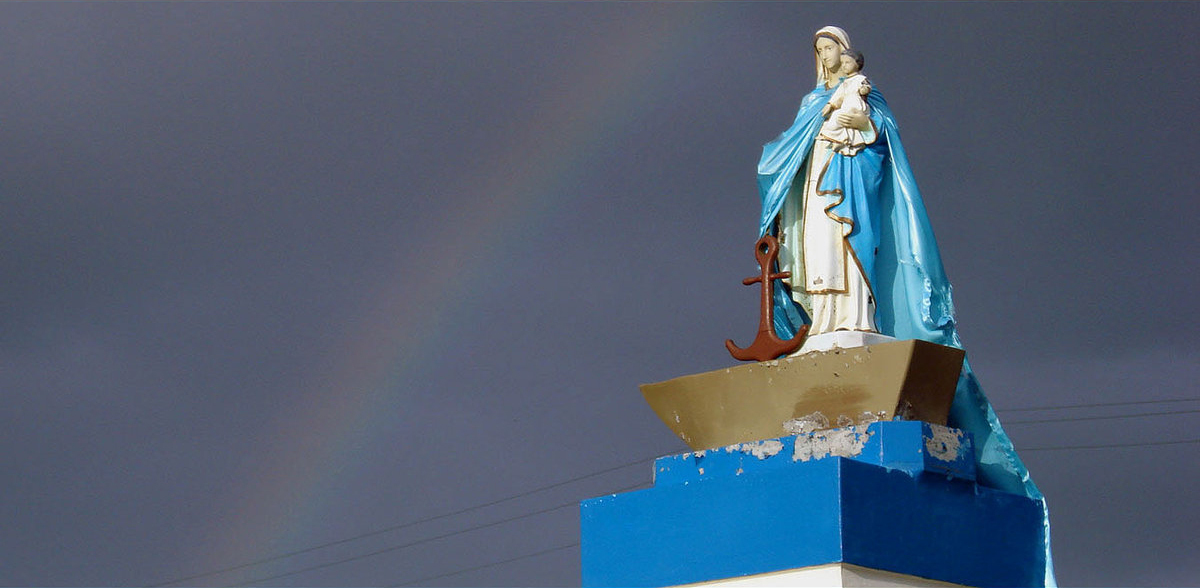
Statue of Our Lady of Navigators in the Praia da Cal square, the starting point for processions and where popular offerings are placed

Other customs are linked to rites of passage, with notable taboos surrounding birth, such as preventing the mother from stepping on fish scales, and the death of children, where they were dressed as angels and small flags were placed at their graves. Other rituals include setting up a "table of innocents" to fulfill promises, offering sweets and snacks to seven children under eight years old, and presenting ex-votos made of bread dough. Among popular festivals, the Terno de Reis, dances such as the pau-de-fita and jardineira, the Boizinho festival, June festivals, children’s singing games, dances, and religious festivals stand out, with the most attended being that of Our Lady of Navigators, a Catholic celebration held alongside Iemanjá by followers of Afro-Brazilian religions. Handicrafts are another form of traditional expression, with the production of lace, embroidery, basketry, and crafts made from shells, vines, and bamboo for bags, rugs, jewelry, home decorations, and other items. Similarly, local cuisine features traditional dishes, predominantly based on fish, shellfish, and crab, which can be grilled, fried, or boiled, typically accompanied by cassava porridge, rice, and potatoes, or prepared as moquecas and pastéis. Popular drinks include cachaça and coffee, while favored sweets include those made from sweet potato, pumpkin, and banana, as well as rapadura, pé-de-moleque, and taffy. However, many of these traditional cultural forms are rapidly disappearing due to the massification of culture driven by the tourism boom.

=== Sports ===
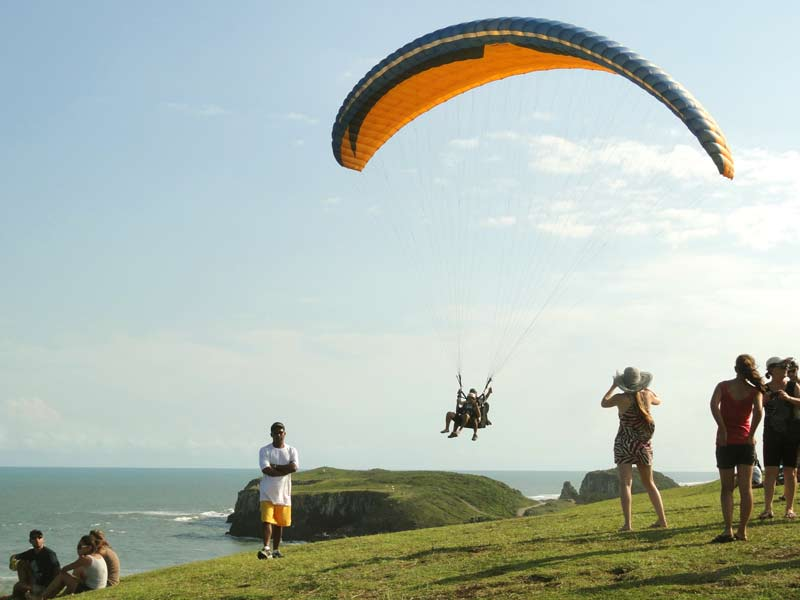
Paragliding at Farol Hill

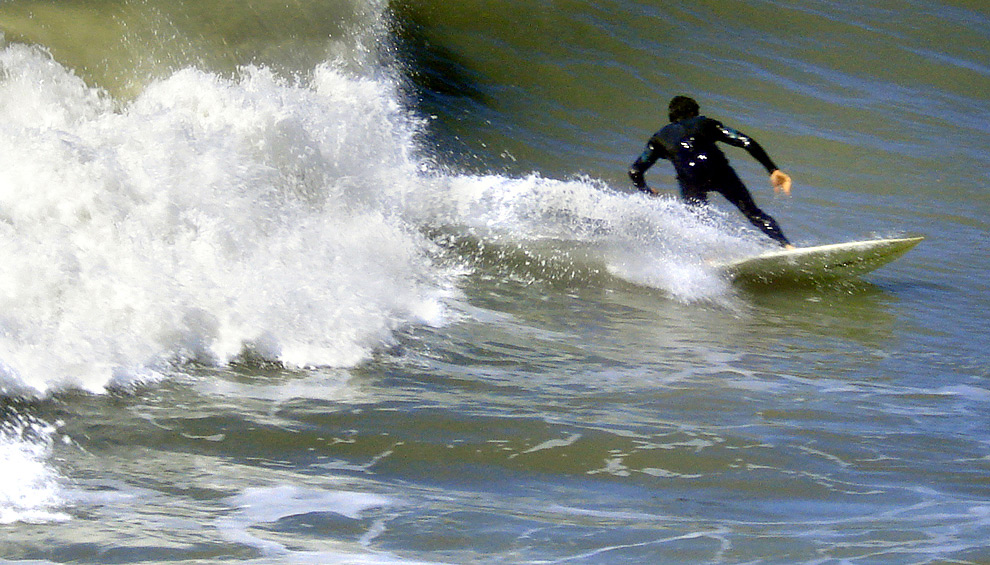
Surfer at Guarita Beach

A wide variety of sports, both outdoor and indoor, are practiced in Torres, with numerous teams, championships, and other events organized year-round, including charitable ones, particularly in the summer. The Municipal Government has a Sports Management Office responsible for maintaining infrastructure, such as the Municipal Park, and organizing sporting events. Other public and private entities also participate in the local sports scene by organizing various events, with a highlight on SESC, which hosts the popular Summer Sports Circuit, a multi-sport event that, in the 2011 edition, brought together around 10,000 athletes from 80 municipalities in Rio Grande do Sul during the qualifying stages, with finals scheduled in Torres involving approximately 3,000 athletes.

Attracted by the success of the International Ballooning Festival, practitioners of other aerial sports are becoming interested in the city, and according to the Municipal Government, Torres is on its way to becoming the state capital of aerial sports, including paragliding (with and without motors), aviation, and ultralight aviation. With its beaches, rivers, and lagoons, Torres is an ideal location for many competitive and recreational aquatic sports. One of the most popular is surfing, with events such as the Brasil Tour de Surf Profissional; the Madeirite Cup, which brings together prominent names in Gaucho surfing; the Billabong School Surf, voted the best surfing event in the state; and the Internal Surf Circuit.

In soccer, the Municipal Field Soccer Championship stands out, with teams such as S.E. São João, E.C. Mar Azul, S.E. Maracanã, E.C. Boa União, and others, playing at stadiums such as Riachão, Zelau, Evaldo Santos, Manecão, Comunitário, and Dragão Stadium. The S.E. Torrense team won the Gaucho Women’s Soccer Championship in 2010. The Municipal Futsal Championship and the Beach Soccer Championship, both organized by the Municipal Government, are also held. Several local athletes have earned awards and high rankings in competitions, including international ones, such as Claudinei Ribeiro, Sandra Couto, and Airton Gaelzer. In addition to the aforementioned, the city hosts numerous other sporting events in various disciplines, including taekwondo, rugby, skateboarding, bocce, cycling, as well as table game competitions such as Buraco for pairs and chess.

=== Holidays ===
In addition to the national holidays of January 1 (Universal Fraternity), April 21 (Tiradentes), May 1 (International Workers' Day), September 7 (Independence of Brazil), October 12 (Our Lady of Aparecida), November 2 (All Souls' Day), November 15 (Proclamation of the Republic), and December 25 (Christmas) and the state holiday of September 20 (Ragamuffin War), Torres celebrates municipal holidays on February 2 (Our Lady of Navigators), May 21 (city emancipation), August 8 (Saint Dominic, patron saint), and December 8 (Justice Day, a judicial holiday).

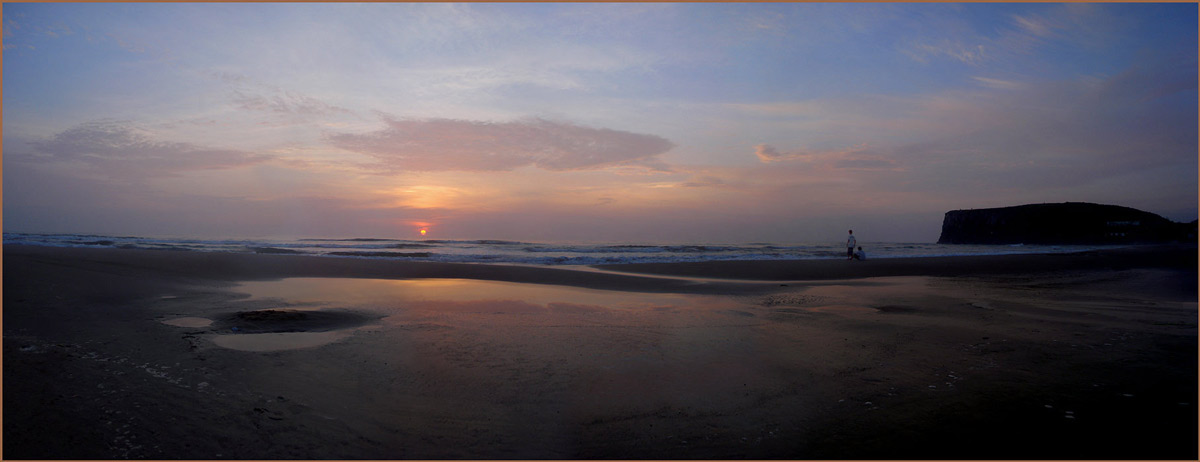
Photo of a sunrise at Praia da Cal, with Morro das Furnas on the right

== See also ==
- List of municipalities in Rio Grande do Sul
