= Thiago Rosa =

Brazilian footballer

Personal information
- Full name: Thiago Rosa da Conceição
- Date of birth: 18 March 2002 (age 24)
- Place of birth: Capão da Canoa, Brazil
- Height: 1.84 m (6 ft 0 in)
- Position: Left-back

Team information
- Current team: Maringá
- Number: 6

Youth career
- 2011: Grêmio

Senior career*
Years	Team	Apps	(Gls)
2021–2023	Grêmio	2	(0)
2021	→ Pelotas (loan)	4	(0)
2023	→ Avaí (loan)	10	(0)
2024–2025	Sampaio Corrêa	32	(3)
2025–	Maringá	26	(1)
- * Club domestic league appearances and goals as of 26 May 2021

Thiago Rosa da Conceição (born 18 March 2002), commonly known as Thiago Rosa, is a Brazilian professional footballer who plays as a left-back for Maringá.

== Club career ==
=== Grêmio ===
Born in Capão da Canoa, Brazil, Thiago Rosa joined the Grêmio's Academy at the age of 9 in 2011.

== Career statistics ==
=== Club ===
As of 26 May 2021.

Appearances and goals by club, season and competition
Club	Season	League			National Cup		Continental		Other		Total	
Club	Season	Division	Apps	Goals	Apps	Goals	Apps	Goals	Apps	Goals	Apps	Goals
Grêmio	2021	Série A	—		—		—		—		0	0
Grêmio	Total		0	0	0	0	0	0	0	0	0	0
Pelotas (loan)	2021	State	—		—		—		4 (Note: Appearance(s) in Campeonato Gaúcho.)	0	4	0
Pelotas (loan)	Total		0	0	0	0	0	0	4	0	4	0
Career total			0	0	0	0	0	0	4	0	4	0

== Honours ==
Grêmio

- Campeonato Gaúcho: 2022
- Recopa Gaúcha: 2022

Sampaio Corrêa

- Campeonato Maranhense: 2024

Maringá

- Campeonato Brasileiro Série C: 2026
