= Arroio do Sal =

Municipality of Rio Grande do Sul, Brazil

- Municipality
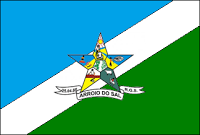
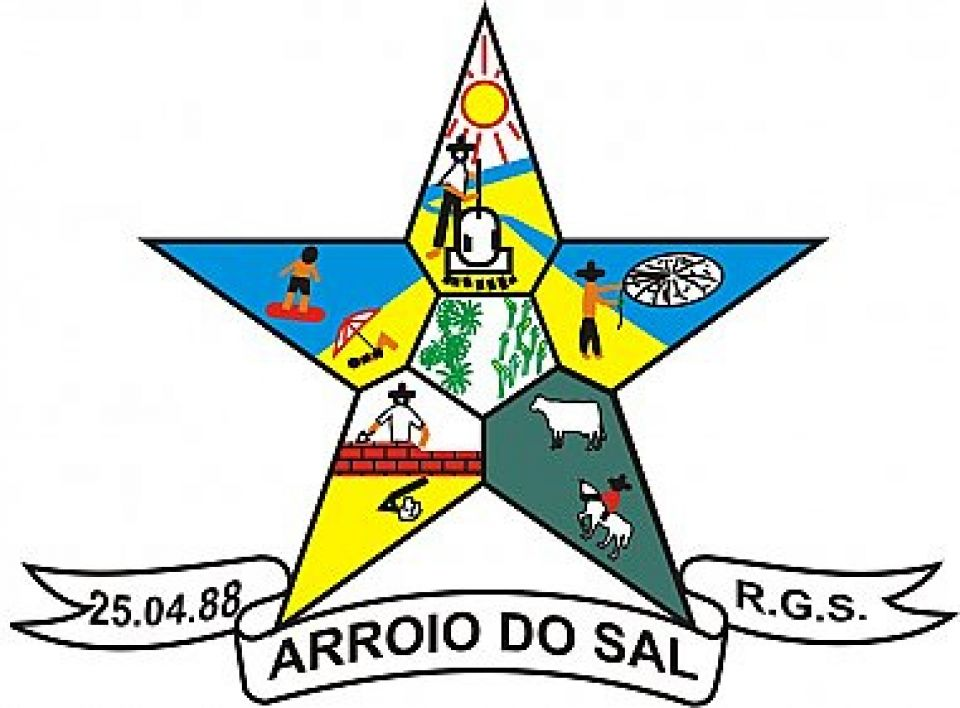
- Flag Coat of arms

- Coordinates: 29°33′03″S 49°53′20″W
- Country: Brazil
- State: Rio Grande do Sul
- Mesoregion: Metropolitana de Porto Alegre
- Microregion: Osório
- Founded: April 22, 1988

Government
  - Mayor: João Luiz da Rocha

Area
  - Total: 120.939 km^{2} (46.695 sq mi)
- Elevation: 6 m (20 ft)

Population (2020)
  - Total: 10,279
  - Density: 84.993/km^{2} (220.13/sq mi)
- Time zone: UTC−3 (BRT)
- HDI: 0.813
- GDP: R$ 54,357,000
- GDP per capita: R$8,140.00
- Website: arroiodosal.rs.gov.br

Arroio do Sal is a municipality in the state of Rio Grande do Sul, Brazil. It is about 30 km south of Torres and 30 km north of Capão da Canoa, thus in about the northern half of the state's shoreline. It is 175 km from Porto Alegre, with which it is connected via BR 101 and BR 290.

Though the population is only about 10,000, during the summer tourism season the number of people increases to about 90,000. It includes 27 km of the Atlantic coast and has about 60 beaches.

== See also ==
- List of municipalities in Rio Grande do Sul
