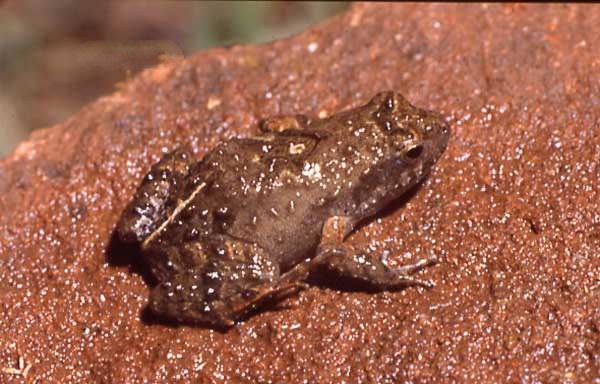

Conservation status
- Least Concern (IUCN 3.1)

Scientific classification
- Kingdom: Animalia
- Phylum: Chordata
- Class: Amphibia
- Order: Anura
- Family: Leptodactylidae
- Genus: Physalaemus
- Species: P. riograndensis

Binomial name
- Physalaemus riograndensis Milstead, 1960

= Physalaemus riograndensis =

Species of frog

Physalaemus riograndensis is a species of frog in the family Leptodactylidae. It is found in Argentina, Brazil, Paraguay, and Uruguay.

== Habitat ==
This grassland frog has been seen between 0 and 500 m (0 and 1,640 ft) above sea level. People have found it in rice paddies, gardens, and farms.

Scientists have reported the frog in protected places, including San Martin Reserve-Park, Entre Rios, El Bagual Reserve, Formosa, Parque Estadual Itapeva, and Reserva Biológica São Donato.

== Reproduction ==
The adult frog deposits the eggs in a foam nest and attaches it to vegetation.

== Threats ==
The IUCN classifies this frog as least concern of extinction.
