= Itapeva State Park =

State park in Rio Grande do Sul, Brazil

- Parque Estadual de Itapeva
- IUCN category II (national park)
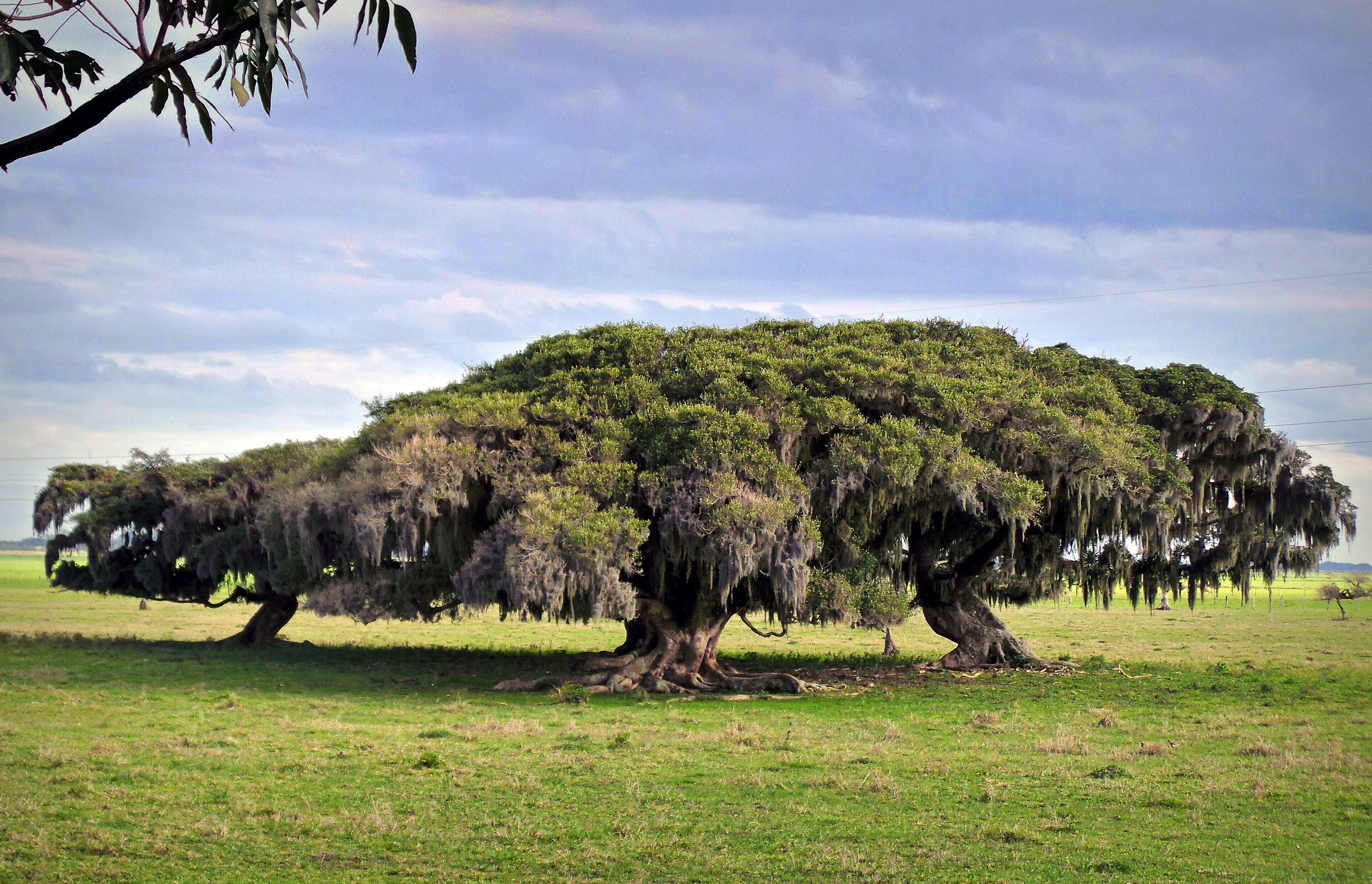
- Fig trees in the park

- Location within Brazil
- Nearest city: Torres, Rio Grande do Sul
- Coordinates: 29.360°S 49.754°W
- Area: 1,000 hectares (2,500 acres)
- Designation: State park
- Created: 2002

The Itapeva State Park (Portuguese: Parque Estadual de Itapeva) is a state park in the state of Rio Grande do Sul, Brazil.

== Location ==
The Itapeva State Park is in the municipality of Torres, Rio Grande do Sul. It is in the northeast of the state on the Atlantic coast to the north of the Itapeva Lagoon. It covers about 1,000 hectares (2,500 acres) of dunes, restinga vegetation, dry and flooded meadows, wetlands, bogs, and forest formed on damp soil. Flora include large fig trees, palniteiros, and a wide variety of orchids and bromeliads. The park has carnivorous plants of the Drosera and Utricularia species, butia (Butia catarinensis), and buriti (Trithrinax brasiliensis).

Fauna include several species of amphibians, including the rare sapinho-de-barriga vermelha (Melanophryniscus dorsalis), which is threatened with extinction in Brazil. It is also home to the skull tree iguana (Liolaemus occipitalis). Bird species include the threatened white-breasted tapaculo (Eleoscytalopus indigoticus), the white-bearded manakin (Manacus manacus) and the laughing falcon (Herpetotheres cachinnans). Mammals include robust capuchin monkeys, southern tamandua (Tamandua tetradactyla) and several species of opossum.

== History ==
There are traces of prehistoric people and of later European colonizers.

The Itapeva State Park was created by state law in 2002 to protect rare and threatened ecosystems and species of fauna and flora, and to promote scientific research, environmental education, and ecotourism. A version of the management plan was issued in October 2006. A revised version was issued in October 2010. The park is in Rio Grande do Sul's part of the Atlantic Forest Biosphere Reserve.

== Sources ==
- Duarte, Marcelo Maisonette; Bencke, Glayson Ariel (October 2006), Plano de Manejo do Parque Estadual de Itapeva (PDF), SEMA, archived from the original (PDF) on 2012-11-14
- Parque Estadual de Itapeva (in Portuguese), Instituto Curicaca
- "Parque Estadual de Itapeva", Rota Açoriana (in Portuguese)
