= Praia da Guarita =

Beach in Rio Grande do Sul, Brazil

Coordinates: 29°21′5.15″S 49°43′51.86″W

Guarita Beach is a Brazilian beach in the state of Rio Grande do Sul. It is a public resort that stretches along 23 kilometers on the coast the city of Torres. It borders with Santa Catarina and can be accessed through two roads, the BR-101 and the RS-389, which is the last road before reaching the sea. The city of Torres is 197 km far from Porto Alegre and 280 km far from Florianópolis. The beach is located between the "towers" (in fact volcanic plugs) the city is named after, and is flanked by the Morro das Furnas to the north and the Morro da Guarita to the south. It includes an environmentally-protected area, the Parque da Guarita.

== Geography ==
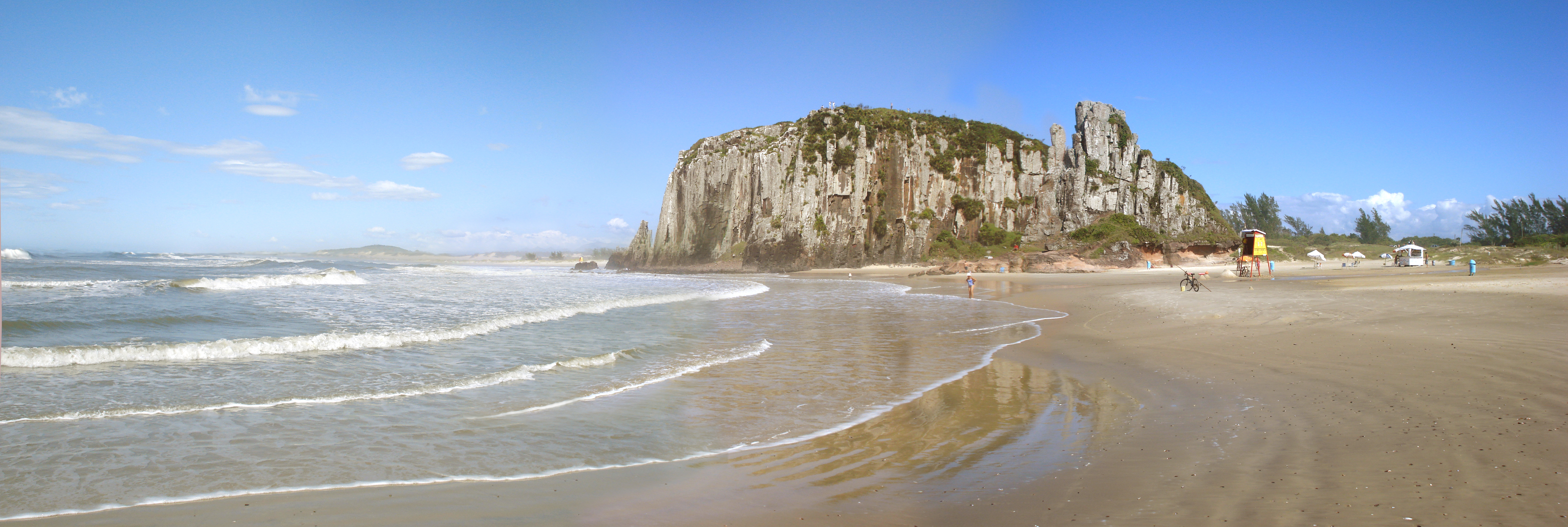
The beach of Guarita with the two towers that lead to name to city to the right.
