= Passo de Torres =

Coordinates: 29.335°S 49.7228°W

- Municipality
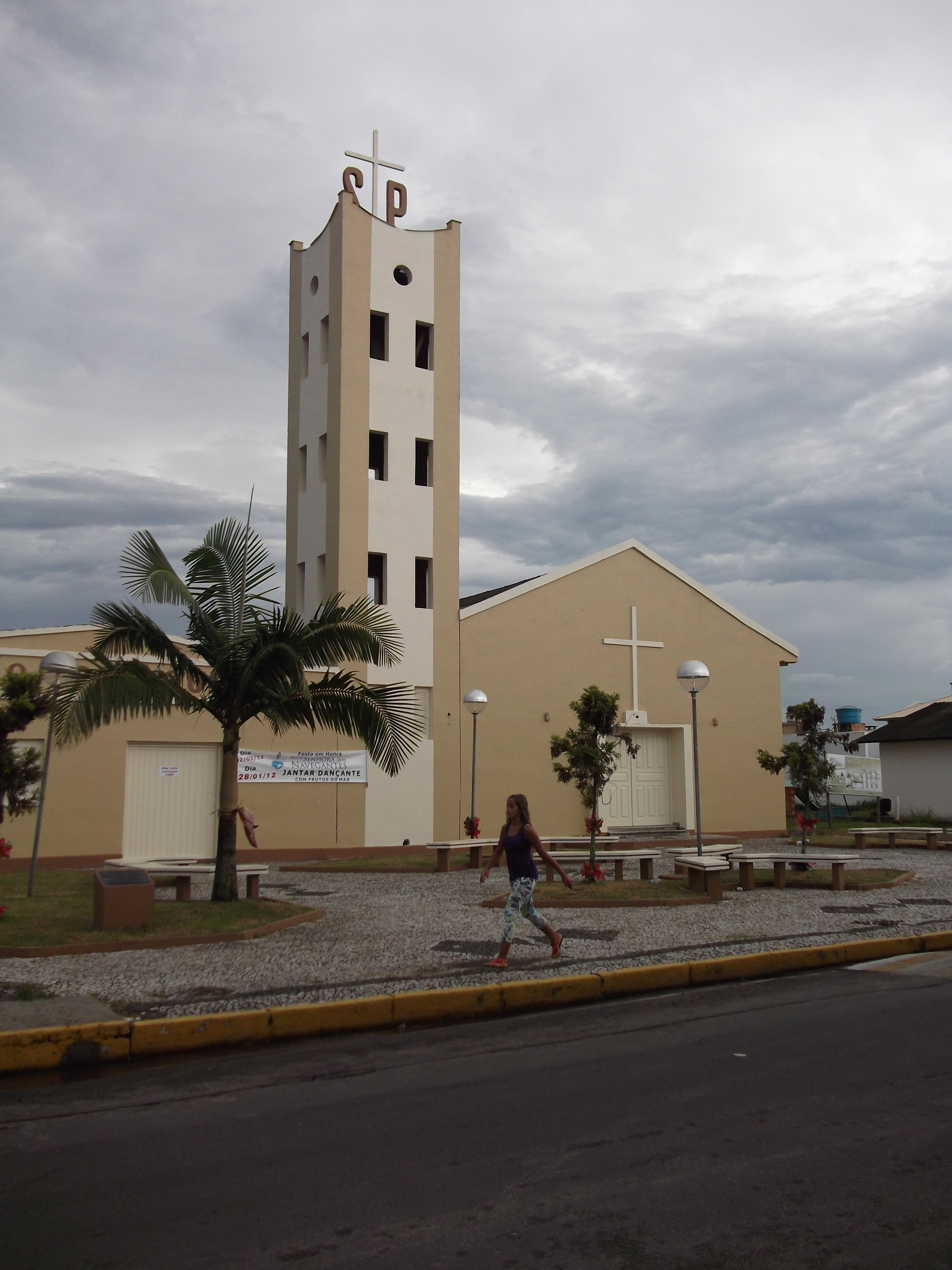

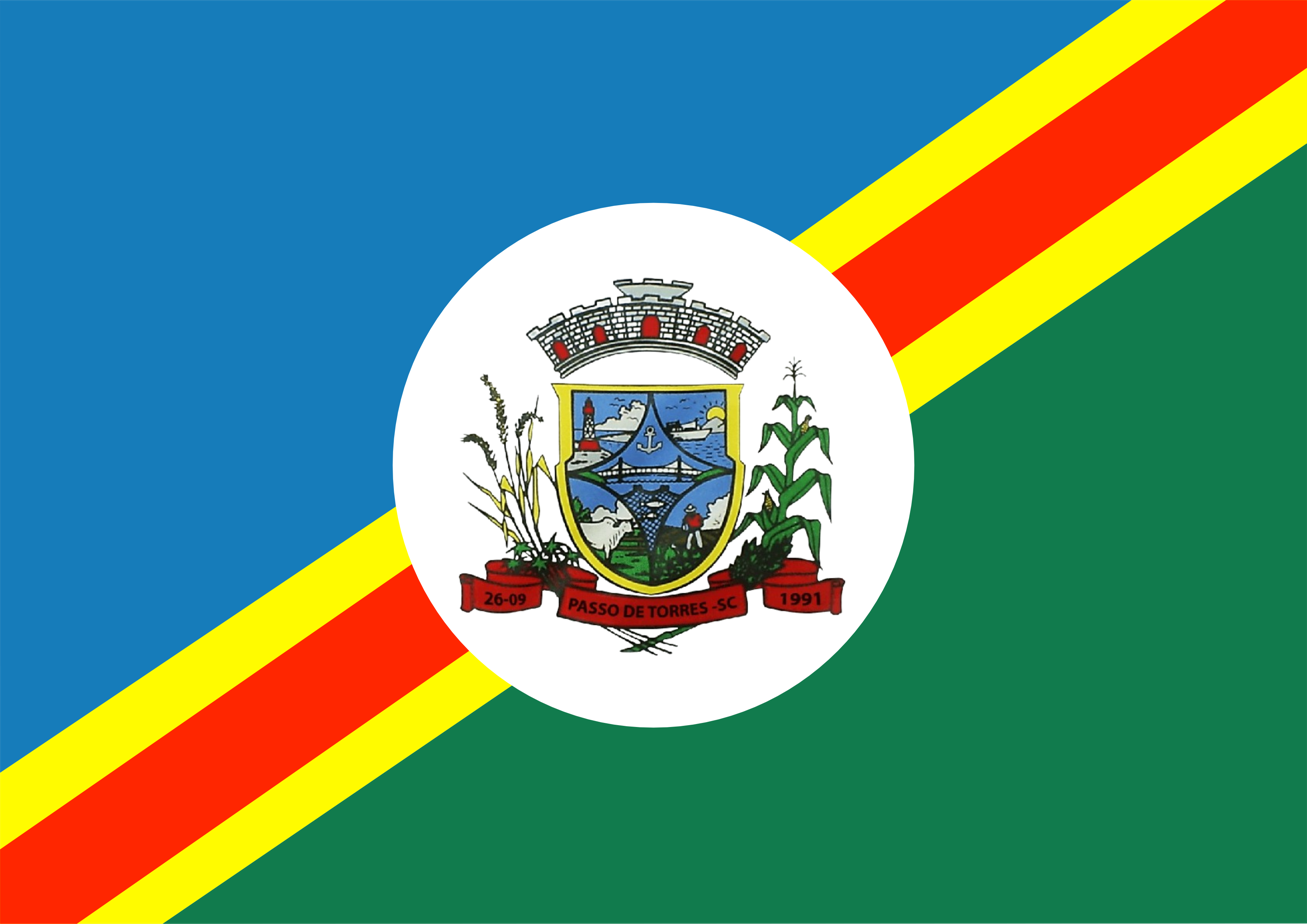
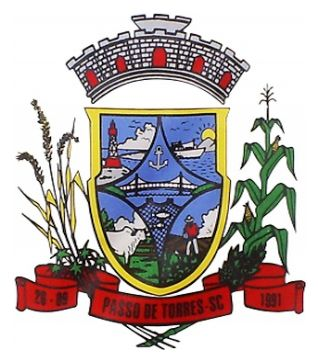
- Flag Coat of arms
- Interactive map of Passo de Torres
- Country: Brazil
- Region: South
- State: Santa Catarina
- Mesoregion: Sul Catarinense

Population (2020)
  - Total: 9,048
- Time zone: UTC−3 (BRT)

Passo de Torres is a municipality in the state of Santa Catarina in the South region of Brazil.

== See also ==
- List of municipalities in Santa Catarina
