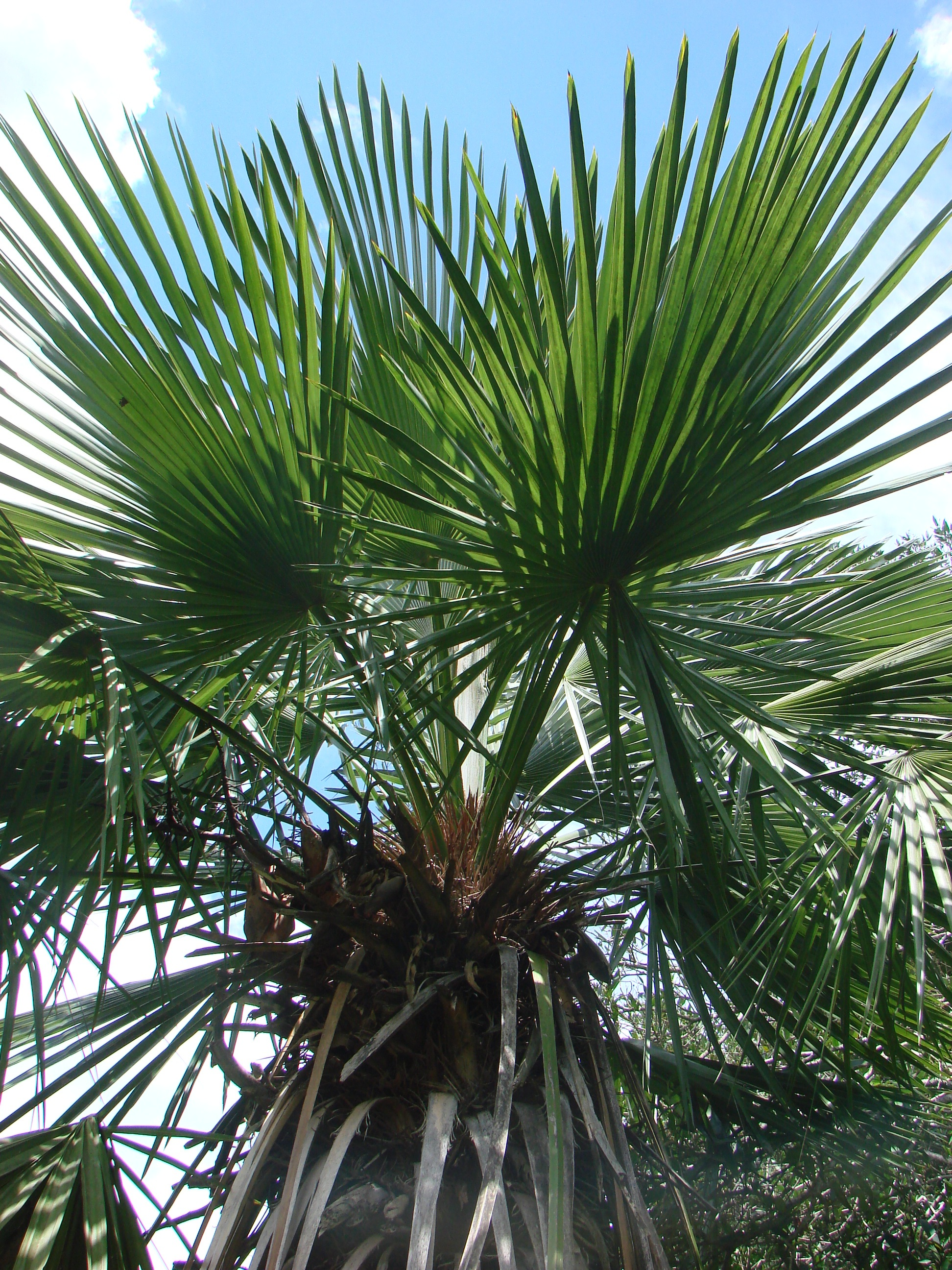

Conservation status
- Data Deficient (IUCN 2.3)

Scientific classification
- Kingdom: Plantae
- Clade: Tracheophytes
- Clade: Angiosperms
- Clade: Monocots
- Clade: Commelinids
- Order: Arecales
- Family: Arecaceae
- Genus: Trithrinax
- Species: T. brasiliensis

Binomial name
- Trithrinax brasiliensis Mart.

= Trithrinax brasiliensis =

Species of palm

Trithrinax brasiliensis is a species of flowering plant in the family Arecaceae. It is known as carandá, burití or leque. It is considered a rare and endemic species in southern Brazil. It occurs in Argentina, southern Brazil, and eastern Bolivia, where it is popularly known to Spanish speakers as saó or saocito and to speakers of Chiquitano as baixhíxh. Nowadays it is considered a threatened species belonging to the category "In Danger" in the List of Threatened species of Rio Grande do Sul state, southern Brazil.
