= Capão da Canoa =

Municipality of Rio Grande do Sul, Brazil

- Municipality
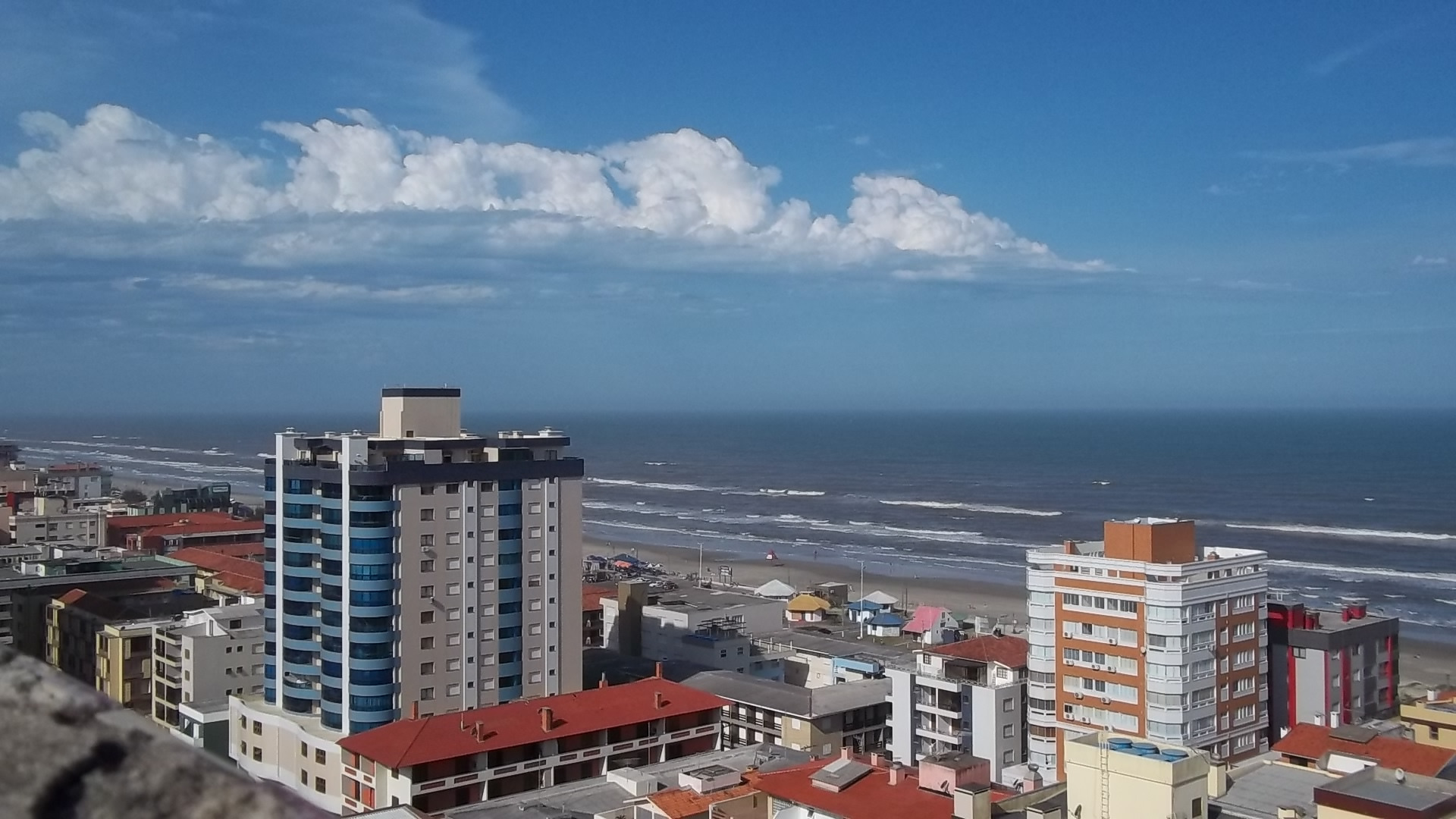

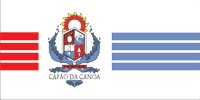
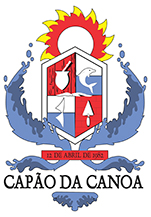
- Flag Coat of arms

- Location within Rio Grande do Sul

- Location in Brazil
- Coordinates: 29°46′S 50°01′W
- Country: Brazil
- State: Rio Grande do Sul

Population (2020)
  - Total: 54,051
- Time zone: UTC−3 (BRT)

Capão da Canoa is a municipality in the state of Rio Grande do Sul, Brazil. With miles of beaches, Capão da Canoa is a popular beach resort for residents of nearby Porto Alegre.

== History ==
A small plane crashed into a closed restaurant in the municipality on 3 April 2026, killing all four people aboard the plane.

== See also ==
- List of municipalities in Rio Grande do Sul
