= Coast of Rio Grande do Sul =

The coast of Rio Grande do Sul corresponds to the coastal strip located in Rio Grande do Sul. The coast is divided into two regions: north and south.

In the southern coast of Rio Grande do Sul lies the world's longest beach, Cassino Beach, which stretches for about 254 km.

Northern Coast

Southern Coast

== Most populous cities ==
2017 estimate

Most populated cities on the coast of Rio Grande do Sul
Position	City	Microregion	Mesoregion	Population	Rio Grande Capão da Canoa Tramandaí Osório
1	Rio Grande	Litoral Lagunar	Sudeste	209 378	Rio Grande Capão da Canoa Tramandaí Osório
2	Capão da Canoa	Osório	Metropolitana	48 401	Rio Grande Capão da Canoa Tramandaí Osório
3	Tramandaí	Osório	Metropolitana	47 521	Rio Grande Capão da Canoa Tramandaí Osório
4	Osório	Osório	Metropolitana	44 468	Rio Grande Capão da Canoa Tramandaí Osório
5	Torres	Osório	Metropolitana	37 564	Rio Grande Capão da Canoa Tramandaí Osório
6	20px Santa Vitória do Palmar	Litoral Lagunar	Sudeste	31 274	Rio Grande Capão da Canoa Tramandaí Osório
7	São José do Norte	Litoral Lagunar	Sudeste	27 206	Rio Grande Capão da Canoa Tramandaí Osório
8	Imbé	Osório	Metropolitana	20 578	Rio Grande Capão da Canoa Tramandaí Osório
9	Cidreira	Osório	Metropolitana	14 710	Rio Grande Capão da Canoa Tramandaí Osório
10	Xangri-lá	Osório	Metropolitana	14 650	Rio Grande Capão da Canoa Tramandaí Osório
11	Mostardas	Osório	Metropolitana	12 794	Rio Grande Capão da Canoa Tramandaí Osório
12	Balneário Pinhal	Osório	Metropolitana	12 671	Rio Grande Capão da Canoa Tramandaí Osório
13	Palmares do Sul	Osório	Metropolitana	11 449	Rio Grande Capão da Canoa Tramandaí Osório
14	Arroio do Sal	Osório	Metropolitana	9 050	Rio Grande Capão da Canoa Tramandaí Osório

== See also ==
- Rio Grande do Sul
- Physiography of Rio Grande do Sul
