= São Gonçalo Channel =

Channel in Rio Grande do Sul, Brazil

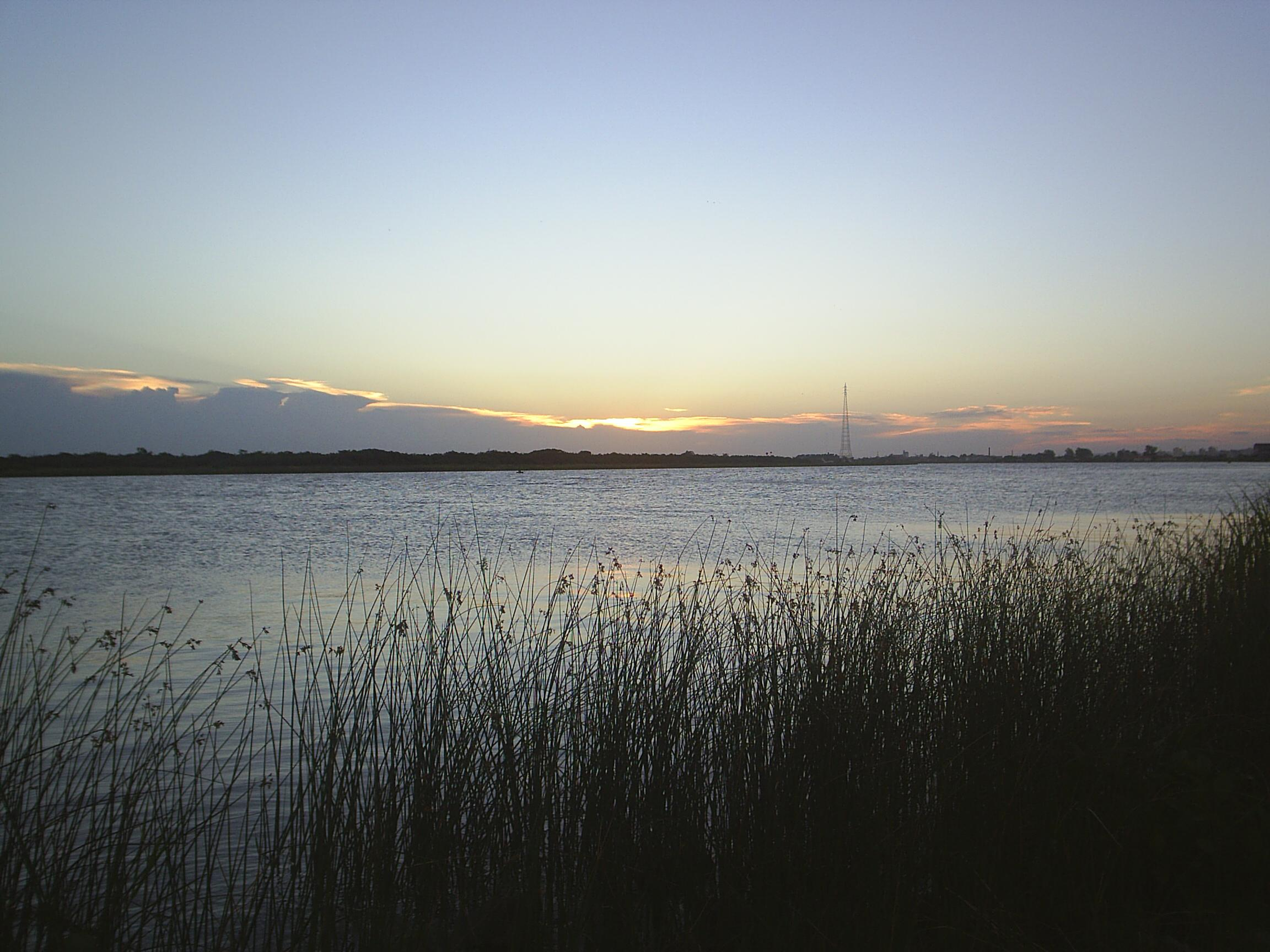
- On the banks of the São Gonçalo Channel

- Location within Brazil

Location
- Country: Uruguay, Brazil

Physical characteristics
- Source
  - location: Lagoa Mirim
  - coordinates: 32°8′44.1348″S 52°37′22.3356″W
  - elevation: 1 m (3 ft 3 in)
- Mouth
  - location: Lagoa dos Patos
  - coordinates: 31°47′22.344″S 52°13′17.4684″W
  - elevation: 0 m (0 ft)
- Length: 76.6 km (47.6 mi)
- Basin size: 56,212.2 km^{2} (21,703.7 mi^{2}) to 62,250 km^{2} (24,030 mi^{2})
- Width
  - average: 200 m (660 ft) to 300 m (980 ft)
- Depth
  - average: 10 m (33 ft)
- Discharge
  - location: Lagoa dos Patos (near mouth)
  - average: (Period: 1970-2000)1,186.5 m^{3}/s (41,900 cu ft/s)
  - minimum: 300 m^{3}/s (11,000 cu ft/s)
  - maximum: 2,250 m^{3}/s (79,000 cu ft/s) to 3,000 m^{3}/s (110,000 cu ft/s)
- Discharge
  - location: Pelotas (15 km upstream of mouth; Basin size: 55,296.3 km^{2} (21,350.0 sq mi)
  - average: (Period: 1970-2000)1,154.2 m^{3}/s (40,760 cu ft/s)
- Discharge
  - location: Lagoa Mirim (76.6 km upstream of mouth; Basin size: 47,854.5 km^{2} (18,476.7 sq mi)
  - average: (Period: 1970-2000)936.7 m^{3}/s (33,080 cu ft/s)

Basin features
- Tributaries
  - left: Arroio Pelotas, Canal Santa Barbara, Arroio Fragata, Arroio Teodósia, Arroio do Pavão, Piratini

The São Gonçalo Channel (Portuguese pronunciation: [sɐ̃w ɡõˈsalu]) is a navigable channel connecting two large coastal lagoons, Lagoa Mirim and Lagoa dos Patos, in the state of Rio Grande do Sul in southern Brazil. At its eastern end, it separates the municipalities of Rio Grande to the south from Pelotas to the north.

== Course ==
The Mirim-São Gonçalo basin covers an area of about 62,250 km^{2} (24,030 mi^{2}), of which 47% are in Brazil and 53% in Uruguay. Its main source of water, the Lagoa Mirim, is located in the coastal plain, with an average width of 20 km and an area of 3,750 km^{2} (1,450 mi^{2}), of which 2,750 km² are in Brazilian territory and 1,000 km² in Uruguayan territory.

The two systems are connected by a 76.6 km (47.6 mi) natural channel called São Gonçalo, which drains from Lagoa Mirim to Lagoa dos Patos. However, in times of drought, this flow is reversed and the salt water flows from Lagoa dos Patos through the São Gonçalo canal to Lagoa Mirim. The São Gonçalo Channel is located in the west-southern part of the Lagoa dos Patos system. The natural flow regime of the canal is complex, with periodic reversals in the direction of flow, which is why the canal is called the Gonçalo Canal. The average discharge is 700 m^{3}/s (25,000 cu ft/s) to 1,200 m^{3}/s (42,000 cu ft/s) and the flow velocity is 0.6 m/s. The maximum freshwater discharge reaches 3,000 m^{3}/s (110,000 cu ft/s) during floods, while the discharge is zero during long dry seasons, when the flow is generally directed towards the Lagoa Mirim. This natural channel has a sinuous course, varying in width from 200 m (660 ft) to 300 m (980 ft) and in depth up to 10 m (33 ft).

The region is part of the geomorphological provinces of the Coastal Plain and the Uruguayo-South-Rio-Grande Shield, and in the Brazilian part of the region are Aceguá, Arroio do Padre, Arroio Grande, Bagé, Candiota, Canguçu, Capão do Leãu, Pedro Osório, Pelotas, Pinheiro Machado, Piratini, Rio Grande, Santa Vitória do Palmar and Turuçu.

== Ecology ==
The lake and the wetlands around it form one of the main hydrographic basins of Rio Grande do Sul, which contains a wide variety of flora and fauna and, together with Lagoa dos Patos, forms the largest lagoon complex in South America. The Lagoa Mirim and its surrounding wetland complex form one of the main transboundary river basins in South America, which is of great ecological and economic importance. The main uses of the water are irrigation and human consumption. Two important environmental reserves, the Taim Ecological Station in Brazil and the Humedales del Este in Uruguay, are located on the shores of the basin. The Taim Ecological Station is a federal nature conservation unit of integrated protection and aims to protect the environment. Known worldwide as one of the most important nature reserves, it preserves marshes, lakes, fields, dunes and forests, and is home to a wide variety of plant and animal species.

The Humedales Del Este eastern wetlands in Uruguay, have been included in the list of the Convention on Wetlands of International Importance - Ramsar Convention, which is made up of an ecosystem of about 560,000 hectares, including 10 protected biosphere reserves, national parks (Bañados de San Miguasn, Laguna de Josrón - Isla de Lobos, Cerro Largo); Protected landscapes (Cerro Catedral - Sierra de Sosa, Asperezas de Polanco, Sierra Del Tigre, Quebrada de los Cuervos); Protected areas with managed resources (Laguna Merín and India Muerta).

== Sluice system ==
The lock separates the São Gonçalo Canal from the Lagoa dos Patos at 15 km and the Lagoa Mirim at 61 km. The sluice dam was built in 1977 to prevent the inflow of salt water into the Lagoa Mirim, as a result of the development of the two countries between Uruguay and Brazil. This navigation channel has two leveling sluice gates 17 m high and 8 m wide. The system of operation of the sluice depends on the fluviometric level of the Lagoa Mirim: when the average level of the Lagoa Mirim is close to 1 m below sea level, the sluice starts to regulate the flow between the São Gonçalo channel and the Lagoa dos Patos. The water level in the Lagoa Mirim is controlled during this period by partial or complete closure of the lock gates and by reducing the opening time of the navigation lock. During the remaining time the locks will remain partially open. In summer, the lock channel is opened four times a day at fixed times to allow the passage of vessels.

== Tributaries ==
Major tributaries of the Mirim-São Gonçalo basin:

River	Mouth coordinates	Length (km)	Basin size (km²)	Average discharge (m^{3}/s)
São Gonçalo Channel
Arroio Pelotas	31°46′24.1176″S 52°16′51.3516″W		901.5	23.5
Arroio Fragata	31°48′3.2292″S 52°22′21.0468″W		219.7	5.4
Arroio Teodósio	31°50′41.0964″S 52°23′20.0832″W		285.6	6.9
Arroio Pavão	31°58′7.9536″S 52°25′4.1916″W		178.2	4.3
Piratini	32°0′56.5416″S 52°25′10.1604″W	120	5,590.1	141.9
Lagoa Mirim
Arroio Moreira	32°8′29.1156″S 52°41′5.3844″W		314.2	7.5
Arroio Parapó	32°10′16.7196″S 52°43′31.5372″W		280.1	6.6
Arroio Chasqueiro	32°16′4.6524″S 52°47′14.9928″W		398	8.9
Arroio Grande	32°20′55.3704″S 52°47′37.1076″W		1,153.4	23.3
Arroio Bretanha	32°29′18.1248″S 52°58′9.534″W		488.1	10.6
Sanga do Meio	32°38′30.552″S 53°5′12.0012″W		407.5	8.7
Jaguarão	32°39′11.736″S 53°10′56.064″W	270	7,541.2	147.3
Tacuarí	32°46′13.4472″S 53°18′31.7412″W	230	5,288.5	101.5
Cebollatí	33°9′3.2616″S 53°37′32.3688″W	235	17,513.5	337
San Luis	33°31′33.3696″S 53°32′37.7916″W		2,949.8	54.1
Arroio San Miguel	33°36′9.6264″S 53°31′56.856″W		2,236.6	38.8
Arroio Del Rey	33°4′35.9004″S 53°14′28.446″W		1,183.4	19.7
