= Cristal, Rio Grande do Sul =

Municipality of Rio Grande do Sul, Brazil

Cristal
- Municipality
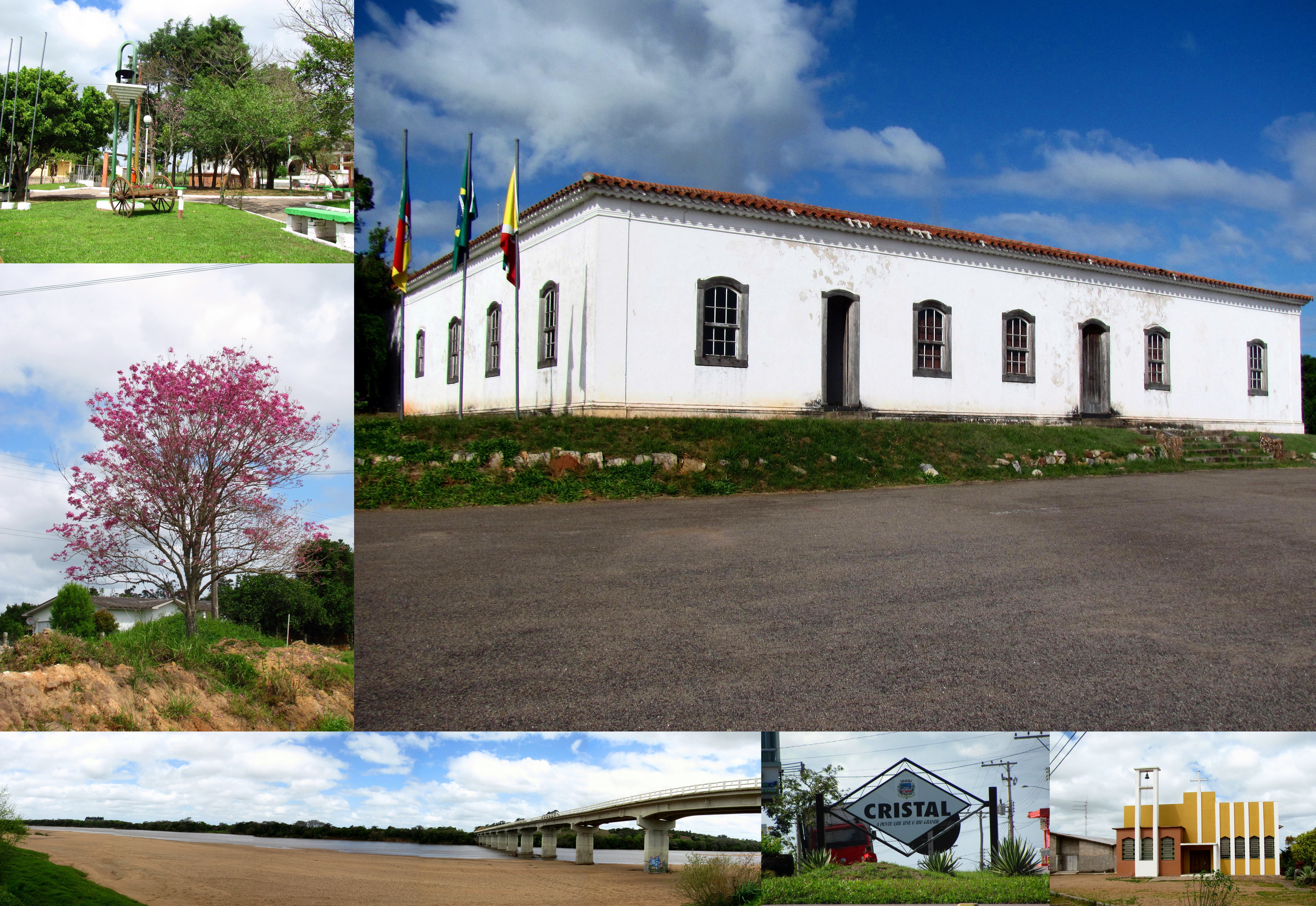

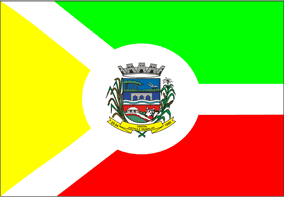
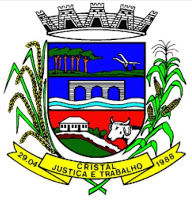
- Flag Coat of arms

- Location within Rio Grande do Sul

- Location in Brazil
- Coordinates: 31°0′8″S 52°2′48″W
- Country: Brazil
- State: Rio Grande do Sul
- Mesoregion: Sudeste Rio-Grandense
- Microregion: Pelotas
- Founded: April 29, 1988

Area
  - Total: 681.63 km^{2} (263.18 sq mi)

Population (2020)
  - Total: 8,067
  - Density: 11.83/km^{2} (30.65/sq mi)
- Time zone: UTC−3 (BRT)
- Website: http://www.cristal.rs.gov.br/

Cristal (Portuguese pronunciation: [kɾisˈtaw], "crystal") is a Brazilian municipality in the southeastern part of the state of Rio Grande do Sul. The population is 8,067 (2020 est.) in an area of 681.63 km^{2}. The Camaquã River flows through the municipality.

== Bounding municipalities ==
- Camaquã, north and east
- São Lourenço do Sul, south

== See also ==
- List of municipalities in Rio Grande do Sul
