= Ulbra TV =

- Canoas-Porto Alegre, Rio Grande do Sul; Brazil
- Channels: Digital: 50 (UHF); Virtual: 48
- Branding: Ulbra TV

Programming
- Affiliations: TV Cultura

Ownership
- Owner: Lutheran University of Brazil; (Associação Educacional Luterana do Brasil - AELBRA)
- Sister stations: Mix FM Porto Alegre

History
- First air date: November 26, 2004
- Former call signs: ZYB 637 (2004-2018)
- Former names: MultiRS (2025)
- Former channel numbers: Analog: 48 (UHF, 2004–2018)
- Former affiliations: SescTV; Independent (2005-2015)

Technical information
- Licensing authority: ANATEL
- ERP: 1.6 kW
- Transmitter coordinates: 30°4′53.3″S 51°10′0″W

Links
- Public license information: Profile

Ulbra TV (channel 48) is a Brazilian university television station based in Canoas, in the state of Rio Grande do Sul, which operates on virtual channel 48.1, granted to the capital Porto Alegre, relaying TV Cultura. Maintained by the Lutheran University of Brazil (Ulbra), it was opened in 2004 under the name Ulbra TV, broadcasting programming aimed at young audiences in partnership with STV, having quickly adopted a more generalist and educational schedule. Its studios are in the Ulbratech technology park building, on the university campus in Canoas, and its transmitting antenna is at the top of Morro da Police, in Porto Alegre.

== History ==
The Lutheran University of Brazil received, in January 2002, the license for UHF channel 48 in Porto Alegre, formerly a relay of Rede Manchete, to operate the future Ulbra TV, becoming the first university in Brazil to obtain an over-the-air television license. With a 100 km radius that reached Serra Gaúcha and the state's north coast, the station opened on November 26, 2004, airing an experimental phase consisting programming aimed at young audiences, of which part was given to 26 local productions and the rest was filled with content from STV, a cable and satellite channel based in São Paulo managed at the time by SESC and SENAC. The official inauguration of Ulbra TV took place on August 16, 2005, at the Museum of Science and Technology on the Ulbra campus in Canoas with the presence of its deans and directors. The station was headquartered at Ulbra Saúde's building, in downtown Porto Alegre.

In October, Ulbra TV sealed a co-operation agreement with TVE RS for the sharing of programs and reports, studio, recording resources and relay towers. In 2006, the station launched a new line-up, which included slots airing old foreign films and series, Pop Rock on TV, a program produced in partnership with its sister university Pop Rock FM that presented its behind-the-scenes, video clips and events, and the youth series POA RS; in 2007, the production was renamed Vidanormal and transferred to TVCOM. Still in 2006, the cities of Jaguarão, Santa Maria and Torres were the first to relay the station in the state's inland area, which coincided with its uplinking to the PAS-1R satellite, with coverage across Latin America. Within two years, the station also installed relays in Santa Catarina and Paraná.

In 2007, Ulbra TV was transferred, alpngside Pop Rock FM, to a new two-floor building adjacent to Ulbra Saúde and unveiled a new schedule, with a more generalist profile featuring programs aimed at different audiences and animated series, as well as airing soccer matches from Sport Club Ulbra playing for the third division of Campeonato Brasileiro. The station often aired foreign movies and TV series (such as El Chavo del Ocho, The Simpsons and anime) through illegal methods, usually coming from official DVD releases of the time. This practice was not exclusive to Ulbra TV, as other local community television stations used piracy to air these series. Dragon Ball Z, an anime whose legal rights on over-the-air television were held by Globo at the time, aired on Ulbra TV without even having a DVD release. In June 2010, the station sealed a partnership with Rede Bandeirantes to show its news and drama productions and receive national news generated by the BandNews TV agency. The following year, with the federal government taking ownership of the Ulbra Saúde headquarters in Porto Alegre, it moved to the university campus in Canoas. Its studios were located on building 16, occupied since 2012 by the Ulbratech technological park and which previously housed Museu de Tecnologia da Ulbra.

In 2013, to mark its repositioning as an educational station, Ulbra TV evaluated a content exchange agreement with TV Cultura from São Paulo. Negotiations took place during the second half of the year until the contract was signed in December, and the retransmission of the São Paulo network began on January 10, 2014. The affiliation was celebrated in August in a ceremony at the Legislative Assembly of Rio Grande do Sul. In 2017, the station launched its digital signal on physical channel 50, which is seen on virtual channel 48.1. The digitization progress continued in March 2018, with the switch-off of the analog signals in the Porto Alegre metropolitan area, and ended in 2020, when all of its programming began to be produced in high definition.

On January 6, 2025, Ulbra TV changed its name to MultiRS. The rebrand had already been carried out on their Internet profiles at Christmas. According to its CEO Orestes de Andrade Jr., the new identification represents the evolution of media through digital channels. To mark the change, a studio was set up in the Ramblas commercial complex, in Xangri-lá, to generate some programs and reporters' input until Carnaval. On March 10, the station started concentrating all of its local programming in a daily five-hour strand, from 4pm to 9pm, which, according to Andrade Jr., has higher ratings on over-the-air television. From October 6, the station's name reverted to Ulbra TV. According to Ulbra's superintendent, Ruy Irigaray, the identification has more recognition among the public and customers.

== Technical information ==
Virtual channel	Digital channel	Screen	Content
48.1	50 UHF	1080i	MultiRS/TV Cultura's main schedule

Based on the federal decree transitioning Brazilian TV stations from analog to digital signals, Ulbra TV, as well as the other stations in Porto Alegre, ceased broadcasting on UHF channel 48 on March 14, 2018, following the official ANATEL roadmap.
