= Herval =

Municipality of Rio Grande do Sul, Brazil

- Municipality
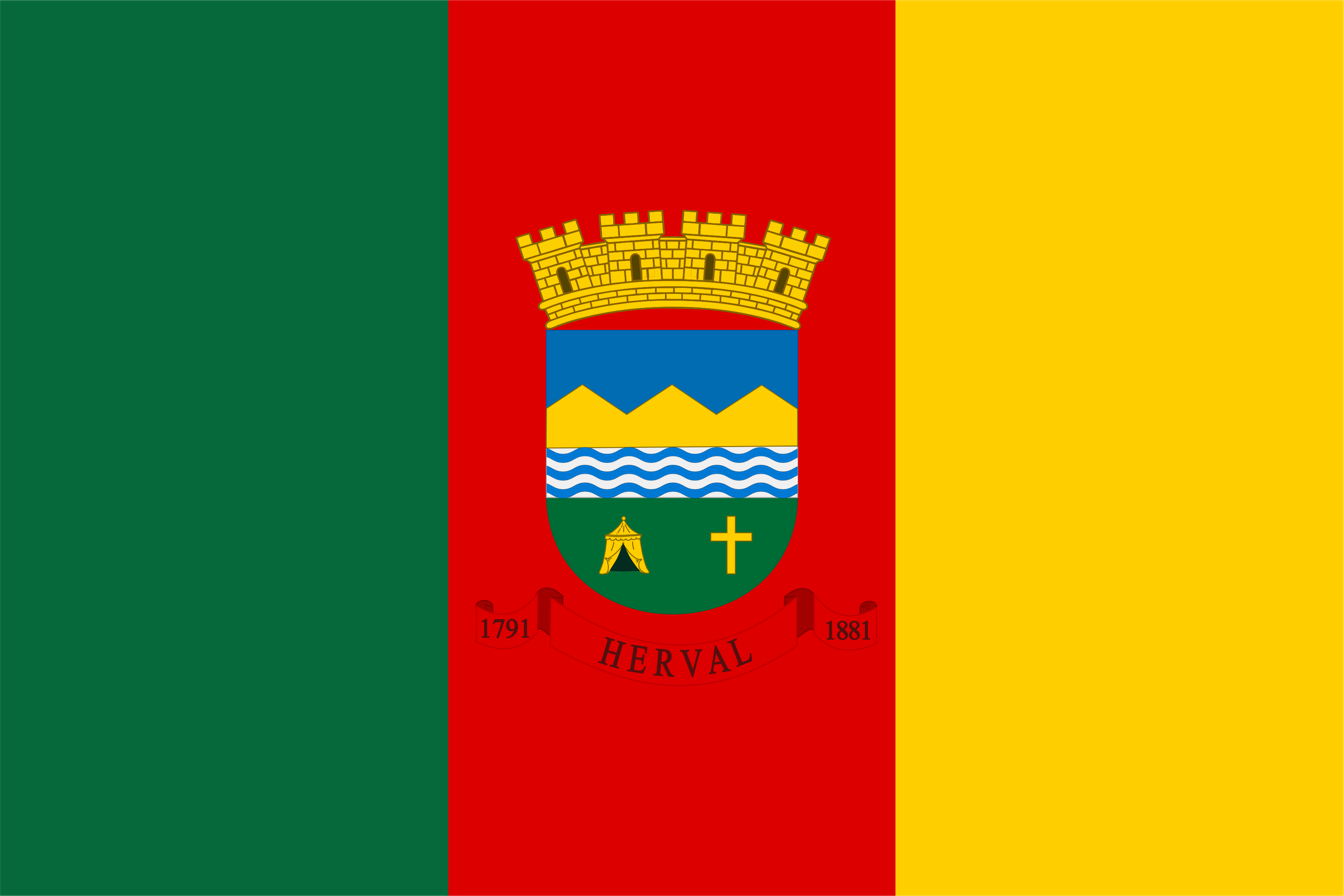
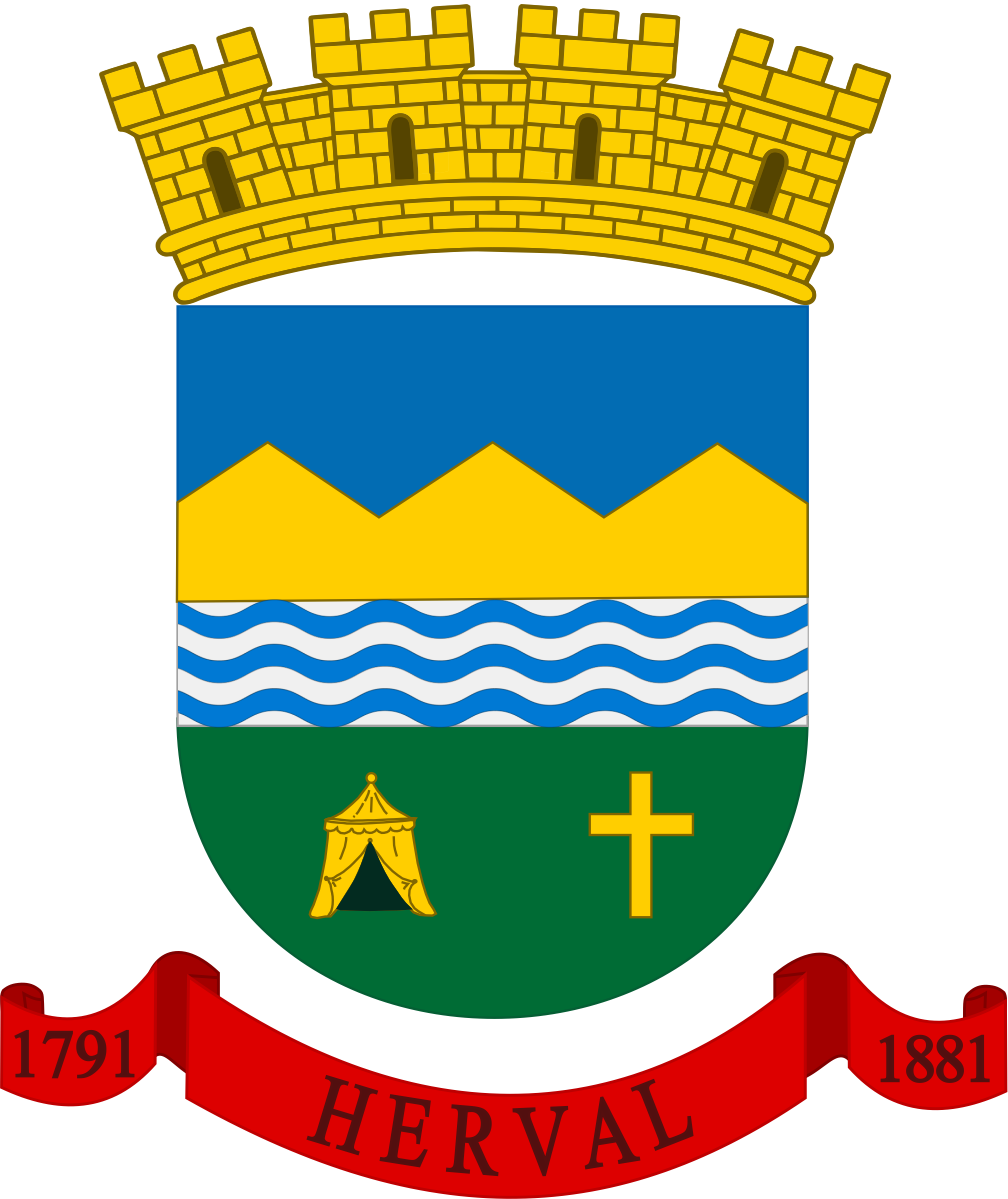
- Flag Coat of arms

- Location in Rio Grande do Sul state

- Location in Brazil
- Coordinates: 32°1′26″S 53°23′45″W
- Country: Brazil
- Region: South
- State: Rio Grande do Sul
- Mesoregion: Sudeste Rio-Grandense
- Microregion: Jaguarão

Area
  - Total: 1,757.84 km^{2} (678.71 sq mi)

Population (2020)
  - Total: 6,814
  - Density: 3.876/km^{2} (10.04/sq mi)
- Time zone: UTC−3 (BRT)
- Website: www.herval.rs.gov.br

Herval is a Brazilian municipality in the southern part of the state of Rio Grande do Sul. The population is 6,814 (2020 est.) in an area of 1,757.84 km^{2} (678.71 sq mi). Its elevation is 287 m. Its main industry is agriculture.

Herval is situated south of the Piratini River, which was defined in 1777 as the border between the Spanish and Portuguese possessions. The current border between Uruguay and Brazil lies further south, at the Jaguarão River.

Herval is famous for its international rodeo festival, organized every January.

== Bounding municipalities ==
- Arroio Grande
- Jaguarão
- Pedras Altas
- Pedro Osório
- Pinheiro Machado
- Piratini

== See also ==
- List of municipalities in Rio Grande do Sul
