= Capão =

Capão may refer to the following places in Brazil:

- Capão, Bahia. A village in the Chapada Diamantina region
- Capão Alto, Santa Catarina
- Capão Bonito, São Paulo
- Capão da Canoa, Rio Grande do Sul
- Capão do Cipó, Rio Grande do Sul
- Capão do Leão, Rio Grande do Sul
- Capão Grande River, Paraná
