= Capão do Leão =

Town in Rio Grande do Sul, Brazil

- Municipality
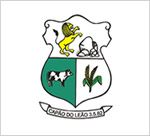
- Flag Coat of arms

- Map of the state of Rio Grande do Sul, Brazil highlighting Capão do Leão
- Coordinates: 31°45′46″S 52°29′2″W
- Country: Brazil
- Region: South
- State: Rio Grande do Sul
- Micro-region: Pelotas
- Founded: May 8, 1982

Area
  - Total: 785.37 km^{2} (303.23 sq mi)
- Elevation: 21 m (69 ft)

Population (2020)
  - Total: 25,409
  - Density: 32.353/km^{2} (83.794/sq mi)
- Demonym: Leonense
- Time zone: UTC−3 (BRT)
- IBGE code: 4304663
- Distance from the capital: 274 km (170 mi) WSW
- Website: www.capaodoleao.rs.gov.br

Capão do Leão is a Brazilian municipality in the southern part of the state of Rio Grande do Sul. The population is 25,409 (2020 est.) in an area of 785.37 km^{2}. The city hosts the main campus of Universidade Federal de Pelotas, the largest higher education institution in the southern portion of Rio Grande do Sul.

== Bounding municipalities ==
- Pelotas
- Rio Grande
- Morro Redondo
- Cerrito
- Pedro Osório
- Arroio Grande

== See also ==
- List of municipalities in Rio Grande do Sul
