= Arroio Grande =

Municipality of Rio Grande do Sul, Brazil

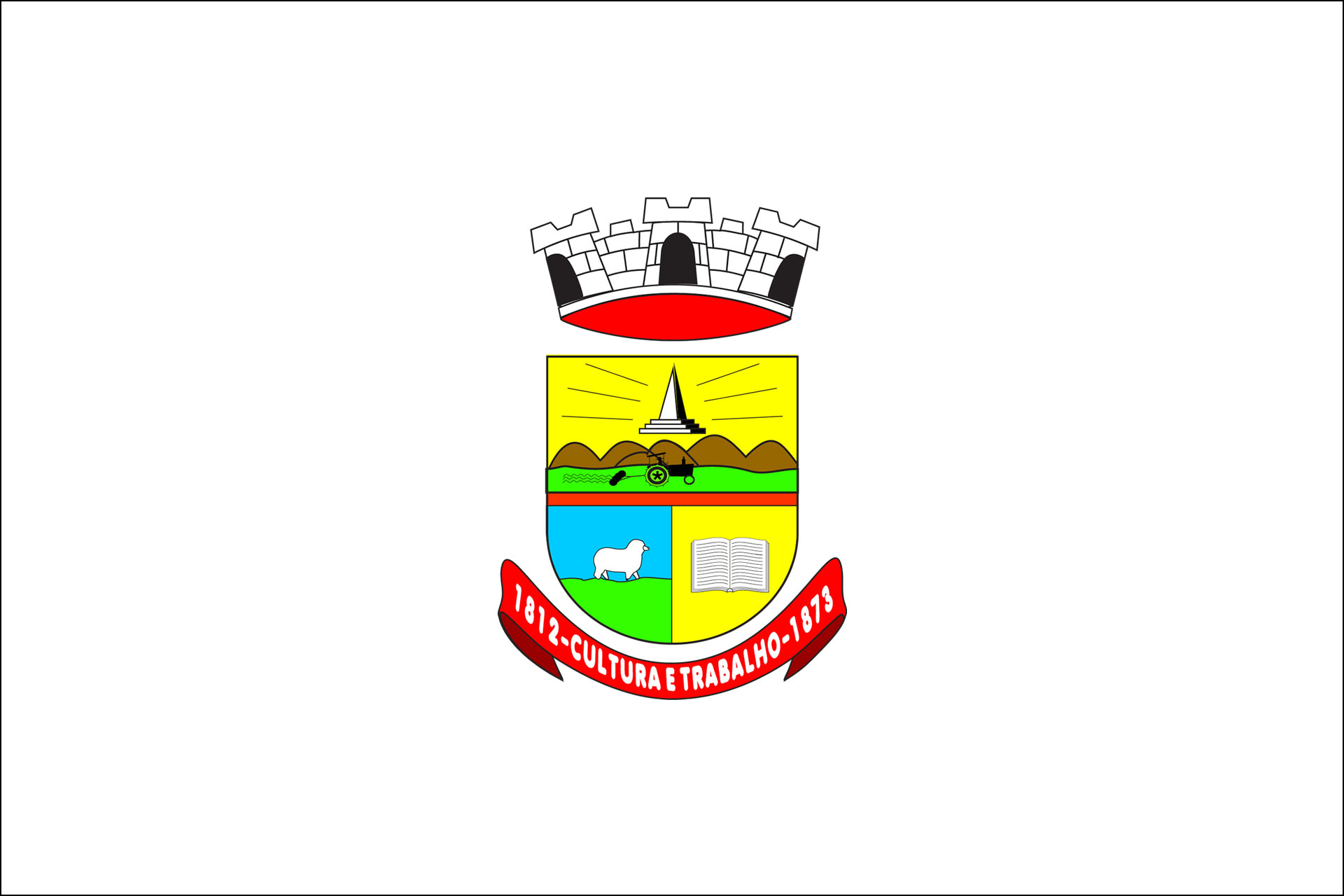
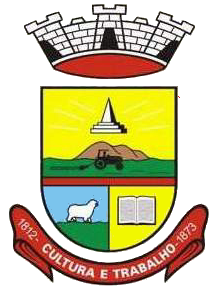
- Flag Coat of arms

- Location in Rio Grande do Sul state

- Location within Brazil
- Coordinates: 32°14′16″S 53°5′13″W
- Country: Brazil
- State: Rio Grande do Sul
- Mesoregion: Sudeste Rio-Grandense
- Microregion: Jaguarão

Government
  - Mayor: Jorge Luis Cardoso

Area
  - Total: 2,513.60 km^{2} (970.51 sq mi)
- Elevation: 22 m (72 ft)

Population (2020)
  - Total: 18,238
  - Density: 7.2557/km^{2} (18.792/sq mi)
- Website: Official website

Arroio Grande (Portuguese meaning the big stream) is a Brazilian municipality in the southern part of the state of Rio Grande do Sul. The population is 18,238 (2020 est.) in an area of 2,513.60 km^{2} (970.51 sq mi). Its second industry is agriculture which was primary until the 1970s, it currently has more urban population (80%) than rural (20%). Much of the area is made up of plains.

== History ==
The settlement was founded in 1803, around eighteen years before independence by Manuel Jerônimo de Sousa, who was Baron of Mauá's grandfather. In the right bank, the Ferreira family halted the construction, on the right bank, the sons of Manuel de Sousa Gusmão constructed secretly a ranch.

Under law 54 of May 26, 1846, it was lifted to a parish as Nossa Senhora da Graça de Arroio Grande. Under law 596 on January 2, 1867, the municipality of Jaguarão was divided into five districts, one of which was Arroio Grande.

Under the provincial law 843 on March 24, 1873, it became a town with a same name. Under law 590 on November 5, 1890, it became a city with the name Federação, but on July 6, 1891, under law 522, it was renamed to Arroio Grande.

In 1959, the municipality lost part of its area which became the new municipality of Pedro Osório.

== Geography ==
=== Districts ===
- Arroio Grande
- Mauá
- Pedreiras
- Santa Izabel do Sul

=== Bounding municipalities ===
- Capão do Leão
- Herval
- Jaguarão
- Pedro Osório
- Rio Grande

=== Streams ===
- Arroio Grande
- Arroio Chasqueiro
- Arroio Bretanhas
- Arroio Parapó

All streams empty into Lagoa Mirim.

=== Climate ===
Arroio Grande has one of the coolest climate in Brazil, its climate is subtropical, its medium annual temperature is 17.5 °C.

== Demographics ==
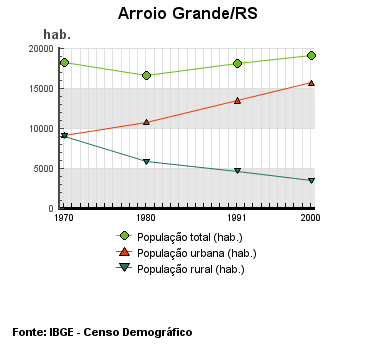
Graph of the population of the town in Portuguese

== Economy ==
Its main agricultural products are rice, soy, wheat, corn and a few more, cattle includes bovines and ovine.

Product	Tons
Rice (in bags)	216,000
Soy	22,907
Wheat	2,700
Corn	2,400

_{Data: IBGE/2004}

=== Transportation ===
Arroio Grande is connected with the national road BR-116, one of the main roads of Mercosul, and additionally the state roads RS-602 and RS-473.

== Education ==
- Escola Estadual Ministro Francisco Brochado da Rocha
- Escola Estadual Cândida Silveira Haubman
- Escola Estadual 20 de Setembro
- Instituto de Educação Aimone Soares Carriconde
- Escola Municipal de Ensino Fundamental Presidente João Goulart

== See also ==
- Irineu Evangelista de Souza (Baron of Mauá).
- Gumercindo Saraiva
- Uladislau Herculano de Freitas
- List of municipalities in Rio Grande do Sul
