= Xavier Robson =

Brazilian footballer (1986–2024)

Personal information
- Full name: Róbson Xavier Valim Schuelter
- Date of birth: 19 May 1986
- Place of birth: Pedro Osório, Rio Grande do Sul, Brazil
- Date of death: 2 February 2024 (aged 37)
- Place of death: Pelotas, Rio Grande do Sul, Brazil
- Height: 1.82 m (6 ft 0 in)
- Position: Midfielder

Senior career*
Years	Team	Apps	(Gls)
2003–2007	Brasil de Pelotas		
2007–2010	Peñarol	5	(0)
2009	→ Atenas de San Carlos (loan)		
2010	→ Esportivo (loan)	7	(0)
2010–2012	Tacuarembó	23	(0)
- * Club domestic league appearances and goals

Róbson Xavier Valim Schuelter (19 May 1986 – 2 February 2024), known as Xavier Robson, was a Brazilian professional footballer who played as a midfielder.

== Career ==
Xavier Robson was born in Pedro Osório on 19 May 1986.

Robson started his professional career with Brasil de Pelotas, for whom he played from 2003 to 2007, achieving promotion to Campeonato Gaúcho in 2004.

In 2007, he joined Uruguayan club Peñarol, and played for the club in the 2008–09 and 2009–10 seasons, making five Uruguayan Primera División appearances and winning the 2009–10 Uruguayan Primera División. In 2010 he played for Campeonato Gaúcho side Esportivo on loan from Peñarol.

== Later life and death ==
After retiring from professional playing, Xavier Robson continued to play at amateur level in Brazil and worked as a security guard.

Robson died from peritoneal cancer in Pelotas, on 2 February 2024, at the age of 37.

== Honours ==
Peñarol

- Uruguayan Primera División: 2009–10
