= Microregion of Pelotas =

Coordinates: 31°46′19″S 52°20′34″W

Pelotas
- Micro-region
- Country: Brazil
- State: Rio Grande do Sul
- Mesoregion: Sudeste Rio-Grandense
- Municipalities: 10

Area
  - Total: 10,307 km^{2} (3,980 sq mi)

The Pelotas Microregion (Portuguese: Microrregião de Pelotas) is a microregion in the southeastern part of the state of Rio Grande do Sul, Brazil. The area is 10,306.601 km^{2}.

== Municipalities ==
The microregion consists of the following municipalities:

- Arroio do Padre
- Canguçu
- Capão do Leão
- Cerrito
- Cristal
- Morro Redondo
- Pedro Osório
- Pelotas
- São Lourenço do Sul
- Turuçu
