= TVE (Rio Grande do Sul) =

Television station in Porto Alegre, Brazil

TV Educativa (ZYP 120)
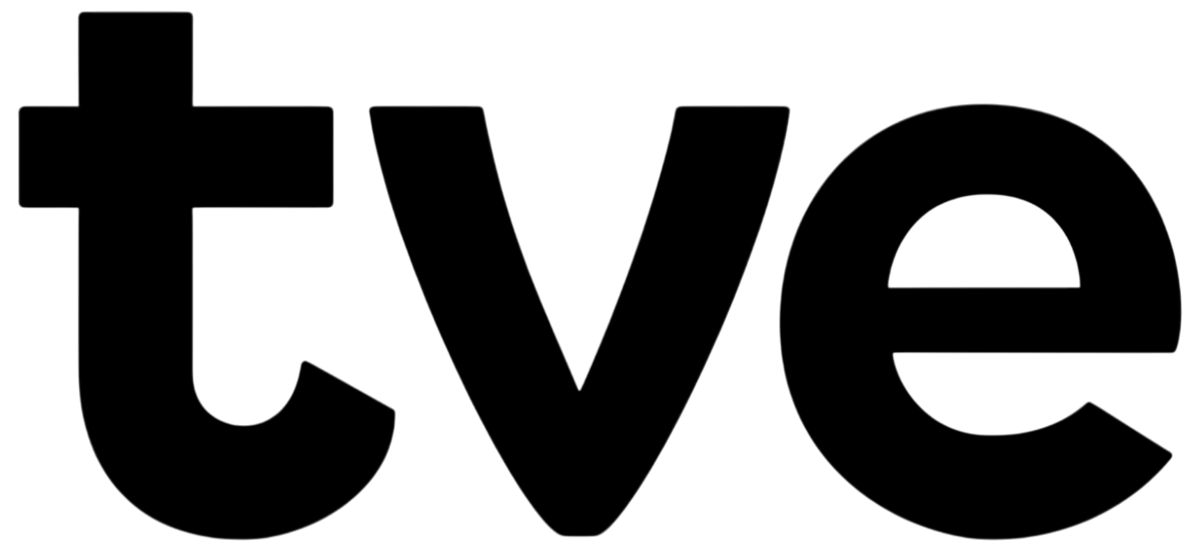
- Porto Alegre, Rio Grande do Sul; Brazil
- Channels: Digital: 30 (UHF); Virtual: 7
- Branding: TVE RS

Programming
- Affiliations: TV Brasil

Ownership
- Owner: Secretaria de Comunicação e Inclusão Social; (Government of the State of Rio Grande do Sul)

History
- First air date: March 29, 1974
- Former call signs: ZYB 621 (1974–2018)
- Former channel numbers: Analog: 7 (VHF, 1974–2018)
- Former affiliations: TVE Brasil (1975–1991); TV Cultura (1991–2011; 2015–2020)

Technical information
- Licensing authority: Anatel
- ERP: 4 kW
- Transmitter coordinates: 30°4′46.7″S 51°11′13″W

Links
- Website: tve.com.br

TV Educativa (also known as TVE RS) is a Brazilian television station based in Porto Alegre, capital of the state of Rio Grande do Sul. It operates on channel 7 (UHF digital 30) and is affiliated to TV Brasil. The station, along with FM Cultura, is owned by the Radio Broadcasting and Audiovisual Directorate of the Secretariat of Communication and Digital Inclusion of the Government of the State of Rio Grande do Sul. Its studios are located in the neighborhood of Santa Tereza, in the former headquarters of TV Piratini, and its transmission antenna is at the top of Morro da Police.

== History ==
TV Educativa was inaugurated on 29 March 1974, and its programming was produced in partnership with the Pontifical Catholic University of Rio Grande do Sul (PUCRS).

The station broadcast in black-and-white until the beginning of the 1980s. When José Antônio Daudt took over its programming, in 1980, he managed to bring together a group of renowned journalists, such as Tânia Carvalho and Tatata Pimentel for a live breakfast, where they discussed, in black-and-white broadcast, the issues of the moment.

In 1981, the station's headquarters, within the PUCRS campus, suffered a fire and the station ended up moving to the headquarters of the former TV Piratini, in Morro Santa Teresa, where it remains today, despite having a headquarters that has never been used since its foundation in the Porto Alegre Botanical Garden.

With the arrival of Cândido Norberto as president of the state-owned company, the broadcaster's programming began to stand out on the television scene in Rio Grande do Sul. The first program to make a big impact, still under the military dictatorship, was Pra Começo de Conversa, presented by Cunha Júnior and, later, by Eduardo Bueno. This program was the first to give space to rock bands from Rio Grande do Sul, being succeeded by Radar. It was presented daily at 7:30 pm and was set in a young girl's room, with LP records and posters of Jim Morrison, Janis Joplin and others on the walls. The presenter and guests sat on a single bed decorated with a guitar. Cândido Norberto also had his daily program, a long commentary lasting almost 15 minutes, before Pra Começo de Conversa, as a kind of ombdusman. Furthermore, there was a women's program, with Magda Beatriz, called Sem Retoque.

On 9 April 1983, the station's facilities suffered another fire, in the former headquarters of the defunct TV Piratini in Morro Santa Teresa, when the station's entire collection up until then and almost all of TV Piratini's film archives were lost.

Other programs were created at that time, making history. Tânia Carvalho presented Mãos à Obra daily, from 6 pm to 7 pm, with interviews about culture, music and behavior. Isabel Ibias started to present a cultural debate program at 1 pm.

The administration of Bibo Nunes, during the government of Alceu Collares, was certainly the most controversial. From this administration onwards, TVE's affiliation with TV Cultura and also with TVE Brasil began. At that time, TVE RS acquired teleprompters, new cameras and expanded its transmitters throughout the State. He launched and presented the program 7 No Ar, based on Câmera 2, by Clóvis Duarte, which discussed local issues of the day in prime time. Alongside Bibo, Vera Armando, Rejane Noschang, Sérgio Schueller, Lena Kurtz and José Fontela. At lunchtime, Cidade Urgente was created, a program similar to Jornal do Almoço, including the participation of its recently fired presenter Maria do Carmo. They also participated in the commentary panel program with Eduardo Bueno, filmmaker José Pedro Goulart and others.

Alceu Collares' first lady, the then State Secretary of Education Neuza Canabarro, outraged by a comment made by Tânia Carvalho about the governor, invaded the studio where Mãos à Obra was made and successfully demanded the immediate cancellation of the program.

The Radar program marked an era, giving space to rock bands from Rio Grande do Sul and visitors, tips for young people and cultural information. One of the first presenters was Marla Martins.

In the 2000s, the broadcaster joined the Public Television Network, founded in the previous decade, unifying several educational broadcasters, including TVE itself, TV Cultura and TVE Brasil. This network was disbanded on 1 December 2007.

Since 2 December 2007, the day of the inauguration of TV Brasil, TVE-RS stopped transmitting the programs that were shown by the extinct TVE Brasil and started retransmitting only the TV Cultura signal.

From February 2011, TVE began to be part of the National Public Communication Network and to retransmit part of TV Brasil's programming for free, broadcasting the new network's programming en masse. After five years off the air, he returns to São Borja on Fronteira-Oeste with channel 4.

In February 2014, the broadcaster made the first official broadcast in high definition: coverage of the Porto Alegre Carnival, showing the parades of the Intermediate A, Access groups and Carnival Tribes parades. Along with the carnival festivities, a new version of its logo debuted, in celebration of its 40th anniversary.

In 2015, under new management, the broadcaster suffered a major cost cut and the broadcast of the Porto Alegre Carnival was cancelled. On 18 May 2015, the broadcaster resumed its partnership with TV Cultura to retransmit its content. On 21 November 2016, governor José Ivo Sartori announced the extinction of the Piratini Foundation, which supported the broadcaster, leaving the broadcaster's future uncertain. On 21 December, the Legislative Assembly of Rio Grande do Sul approved the extinction of 6 foundations, including the Piratini Cultural Foundation. From then on, a series of court decisions barred the dismissals of the station's employees.

Collective bargaining for the dismissal of employees lasted almost the entire year of 2017, but was interrupted in October, when the State Government obtained an injunction from Minister Gilmar Mendes so that he could refrain from negotiating with employees. Subsequently, a new injunction was granted by the Labor Court, indicating that Foundation employees approved through a competition could not be fired because they had acquired stability. The government appealed again to the STF so that it could terminate the contract, without success.

To circumvent the injunction and continue with the termination process, the state government terminated the employees without stability in November 2017, established a Voluntary Dismissal Program and studied the reallocation of the rest of the staff in early 2018. Subsequently, the termination became the target of the State Court of Auditors, which requested, via precautionary measure, the suspension of the process in April 2018, until the completion of an audit that pointed out the guarantee of maintenance of services essential services provided by the Foundation after its extinction – namely, the production and dissemination of content linked to public communication.

In May 2018, the Federal Public and Accounting Ministries issued a recommendation to the State Government not to extinguish the Piratini Foundation. The bodies claimed that the end of the entity and the transmission of the stations to a secretary would cause both to lose their public character and acquire a state character. The recommendation was also made to the Ministry of Science and Technology not to transfer the concession of TVE and FM Cultura to the State, and that they remain linked to the Foundation. The government, however, ignored the recommendation and filed a writ of mandamus at the RS Court of Justice, obtaining an injunction that overturned the Court of Auditors' precautionary measure and guaranteed, once again, the progress of the extinction process.

In light of the new decision, the government issued, at the end of May 2018, a decree declaring the closure of the Piratini Foundation's activities. Although the CNPJ has not yet been extinguished and the concession remains linked to the entity, the activities previously linked to the Foundation are now transmitted to the Directorate of Broadcasting and Audiovisual of the Secretariat of Communication. The decree also defined the extinction of the Foundation's Deliberative Council, made up of 26 members from entities that represent the interests of Civil Society (such as CPERS for teachers, Famurs for municipalities, among others) and fundamental for maintaining the diversity of broadcasters' programming. In its place, an Advisory Council was created, made up of 11 members from 3 State secretariats, 4 private foundations and associations and two members of Civil Society appointed by the government, who will no longer guide the programming, but will only be consulted about it when the government requests it.

Despite claims that new programming should debut, the future of the broadcasters is still uncertain, since government sources, after the end of activities, reported that they still needed to think of an alternative to the old programs broadcast.

With the end of the Piratini Foundation's activities, TVE and FM Cultura are now linked to the new Directorate of Broadcasting and Audiovisual of the Secretariat of Communication. Until 4 June 2018, the broadcaster continued to retransmit the TV Brasil satellite signal, without local programming. A project to outsource the station's activities was announced, but did not receive approval from the then governor José Ivo Sartori because a legal study was not even carried out on the legality of the proposal.

A week later, TVE returned to the air, retransmitting TV Cultura and generating local programming.

Since 2019, with the beginning of Eduardo Leite's government, TVE teams were maintained, and the proposal to transfer the broadcaster to the private sector ended up being discarded. There was also a resumption of sports programming, through partners that allowed live broadcasting of the Campeonato Gaúcho de Futsal da Série Ouro, in addition to the final games of the Liga Gaúcha de Futsal. In 2020, after the COVID-19 pandemic, TVE needed to adapt to the state government's determinations. Most professionals started to work remotely, and the two main programs on the programming schedule, Estação Cultura and Radar, both focused on cultural journalism, were temporarily suspended, due to the postponement of several cultural activities in Rio Grande do Sul. At the same time, since May 2020, in partnership with the State Department of Education. TVE began broadcasting preparatory classes for the ENEM from Monday to Friday, with the aim of reducing the losses caused by the cancellation of face-to-face classes in public schools in the state.

On 18 August 2020, it stopped broadcasting on TV Cultura, but maintaining its partnership with TV Brasil.

== Technical information ==
Virtual channel	Digital channel	Screen	Content
7.1	30 UHF	1080i	TVE-RS's main schedule

On 6 August 2012, the Ministry of Communications granted the broadcaster channel 30 UHF for digital transmissions, and the broadcaster began broadcasting on an experimental basis at 5:00 pm on 1 October 2013. Its first broadcast of high definition content was the Porto Alegre Carnival in 2014.

The broadcaster announced on 13 January 2017, that it would turn off its analog signal on 31 January, exactly one year before the date scheduled in ANATEL's official schedule. At 0:01 on 1 February, the station ended its transmissions on VHF channel 7, leaving only the digital signal on the air.

On 22 March 2018, it was determined that the station was set to become the only one in the state to use subchannels. TVE-RS has capacity for four.

== Programas ==
Aside from relaying TV Brasil's national programs, TVE-RS produces the following local output:

- Consumidor em Pauta
- Ecodesafio
- Especiais TVE
- Estação Cultura
- Frente a Frente
- Histórias do Sul
- Radar
- Redação TVE
- Rio Grande Rural
- Singulares
- TVE Esportes

=== Former programs ===
- 7 no Ar
- Curta TVE
- Corpo & Alma
- Galpão Nativo
- Interação
- Jornal da TVE
- Linha Direta
- Mãos á Obra
- Minuto Rede RS
- Palcos da Vida
- Pandorga
- Panorama
- Paralelo Sul
- Primeira Pessoa
- Radiovisão
- Rede RS
- Sala de Aula
- TV Cine
- TVE em Dia
- TVE Meio-Dia
- TVE Repórter
- TVE Vestibular
- Trocando Ideias
- Viva Bem
- X da Questão

== Relays ==
- Bagé – 3 VHF
- Caçapava do Sul – 7 VHF
- Cachoeira do Sul – 9 VHF
- Carazinho – 44 UHF
- Cruz Alta – 34 UHF
- Erechim – 13 VHF
- Gramado – 28 VHF
- Itaqui – 49 UHF / 28 UHF digital
- Osório – 9 VHF
- Santa Cruz do Sul – 55 UHF / 30 UHF digital
- Santa Rosa – 9 VHF
- Santana do Livramento – 8 VHF
- Santo Ângelo – 10 VHF
- São Borja – 4 VHF
- Torres – 5 VHF
- Uruguaiana – 2 VHF
- Xangri-lá – 9 VHF

== Slogans ==
- 1991: Toda nova, toda nossa
- 1991: A visão do Rio Grande
- 2003: A TV pública do Rio Grande
- 2007: Faz bem ver
- 2014: Cultura muda sua vida
