= Camaquã State Park =

State park in Rio Grande do Sul, Brazil

- Parque Estadual do Camaquã
- IUCN category II (national park)
- Location within Brazil
- Nearest city: Camaquã, Rio Grande do Sul
- Coordinates: 31°10′26″S 51°46′52″W
- Area: 7,993 ha (30.86 sq mi)
- Designation: State park
- Created: 12 March 1975
- Administrator: Secretaria do Ambiente e Desenvolvimento Sustentável

The Camaquã State Park Portuguese: Parque Estadual do Camaquã is a state park in the state of Rio Grande do Sul, Brazil.

== Location ==
The Camaquã State Park is in the municipalities of Camaquã and São Lourenço do Sul, Rio Grande do Sul. It has an area of 7,993 hectares (19,750 acres). The park is in the transition between the pampas and Atlantic Forest biomes, mostly in the latter. It was created to protect the wetlands of the Camaquã River lagoon delta, including the Banhado do Caipira, Rincão do Escuro and many islands. It covers the banks of the Lagoa dos Patos from the Banhado do Caipira to the pontal, and covers the Camaquã river valley up to the settlement of Pacheca.

== History ==
The Camaquã State Park was created by decree 23.798 of 12 March 1975. As of 2016 the park did not have a management plan and was not open for visitors. The land had not been surveyed, and ownership had not been regularized.

== Sources ==
- Parque Estadual do Camaquã (in Portuguese), SEMA: Secretaria do Ambiente e Desenvolvimento Sustentável (RS)
- PES Camaquã (in Portuguese), ISA: Instituto Socioambiental
