= Turuçu =

Municipality of Rio Grande do Sul, Brazil

- Municipality
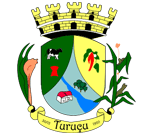
- Flag Coat of arms

- Location in Rio Grande do Sul state

- Location in Brazil
- Coordinates: 31°25′8″S 52°10′30″W
- Country: Brazil
- State: Rio Grande do Sul
- Meso-region: Sudeste Rio-Grandense
- Micro-region: Pelotas

Area
  - Total: 253.64 km^{2} (97.93 sq mi)
- Elevation: 30 m (98 ft)

Population (2020)
  - Total: 3,423
  - Density: 13.50/km^{2} (34.95/sq mi)
- Time zone: UTC−3 (BRT)
- Website: www.turucu.rs.gov.br

Turuçu is a Brazilian municipality in the southeastern part of the state of Rio Grande do Sul. It is nicknamed the National Capital of the Chili Pepper (Capital Nacional da Pimenta Vermelha). The population is 3,423 (2020 est.) in an area of 253.64 km^{2}. The name comes from a local Native American language. It lies close to the Lagoa dos Patos, a lagoon connected with the Atlantic Ocean.

== See also ==
- List of municipalities in Rio Grande do Sul
