= Microregion of Jaguarão =

Coordinates: 32°33′57″S 53°22′33″W

Jaguarão
- Microregion
- Country: Brazil
- State: Rio Grande do Sul
- Mesoregion: Sudeste Rio-Grandense
- Municipalities: 3

Area
  - Total: 6,331.282 km^{2} (2,444.522 sq mi)

The Jaguarão microregion (Brazilian Portuguese: Microrregião de Jaguarão) is a microregion in the southern part of the state of Rio Grande do Sul, Brazil. Its total area is 6,331.228 km².

== Municipalities ==
The microregion consists of the following municipalities:

- Arroio Grande
- Herval
- Jaguarão
