= Piratini River (São Gonçalo Channel) =

Location
- Country: Brazil

Physical characteristics
- Source
  - location: Rio Grande do Sul state
- Mouth: São Gonçalo Channel
  - coordinates: 32°1′S 52°25′W
- Length: 120 km (75 mi)

The River Piratini (Rio Piratini) is a Brazilian river in the southern state of Rio Grande do Sul. Until 1864 it marked, for most of its course, the accepted frontier between Uruguay and Brazil.

The river rises at the watershed between the Río de la Plata Basin and the land that slopes directly to the Ocean. The headwaters are in the area of Jóia, from where the river's 120 km (75 mile) trajectory runs almost all the way to the Atlantic, separated from the ocean only by the São Gonçalo Channel and the associated lagoons on the coastal frontier separating Brazil from Uruguay.

The Piratini's principal tributaries are the Santana Stream (arroyo Santana) on the right bank and the Iytuina and Capivaras Streams (arroyos Ituina & de los Carpinchos]] on the left bank.

Along its course the Piratini separates the municipalities of Pedro Osório and Cerrito from one another. The two are linked by a railway bridge which, unlike the surrounding buildings, withstood a destructive flood in 1992.

== The name ==
“Piratini” is a composite word meaning “rebellious fish” (pirá=fish; tiní=angry, rebellious etc.)

== See also ==
- List of rivers of Rio Grande do Sul
