= Uladislau Herculano de Freitas =

Brazilian politician and advocate (1865–1926)

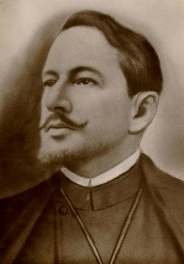

Minister of Justice
- In office 1913–1914

Minister of the Supreme Federal Court
- In office 1925–1926

Personal details
- Born: November 25, 1865 Arroio Grande, Brazil
- Died: May 14, 1926 (aged 60) Rio de Janeiro, Brazil
- Education: University of São Paulo

Uladislau Herculano de Freitas Guimarães (November 25, 1865 in Arroio Grande – May 14, 1926 in Rio de Janeiro) was a Brazilian politician and an advocate.

He entered public life in the 1890s. In 1913 and in 1914, he was Minister of Justice during the Hermes da Fonseca government. He was director of the Direct Faculty in São Paulo from 1916 to 1925.

In 1925, he was nominated to the ministry of the Supreme Federal Tribunal.
