= Morro Redondo =

Municipality of Rio Grande do Sul, Brazil

- Municipality
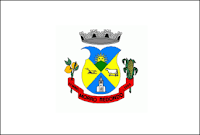
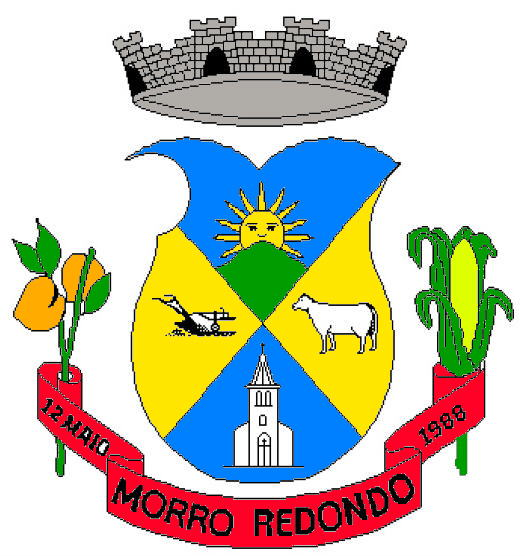
- Flag Coat of arms

- Location within Rio Grande do Sul

- Location in Brazil
- Coordinates: 31°35′18″S 52°37′55″W
- Country: Brazil
- State: Rio Grande do Sul
- Mesoregion: Sudeste Rio-Grandense
- Microregion: Pelotas
- Founded: May 12, 1988

Area
  - Total: 244.65 km^{2} (94.46 sq mi)
- Elevation: 245 m (804 ft)

Population (2020)
  - Total: 6,589
  - Density: 26.93/km^{2} (69.75/sq mi)
- Time zone: UTC−3 (BRT)
- IBGE code: 4312450
- Website: morroredondo.rs.gov.br

Morro Redondo (English: Rounded Hill) is a Brazilian municipality in the southern part of the state of Rio Grande do Sul. The population is 6,589 (2020 est.) in an area of 244.65 km². It is located 35 km (21.75 mi) from Pelotas.

== Demographics ==
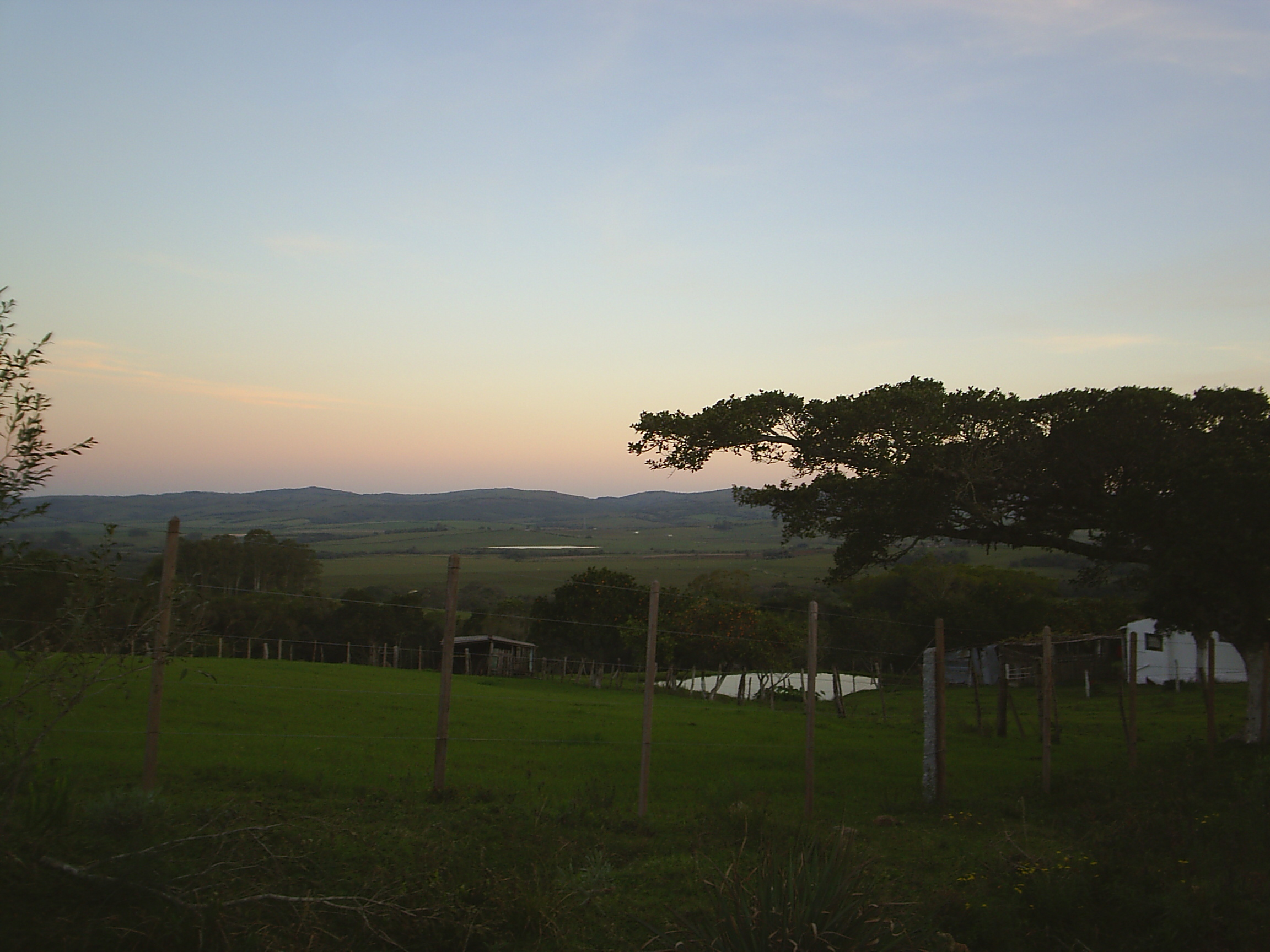
The countryside around Morro Redondo

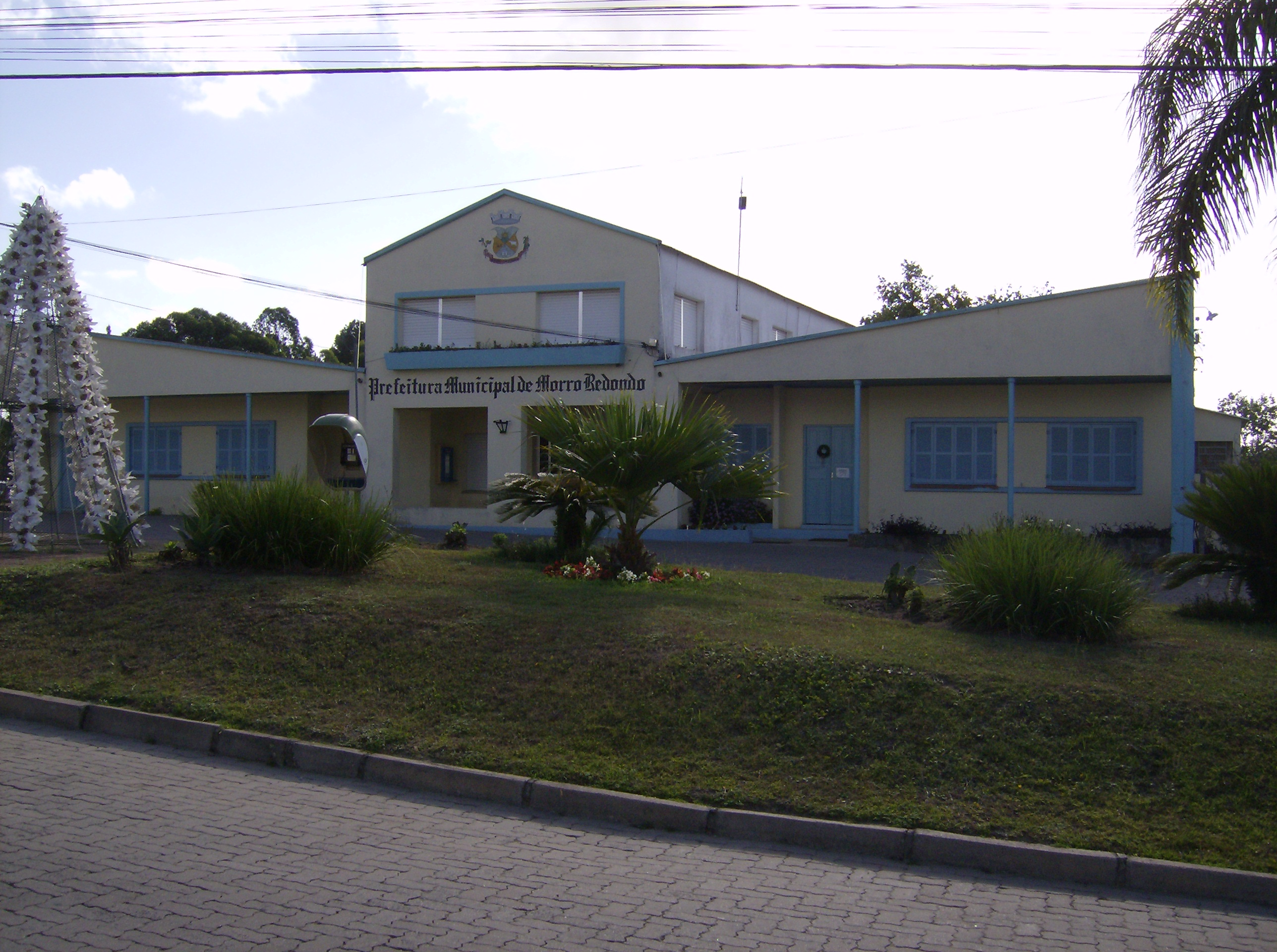
City hall

Much of the population have Portuguese origin mainly from the Azores and Germans mainly from Pomerania, the remainder were from Italy.

== Geography ==
Most of the area of the municipality are above 200 m (656.16 ft) of elevation. A vegetation of this area is mainly composed of fields with low and herbaceous vegetation (pampa). Small groves of cultivated trees (Babylon willow, eucalyptus, pine, cypress, acacia, poplar and platanus) and native trees (Cockspur coral tree and araucaria angustifolia) are also found.

The climate is subtropical or temperate, with pleasant summers, cool winters and frequent frosts (with an average of 20 per year). The hottest month is January with an average temperature of 21.7 °C (71.06 °F), and the coldest month is July with an average temperature of 11.7 °C (53.06 °F). The wettest month is February, with 150 mm (5.9 in) of precipitation. The average annual temperature in the municipality is 16.7 °C (62.06 °F). The average annual precipitation is 1,400 mm (55.11 in).

== See also ==
- List of municipalities in Rio Grande do Sul
