= Imbé =

Municipality of Rio Grande do Sul, Brazil

- Municipality
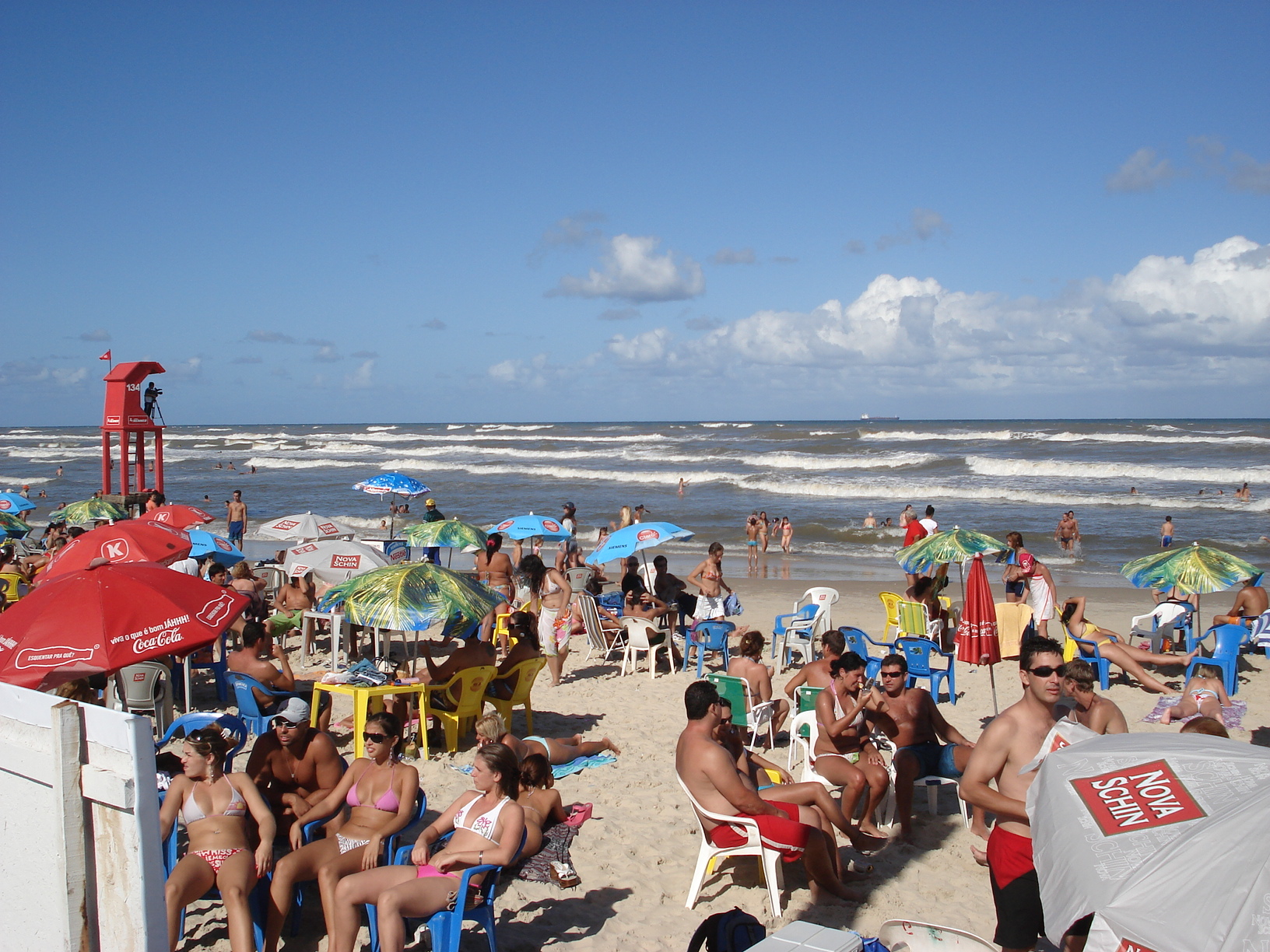

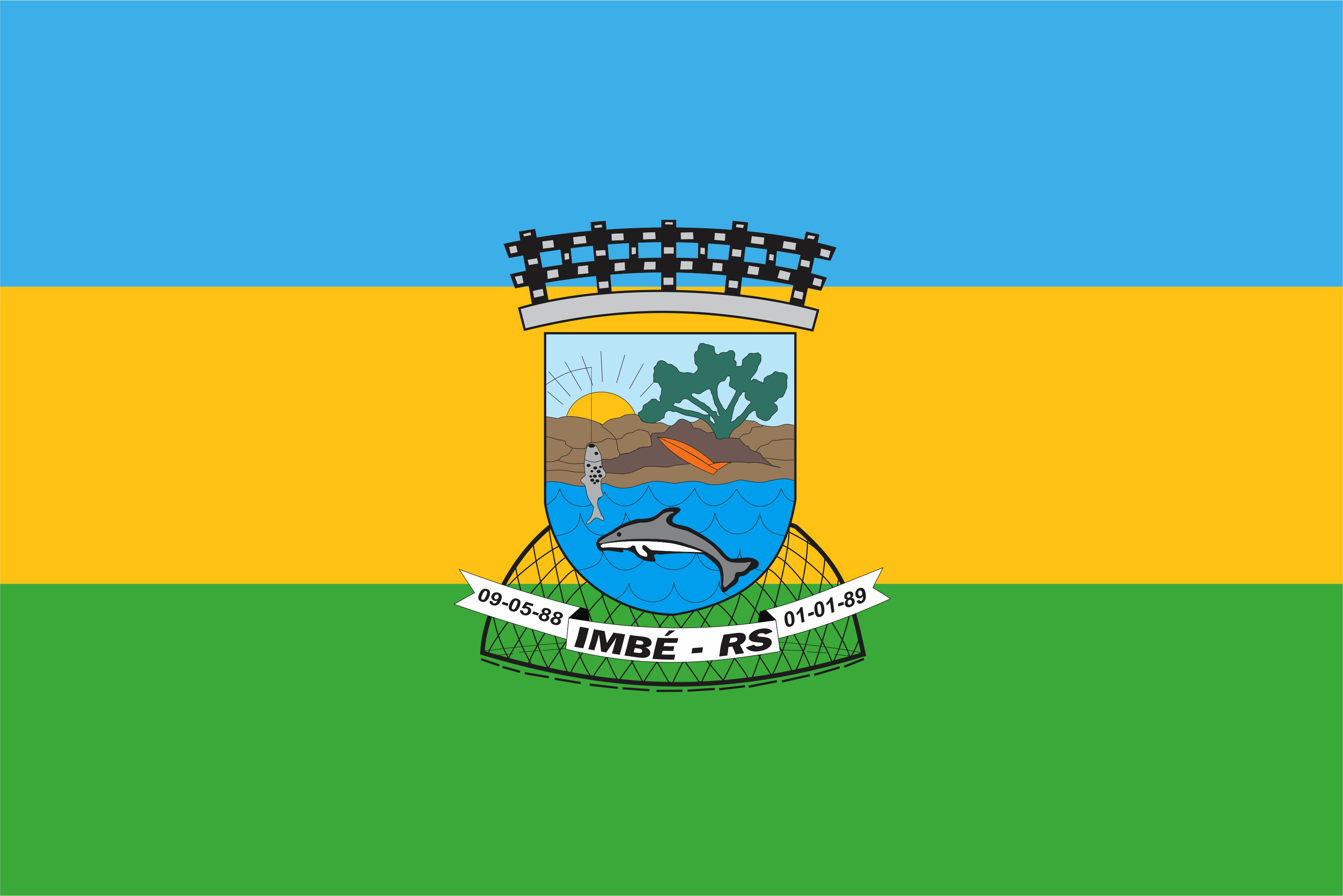
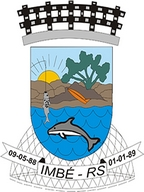
- Flag Coat of arms

- Location within Rio Grande do Sul

- Location in Brazil
- Coordinates: 29°58′30″S 50°07′40″W
- Country: Brazil
- State: Rio Grande do Sul

Population (2020)
  - Total: 23,271
- Time zone: UTC−3 (BRT)

Imbé is a municipality on the coastline of Rio Grande do Sul, the southernmost state of Brazil, 120 km (75 statute miles) east of Porto Alegre.

Its population is approximately 23 thousand. It has warm summers (average temperature 22 °C (72 °F) in January) and cool winters (14 °C (57 °F) in July).

Imbé separated from its neighbouring city, Tramandaí, in 1988. In that same year, many small municipalities were created in Rio Grande do Sul.

== See also ==
- List of municipalities in Rio Grande do Sul
