= Camaquã =

Municipality of Rio Grande do Sul, Brazil

- Municipality
- Municipality of Camaquã
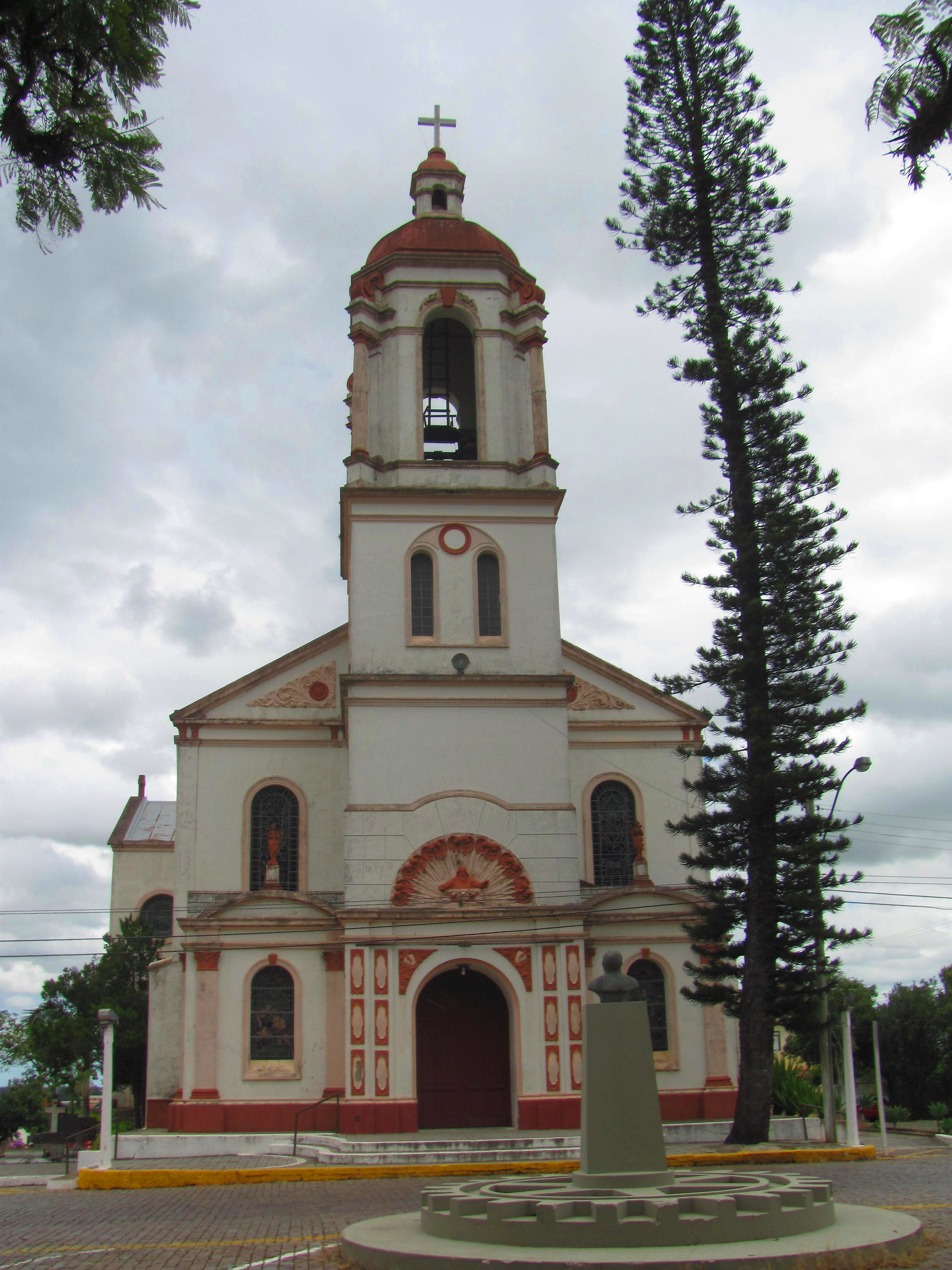
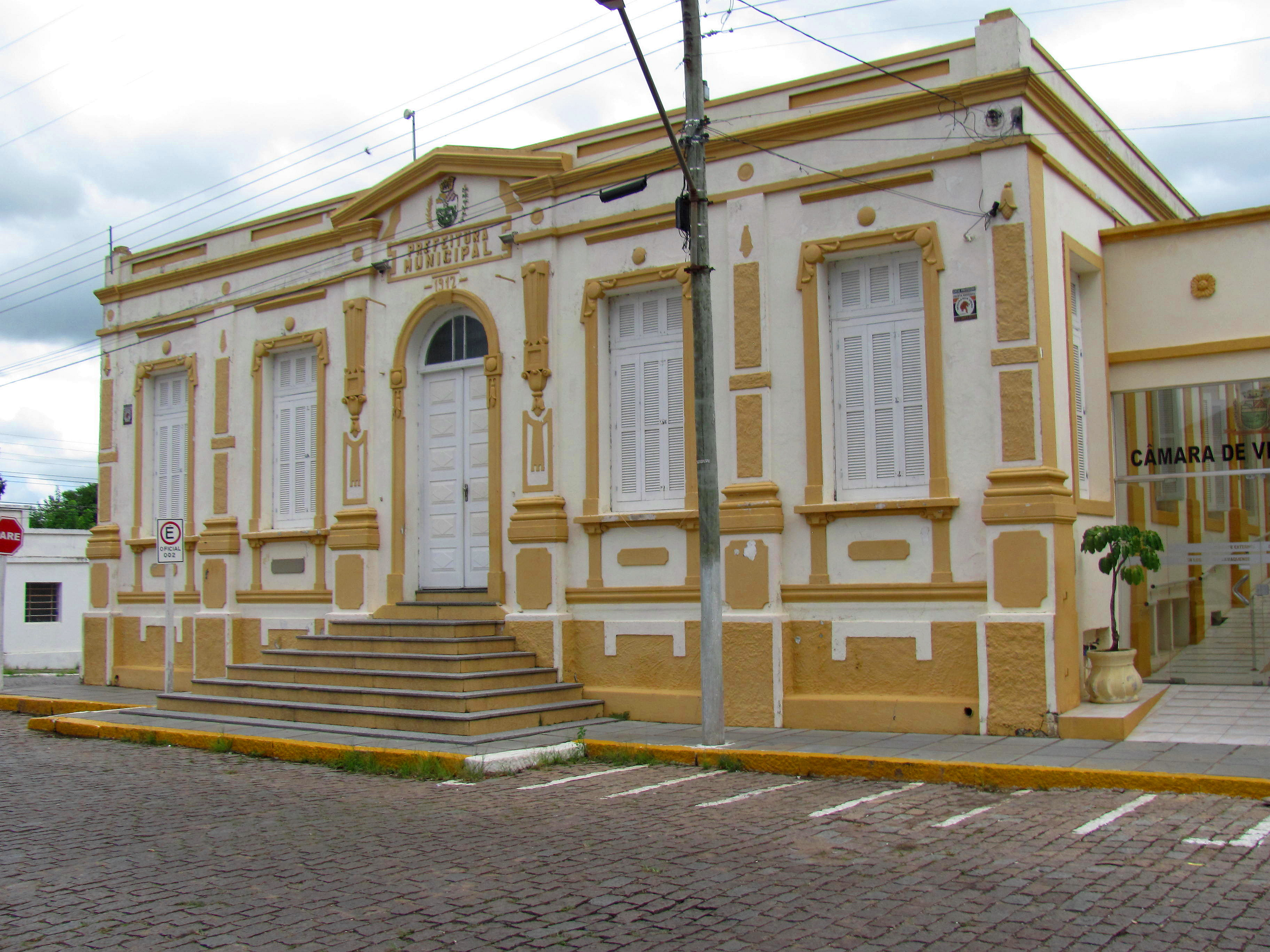
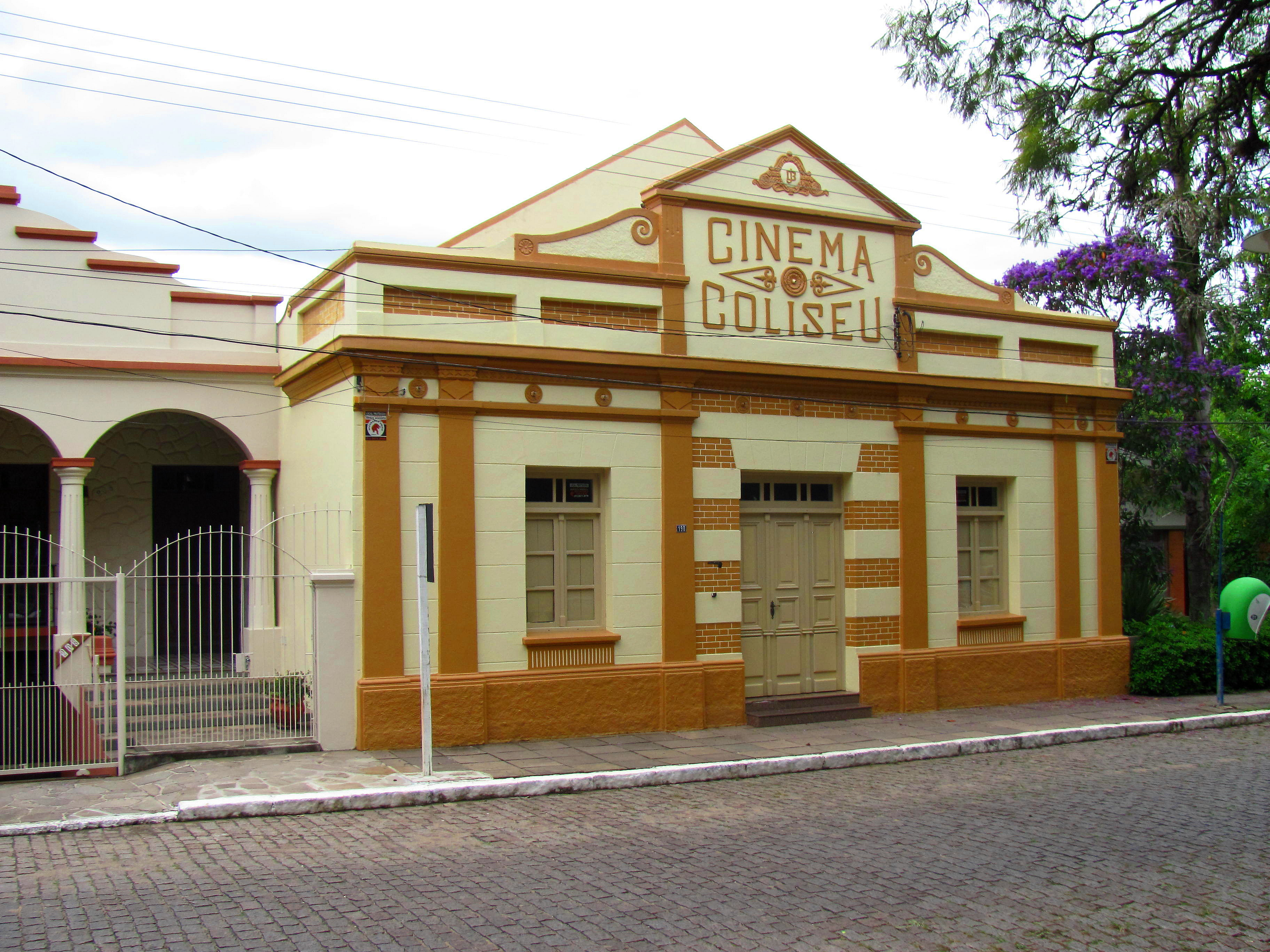
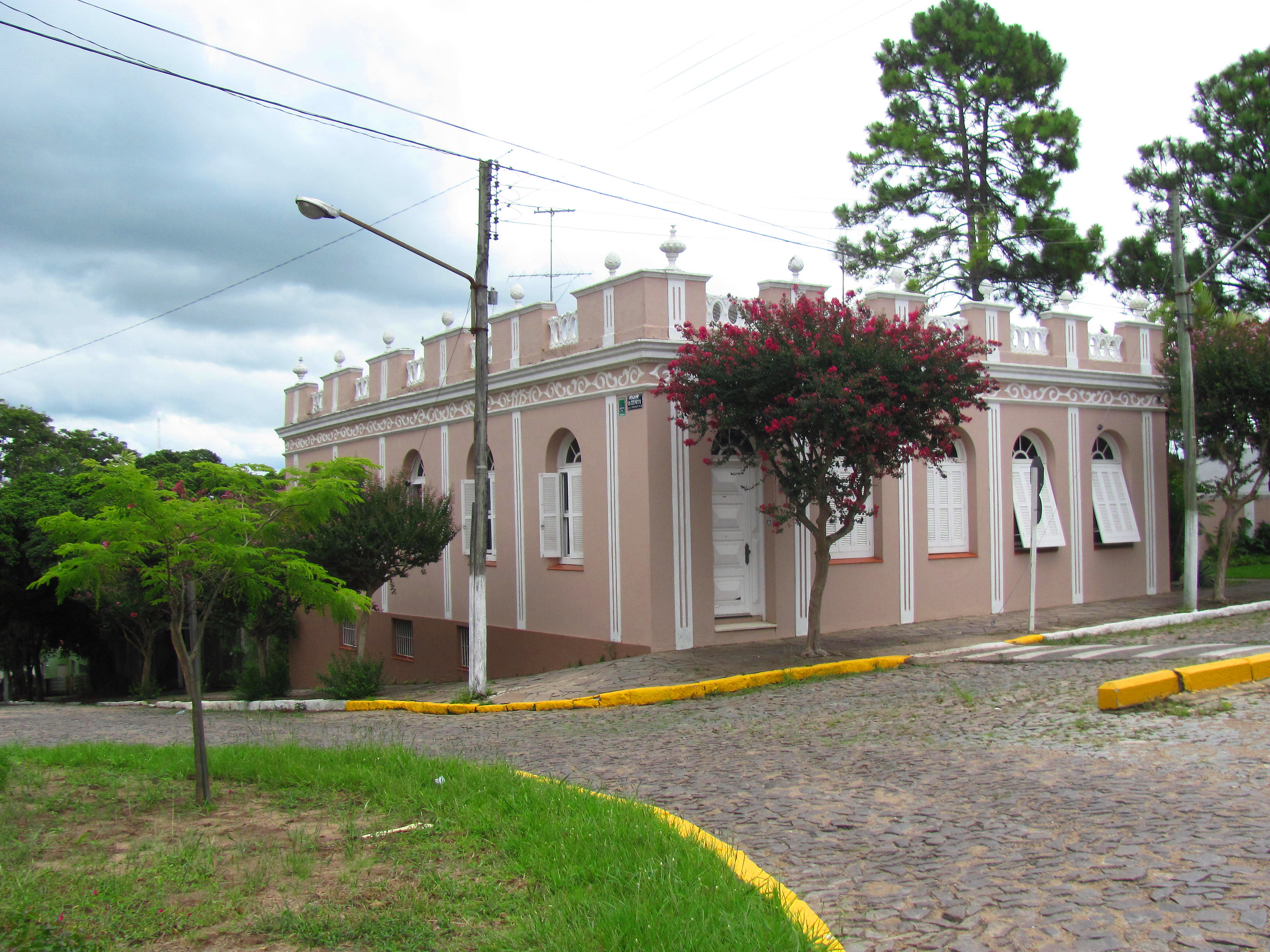
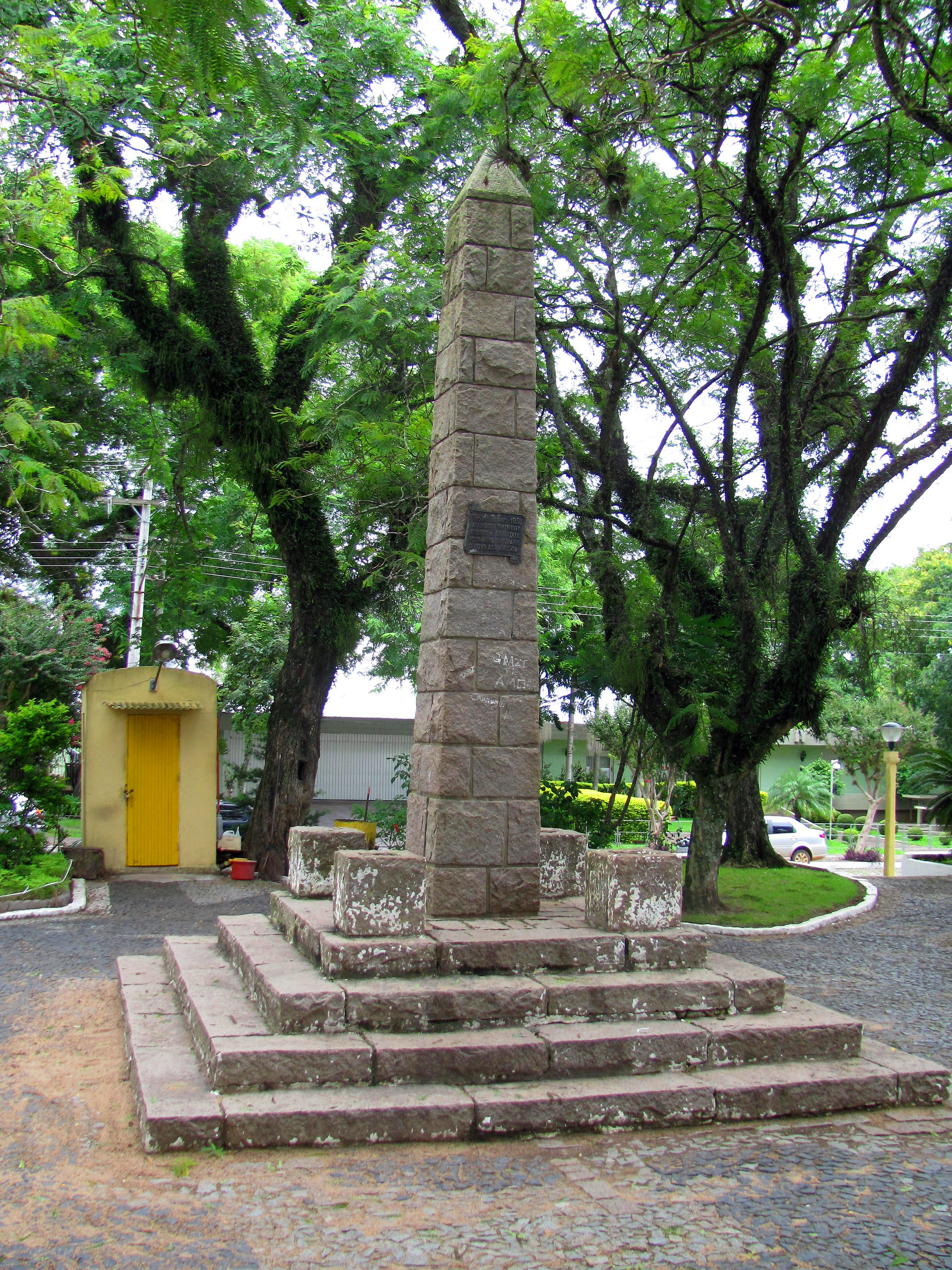
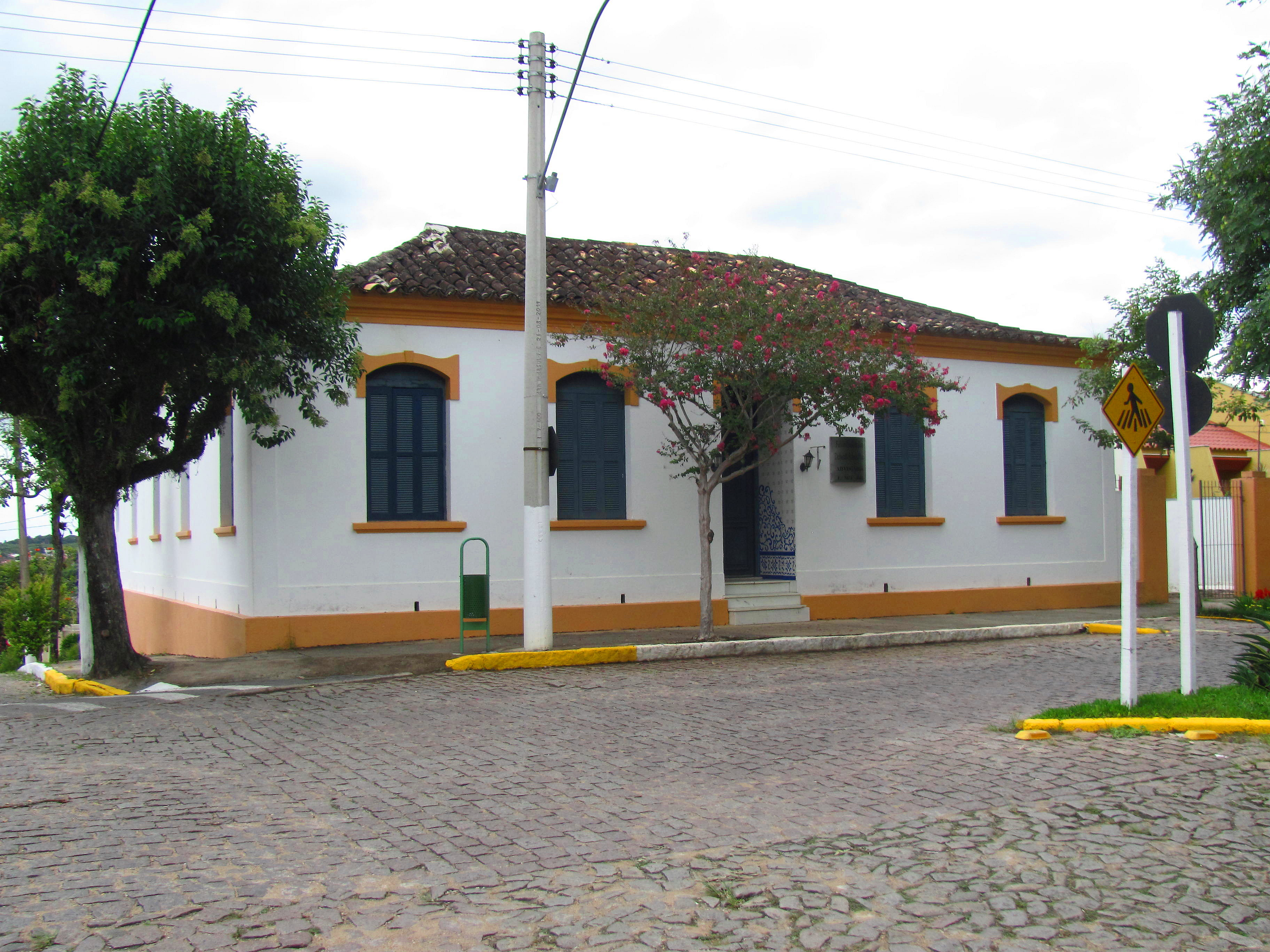

- Flag Coat of arms

- Location within Rio Grande do Sul

- Location in Brazil
- Coordinates: 30°51′S 51°49′W
- Country: Brazil
- State: Rio Grande do Sul

Government
  - Mayor: Ivo de Lima Ferreira

Area
  - Total: 1,679.556 km^{2} (648.480 sq mi)

Population (2020)
  - Total: 66,478
  - Density: 39.581/km^{2} (102.51/sq mi)
- Time zone: UTC−3 (BRT)
- HDI (2010): 0.768 – high

Camaquã is a municipality in the state of Rio Grande do Sul, Brazil.

The municipality contains part of the 7,993-hectare (19,750-acre) Camaquã State Park, which was created in 1975.

== See also ==
- List of municipalities in Rio Grande do Sul
