= Cidreira =

Municipality of Rio Grande do Sul, Brazil

- Municipality
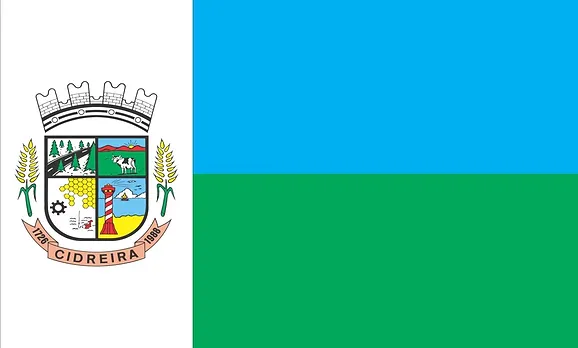
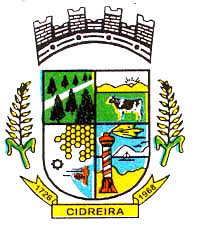
- Flag Coat of arms

- Location within Rio Grande do Sul

- Location in Brazil
- Coordinates: 30°9′39″S 50°14′2″W
- Country: Brazil
- State: Rio Grande do Sul

Population (2020)
  - Total: 16,583
- Time zone: UTC−3 (BRT)

Cidreira is a municipality in the state of Rio Grande do Sul, Brazil.

== Geography ==
It is located at a latitude of 30º09'39" South and a longitude of 50º14'02" West, at an altitude of 60 meters above sea level. Its estimated population for 2006 was 11,767 inhabitants. It occupies an area of 246,362 km^{2}.

== See also ==
- List of municipalities in Rio Grande do Sul
