= Lagoon Mirim =

Lagoon in Rio Grande do Sul

- Location within Brazil
- Location: Brazil and Uruguay
- Coordinates: 32°45′S 52°50′W
- Type: estuarine lagoon
- Primary outflows: São Gonçalo Channel
- Catchment area: 47,756.3 km^{2} (18,438.8 mi^{2})
- Max. length: 174 kilometres (108 mi)
- Max. width: 10 to 35 km (6 to 22 mi)
- Surface area: 3,750 km^{2} (1,450 sq mi) to 3,899.7 km^{2} (1,505.7 mi^{2})
- Average depth: 6 m (20 ft)
- Water volume: 23.4 km^{3} (5.6 cu mi)
- Surface elevation: 0 m (0 ft)

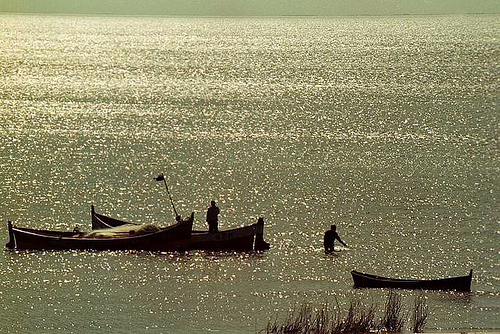
Fishermen at Lagoon Mirim

Lagoon Mirim (Portuguese, pronounced [miˈɾĩ]) or Merín (Spanish, pronounced [meˈɾin]) is a large estuarine lagoon which extends from southern Rio Grande do Sul state in Brazil into eastern Uruguay. Lagoa Mirim is separated from the Atlantic Ocean by a sandy, partially barren isthmus.

The Jaguarão/Yaguarón, Tacuarí and Cebollatí Rivers empty into Lagoon Mirim, while the São Gonçalo Channel connects it with Lagoa dos Patos to the north.

== Location ==
Lagoon Mirim is about 174 kilometres (108 mi) long by 10 to 35 km (6 to 22 mi) wide and 3,750 km^{2} (1,450 sq mi) in area. It is more irregular in outline than its larger neighbor to the north, Lagoa dos Patos, and discharges into the latter through São Gonçalo Channel, which is navigable by small boats. Lagoa Mirim has no direct connection to the Atlantic, but the Rio Grande, a tidal channel about 39 km (24 mi) long which connects Lagoon dos Patos to the Atlantic, affords an entrance to the navigable inland waters of both lagoons and several small ports. Both lagoons are the remains of an ancient depression in the coastline shut in by sand beaches built up by the combined action of wind and oceanic currents. They are at the same level as the ocean, but their waters are affected by the tides and are brackish only a short distance above the Rio Grande outlet.

The Taim Ecological Station lies to the east of the lagoon, in the narrow land strip between it and the Atlantic Ocean. The Jaguarão/Yaguarón River, which forms part of the Brazil-Uruguay boundary line, empties into Lagoon Mirim, and is navigable 42 km (26 mi) up to and beyond the twin towns of Jaguarão (Brazil) and Rio Branco (Uruguay). On the Uruguayan side apart from the Yaguarón River, the Cebollatí River and the Tacuarí River empty into the Lagoon Mirim. The amount of water received by the lagoon is greater from the Uruguayan side.

== See also ==
- Topography and hydrography of Uruguay
- 1851 Boundary Treaty (Brazil–Uruguay)
- Jaguarão River#Navigability
