= Cerrito, Rio Grande do Sul =

Municipality in Rio Grande do Sul, Brazil

Cerrito
- Municipality
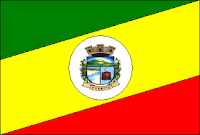
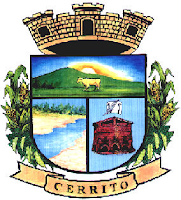
- Flag Coat of arms

- Location in Rio Grande do Sul state

- Location in Brazil
- Coordinates: 31°51′23″S 52°48′46″W
- Country: Brazil
- Region: South
- State: Rio Grande do Sul
- Mesoregion: Sudeste Rio-Grandense
- Microregion: Pelotas

Area
  - Total: 451.70 km^{2} (174.40 sq mi)
- Elevation: 50 m (160 ft)

Population (2020)
  - Total: 6,047
  - Density: 13.39/km^{2} (34.67/sq mi)
- Time zone: UTC−3 (BRT)
- Postal code: 96935-xxx
- Website: www.cerrito.rs.gov.br

Cerrito is a Brazilian municipality in the southern part of the state of Rio Grande do Sul. The population is 6,047 (2020 est.) in an area of 451.70 km^{2}. The municipality was formed in 1997 from part of the municipality Pedro Osório.

== Bounding municipalities ==
- Pedro Osório, southwest

== Mayors ==
List of Cerrito mayors
Nº	Name	Party	Election	Start	End	Ref
1	Adão Orlando Alves	PMDB	1996	January 1, 1997	January 1, 2001	
2	Nilo Gonçalves	PMDB	2000	January 1, 2001	January 1, 2005	
3	Adão Orlando Alves	PMDB	2004	January 1, 2005	January 1, 2009	
4	José Flávio Vieira	PP	2008	January 1, 2009	January 1, 2013	
4	José Flávio Vieira	PP	2012	January 1, 2013	January 1, 2017	
5	Douglas da Silveira	PP	2016	January 1, 2017	January 1, 2021	
5	Douglas da Silveira	PP	2020	January 1, 2021	Incumbent	

== See also ==
- List of municipalities in Rio Grande do Sul
