= Taim Ecological Station =

- Estação Ecológica do Taim
- IUCN category Ia (strict nature reserve)
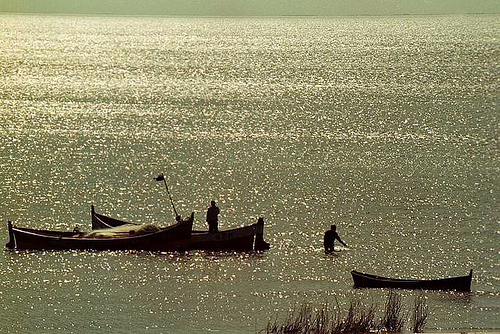
- Lagoa Mirim—Merín Lagoon, near the Taim Ecological Station

- Location within Brazil
- Coordinates: 32°32′S 52°32′W
- Area: 10,939 hectares (27,030 acres)
- Designation: ecological station
- Created: 21 July 1986

Ramsar Wetland
- Designated: 22 March 2017
- Reference no.: 2298

The Taim Ecological Station (Portuguese: Estação Ecológica do Taim) is a federally-administered ecological station in the state of Rio Grande do Sul, Brazil.

== Location ==
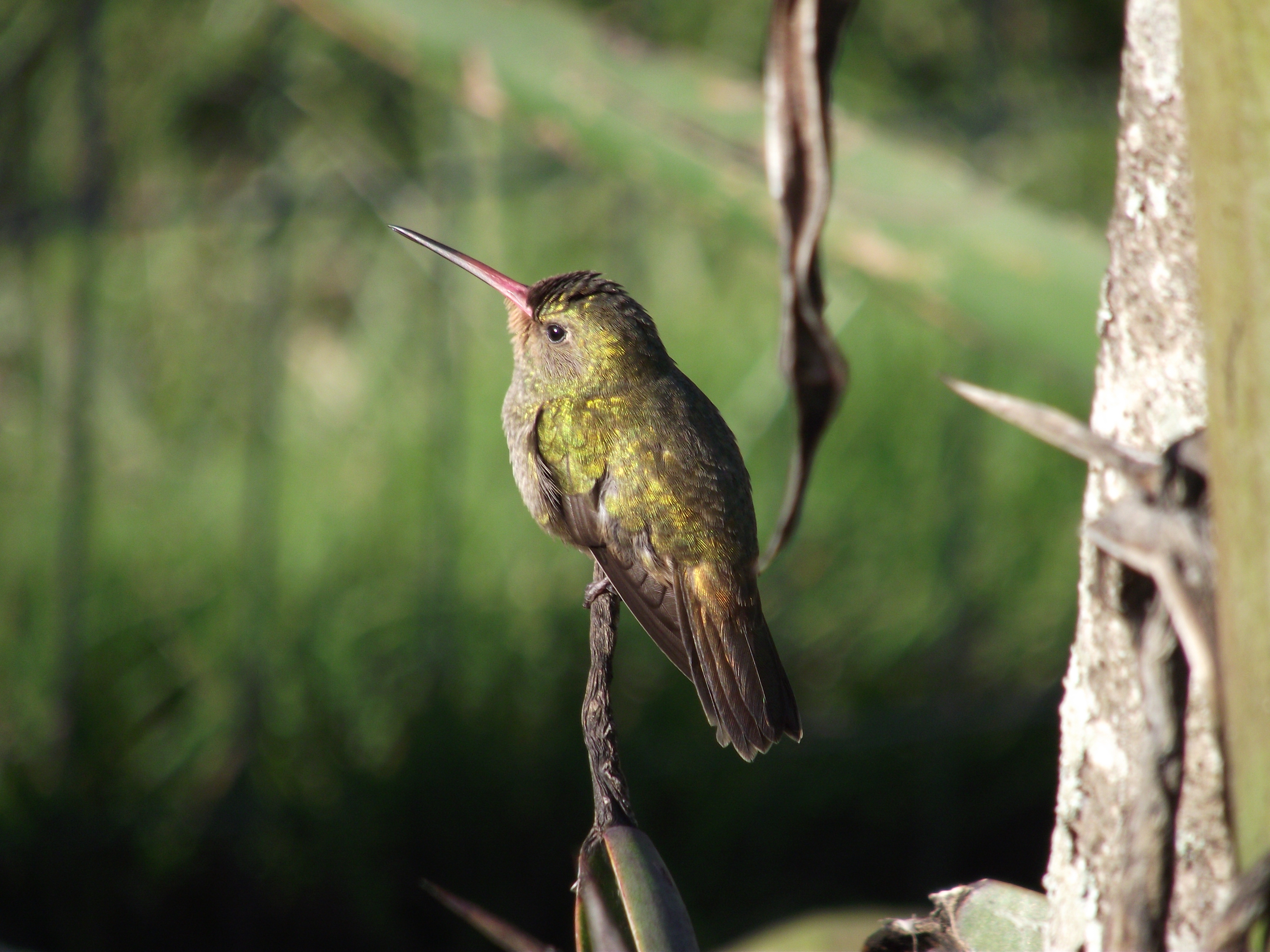
A gilded sapphire near the Taim Ecological Station.

The coastal marine ecological station, which has an area of 10,939 hectares (27,030 acres), was established on 21 July 1986. It is administered by the Chico Mendes Institute for Biodiversity Conservation. Taim Ecological Station is located in part of the Rio Grande and Santa Vitória do Palmar municipalities, in the southern state of Rio Grande do Sul, Brazil. The station is located in a narrow land strip between the Atlantic Ocean and the Lagoon Mirim. The BR-471 road crosses the reserve in the longitudinal direction, where the entrance to the ecological station is located.

== Environment ==
The coastal plateau in Rio Grande do Sul features areas of great value in the environment of the extreme south of Brazil and has formed as a result of the advance and retreat of the sea. The Taim wetlands contains diverse ecosystems, in lagunal and marine beaches, lagoons, swamps, grasslands and dune ranges and fields. Due to its diverse ecosystems, many species of animals, such as rufous hornero, turtles, tuco-tucos, capybaras, coypus, broad-snouted caimans and a considerable number of birds are found here. The flora is also very diverse, featuring Ficus, Erythrina crista-galli, Tibouchina, orchids, Bromelia, cacti, rushes and water hyacinths.

== Conservation ==
The Ecological Station was a "strict nature reserve" under IUCN protected area category Ia. The purpose is to conserve nature and support scientific research.

== Sources ==
- Esec do Taim (in Portuguese), Chico Mendes Institute for Biodiversity Conservation
- Unidade de Conservação: Estação Ecológica do Taim (in Portuguese), MMA: Ministério do Meio Ambiente
