= Microregion of Litoral Lagunar =

Coordinates: 32°02′06″S 52°05′56″W

Litoral Lagunar
- Micro-region
- Country: Brazil
- State: Rio Grande do Sul
- Mesoregion: Sudeste Rio-Grandense
- Municipalities: 4

Area
  - Total: 9,380 km^{2} (3,620 sq mi)

The Litoral Lagunar Microregion (Microrregião do Litoral Lagunar) is a microregion in the southern part of the state of Rio Grande do Sul, Brazil. Its total area is 9,379.518 km².

== Municipalities ==
The microregion consists of the following municipalities:

- Chuí
- Rio Grande
- Santa Vitória do Palmar
- São José do Norte
