= Capão Alto =

- Municipality
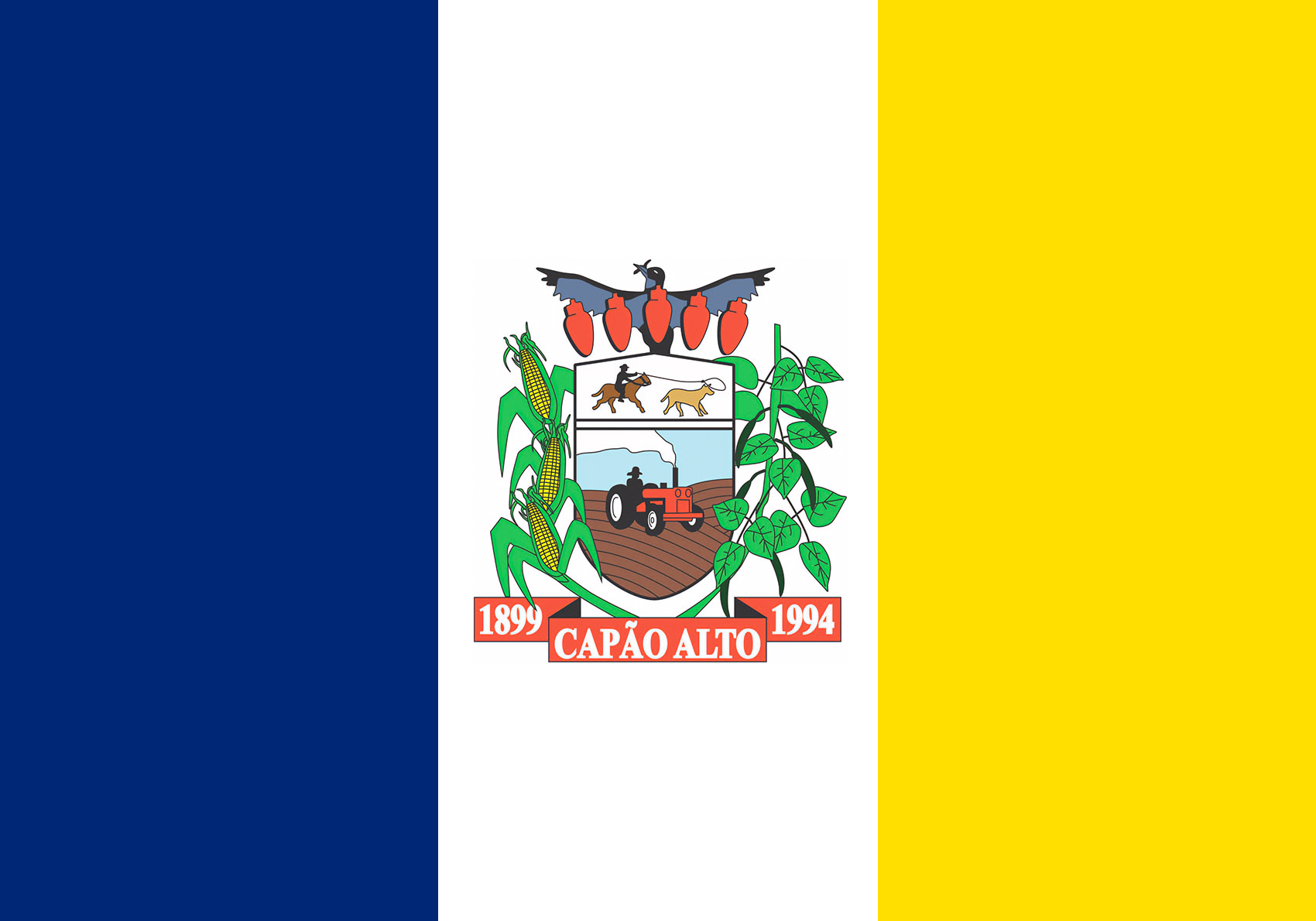
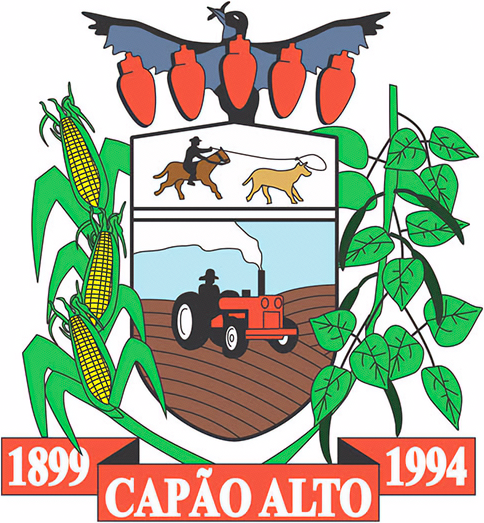
- Flag Coat of arms

- Location in Brazil
- Coordinates: 27.9369°S 50.5119°W
- Country: Brazil
- Region: South
- State: Santa Catarina
- Mesoregion: Serrana

Population (2020)
  - Total: 2,496
- Time zone: UTC -3
- Website: www.capaoalto.sc.gov.br

Capão Alto is a municipality in the state of Santa Catarina in the South region of Brazil.

== See also ==
- List of municipalities in Santa Catarina
