= Tacuarí River =

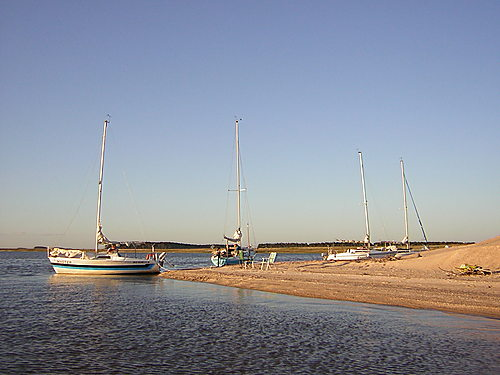

Location
- Country: Uruguay
- Department: Cerro Largo Department, Treinta y Tres

Physical characteristics
- Source
  - location: Cuchilla Grande
  - elevation: 103 metres (338 ft)
- Mouth
  - location: Lagoon Mirim
  - elevation: 0 metres (0 ft)
- Length: 230 km (140 mi)
- Basin size: 3,600 km^{2} (1,400 sq mi)

The Tacuarí River is a river in Cerro Largo Department, Uruguay. It has its source in the Cuchilla Grande in Cerro Largo and runs southeast to the Treinta y Tres Department where it flows into the Lagoon Mirim.

Its river basin covers approximately 3600 km². Waters deriving from this river are primarily used for irrigation in the region's agriculture interest.

== Etymology ==
Tacuarí is an herb that grows along the shorelines of the river that is used to prepare mate.

== See also ==
- List of rivers of Uruguay
