= Metropolitan Porto Alegre =

Coordinates: 30.0328°S 51.2300°W

Metropolitana de Porto Alegre
- Mesoregion
- Country: Brazil
- State: Rio Grande do Sul

Area
  - Total: 29,734.98 km^{2} (11,480.74 sq mi)

Population (2005)
  - Total: 5,168,413
  - Density: 173.8159/km^{2} (450.1812/sq mi)

Metropolitan Porto Alegre (Portuguese: Metropolitana de Porto Alegre) is one of the seven Mesoregions of the state of Rio Grande do Sul in Brazil. It consists of 98 municipalities, grouped in 6 Microregions:

- Camaquã
- Gramado-Canela
- Montenegro
- Osório
- Porto Alegre
- São Jerônimo
