= São Lourenço do Sul =

Municipality of Rio Grande do Sul, Brazil

- Municipality
- Flag Coat of arms

- Location within Rio Grande do Sul

- Location in Brazil
- Coordinates: 31°22′02.14″S 51°58′46.37″W
- Country: Brazil
- Region: South
- State: Rio Grande do Sul
- Founded: 26 April 1884

Government
  - Mayor: Rudinei Harter (PDT); (2017–2020)

Area
  - Total: 2,036.125 km^{2} (786.152 sq mi)

Population (2020)
  - Total: 43,540
  - Density: 21.38/km^{2} (55.38/sq mi)
- Time zone: UTC−3 (BRT)
- Postal Code: 96170-000
- Website: http://www.saolourencodosul.rs.gov.br/

São Lourenço do Sul is a Brazilian municipality in the state of Rio Grande do Sul. The municipality had 43,111 inhabitants in the last Census (2010). Its population in 2020 was estimated in 43,540 inhabitants. It is located at the west bank of the big lagoon Lagoa dos Patos.

The municipality contains part of the 7,993-hectare (19,750-acre) Camaquã State Park, created in 1975.

== See also ==
- List of municipalities in Rio Grande do Sul
