= Pedro Osório =

Municipality of Rio Grande do Sul, Brazil

- Town
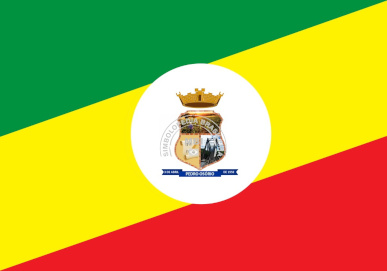
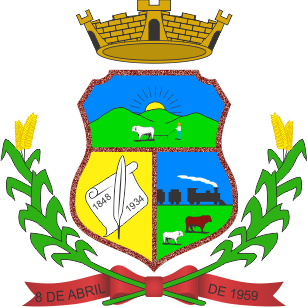
- Flag Coat of arms

- Map of the state of Rio Grande do Sul, Brazil highlighting Pedro Osório
- Coordinates: 31°51′51″S 52°49′24″W
- Country: Brazil
- Region: South
- State: Rio Grande do Sul
- Micro-region: Pelotas
- Founded: April 3, 1959

Area
  - Total: 608.79 km^{2} (235.06 sq mi)
- Elevation: 31 m (102 ft)

Population (2020)
  - Total: 7,706
  - Density: 12.66/km^{2} (32.78/sq mi)
- Demonym: Pedro-osoriense
- Time zone: UTC−3 (BRT)
- Website: www.pedroosorio.rs.gov.br

Pedro Osório is a Brazilian municipality in the southeastern part of the state of Rio Grande do Sul. The population is 7,706 (2020 est.) in an area of 608.79 km^{2}. The municipality was founded on April 3, 1958 from parts of the municipalities of Canguçú and Arroio Grande. Cerrito was separated in 1997.

The municipality is by the Piratini River. Its population is largely of Italian and Lebanese descent.

== Bounding municipalities ==
- Arroio Grande
- Cerrito
- Herval
- Pelotas
- Piratini

== See also ==
- List of municipalities in Rio Grande do Sul
