= Xangri-lá =

Municipality of Rio Grande do Sul, Brazil

- Municipality
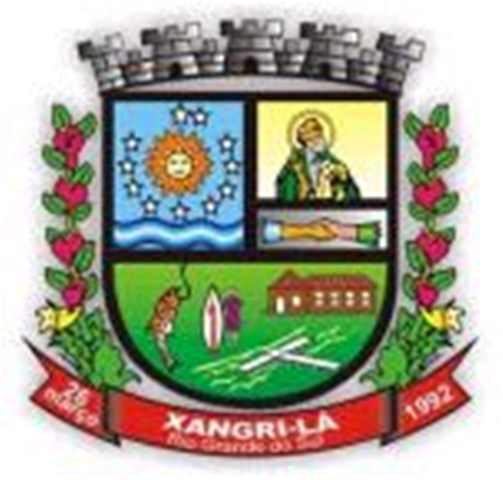
- Flag Coat of arms

- Location within Rio Grande do Sul

- Location in Brazil
- Coordinates: 29°48′03″S 50°02′38″W
- Country: Brazil
- State: Rio Grande do Sul

Population (2020)
  - Total: 16,775
- Time zone: UTC−3 (BRT)

Xangri-lá is a Municipality located on the south coast of Brazil, in the state Rio Grande do Sul. It is 134 kilometers from Porto Alegre, the state capital.

== See also ==
- List of municipalities in Rio Grande do Sul
