= Sudeste Rio-Grandense =

Coordinates: 31.7719°S 52.3428°W

- Mesoregion
- Country: Brazil
- State: Rio Grande do Sul

Area
  - Total: 42,539.66 km^{2} (16,424.65 sq mi)

Population (2005)
  - Total: 942,938
  - Density: 22.1661/km^{2} (57.4099/sq mi)

Sudeste Rio-Grandense (Southeast of Rio Grande) is one of the seven Mesoregions of the state of Rio Grande do Sul in Brazil. It consists of 25 municipalities, grouped in four Microregions:

- Jaguarão
- Litoral Lagunar
- Pelotas
- Serras de Sudeste
