= Serras de Sudeste =

Dissected plateau in Rio Grande do Sul, Brazil

- Escudo Sul-Rio-Grandense
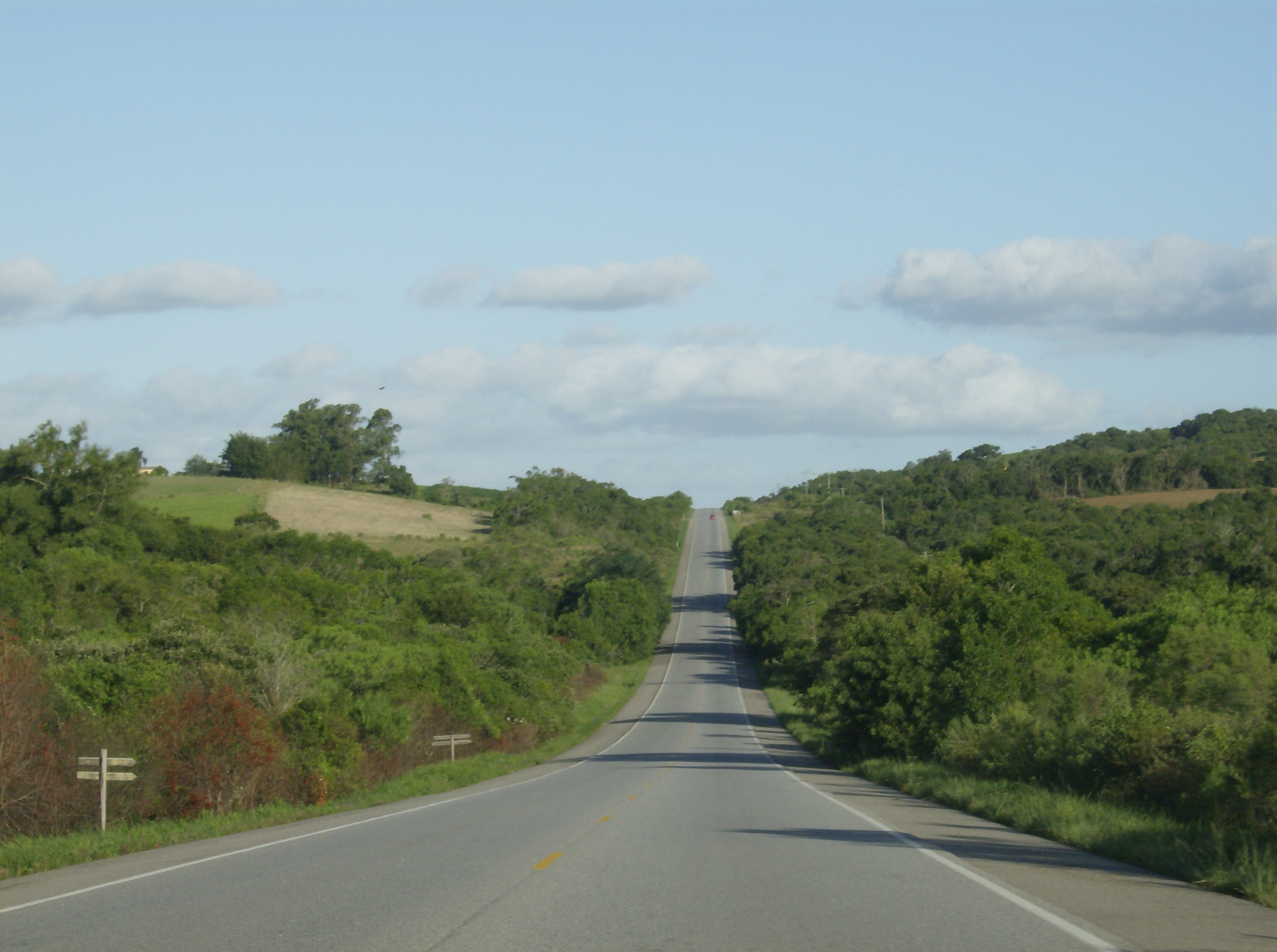
- Incline on the road BR-293, in the municipality of Cerrito

Highest point
- Peak: Cerro da Antena
- Elevation: 550 m (1,800 ft)
- Coordinates: 31°30′00″S 53°22′00″W

Naming
- English translation: Southeastern Mountain Ranges
- Language of name: Portuguese
- Pronunciation: Portuguese pronunciation: [ˈsɛʁɐz dʒi suˈdɛstʃi]

Geography
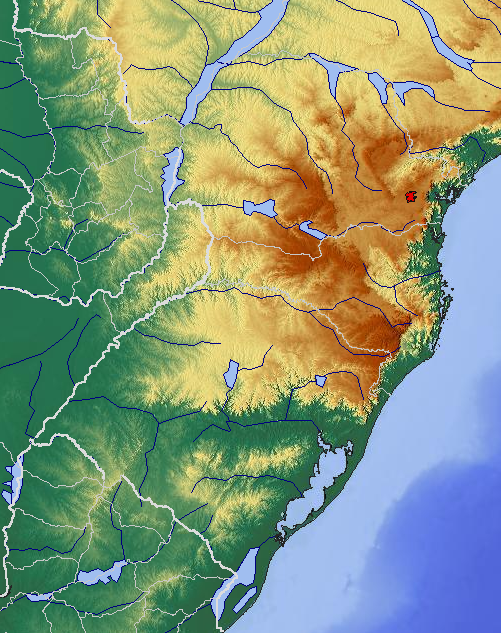
- Topographic map of the Southern Region, Brazil. This plateau is located west of Lagoa dos Patos.
- Country: Brazil
- State: Rio Grande do Sul

Geology
- Rock age: Precambrian
- Mountain type(s): Dissected plateau (granite, gneiss)

Serras de Sudeste (English: Southeastern Mountain Ranges) is a dissected plateau, also named Planalto Dissecado de Sudeste (Southeastern Dissected Plateau) or Escudo Sul-Rio-Grandense (Shield of Rio Grande do Sul), located in the southeastern portion of Rio Grande do Sul state in southernmost Brazil, near Uruguay.

== Geography ==
=== Topography ===
This plateau has hills and hillocks covered by grasslands, known as coxilhas (cuchillas in Spanish), whose highest levels do not exceed 600 metres (1,970 feet) in altitude. This plateau was formed in Precambrian time, divided by the Camaquã River in two main units, Serra de Herval and Serra dos Tapes. This region has a triangular area between the cities of Porto Alegre, Jaguarão and Dom Pedrito, approximately.

It is an old plateau, whose tabular relief is preserved only in areas between some rivers.

There are three municipalities, in this region, whose their urban areas are situated above 400 metres (1,312 feet) of elevation: Caçapava do Sul, with 444 metres (1,456 feet), Pinheiro Machado, with 436 metres (1,430 feet), and Encruzilhada do Sul, with 432 metres (1,417 feet). With an urban area above 300 metres (984 feet) of elevation, there are the municipalities of Canguçu, with 386 metres (1,266 feet), Piratini, with 349 metres (1,145 feet), and Santana da Boa Vista, with 306 metres (1,004 feet).

The highest point in this range of hills (and in all the southern zone of the state) is Cerro da Antena, with an elevation of 550 m (1,804 ft), located between the municipalities of Cerro Grande do Sul and Camaquã.

=== Climate ===
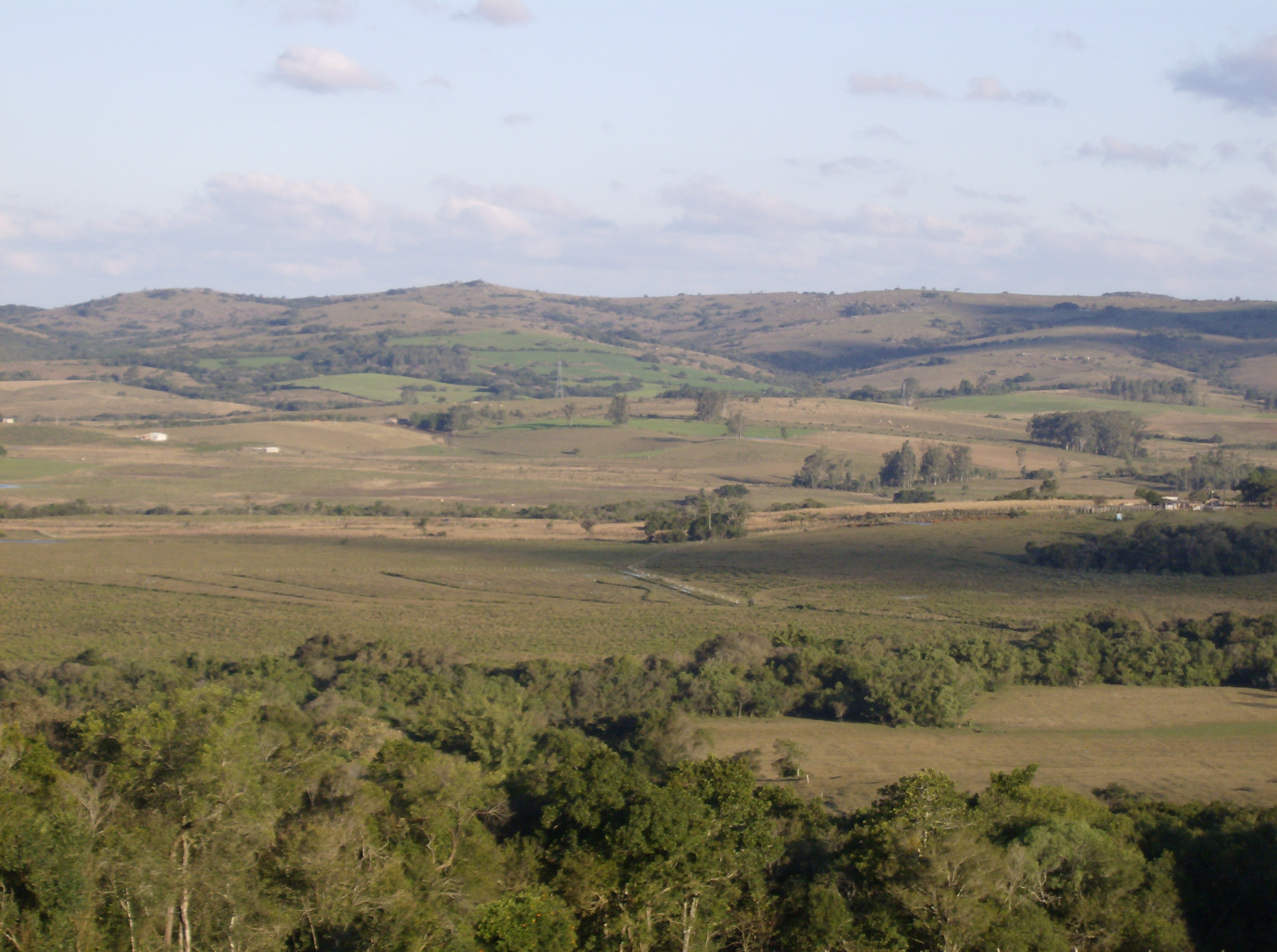
Coxilhas (hills) in Morro Redondo, Rio Grande do Sul state, Brazil.

The climate of this region is subtropical (Cfa), bordering on an oceanic climate (Cfb), with mild to warm summers and cool winters, with frequent frosts and fog. The rainfall is well distributed throughout the year, but occasional droughts can occur and snow is uncommon (snow flurries usually occur once or twice a decade). The last significant snowfalls occurred on September 4, 2006, and on September 5, 2008, in some municipalities of the region.

The average annual temperature in Serras de Sudeste is between 16 °C (60.8 °F) and 18 °C (64.4 °F), and the average annual precipitation is about 1,400 mm (55.11 in). In the areas above 300 metres (984 feet) of elevation, the hottest month, January, has an average temperature of 21 °C (69.8 °F), and the coldest month, July, has an average of 11 °C (51.8 °F). In the lower areas of this plateau, the hottest month has an average between 22 °C (71.6 °F) and 24 °C (75.2 °F), and the coldest month has an average temperature between 11 °C and 12 °C (53.6 °F).

Climate data for Canguçu (406 m (1,332 ft))
Month	Jan	Feb	Mar	Apr	May	Jun	Jul	Aug	Sep	Oct	Nov	Dec	Year
Mean daily maximum °C (°F)	27.8 (82.0)	27.1 (80.8)	25.4 (77.7)	21.9 (71.4)	18.9 (66.0)	16.7 (62.1)	16.7 (62.1)	17.6 (63.7)	19.2 (66.6)	21.7 (71.1)	24.2 (75.6)	25.8 (78.4)	21.9 (71.5)
Daily mean °C (°F)	22.3 (72.1)	21.7 (71.1)	20.3 (68.5)	16.9 (62.4)	14.3 (57.7)	12.2 (54.0)	12.0 (53.6)	12.9 (55.2)	14.5 (58.1)	16.7 (62.1)	18.7 (65.7)	20.1 (68.2)	16.9 (62.4)
Mean daily minimum °C (°F)	16.8 (62.2)	16.4 (61.5)	15.3 (59.5)	12.0 (53.6)	9.8 (49.6)	7.8 (46.0)	7.4 (45.3)	8.2 (46.8)	9.9 (49.8)	11.7 (53.1)	13.3 (55.9)	14.5 (58.1)	11.9 (53.5)
Average precipitation mm (inches)	120 (4.7)	136 (5.4)	119 (4.7)	104 (4.1)	114 (4.5)	142 (5.6)	140 (5.5)	146 (5.7)	143 (5.6)	127 (5.0)	97 (3.8)	88 (3.5)	1,476 (58.1)
Source: Climate-data.org

=== Vegetation ===
This plateau is located in the ecoregion of the Uruguayan savanna, and consists mostly of grasslands, with low and herbaceous vegetation (pampa) and areas of palm savanna, gallery forests along rivers, and enclaves of submontane forest. Small groves of cultivated trees by the silviculture (Babylon willow, eucalyptus, pine, cedar, cypress, acacia, poplar and platanus) and native trees (Brazilian cherry, butia, Brazilian pepper, cockspur coral tree and araucaria angustifolia) are also found.

=== Fauna ===
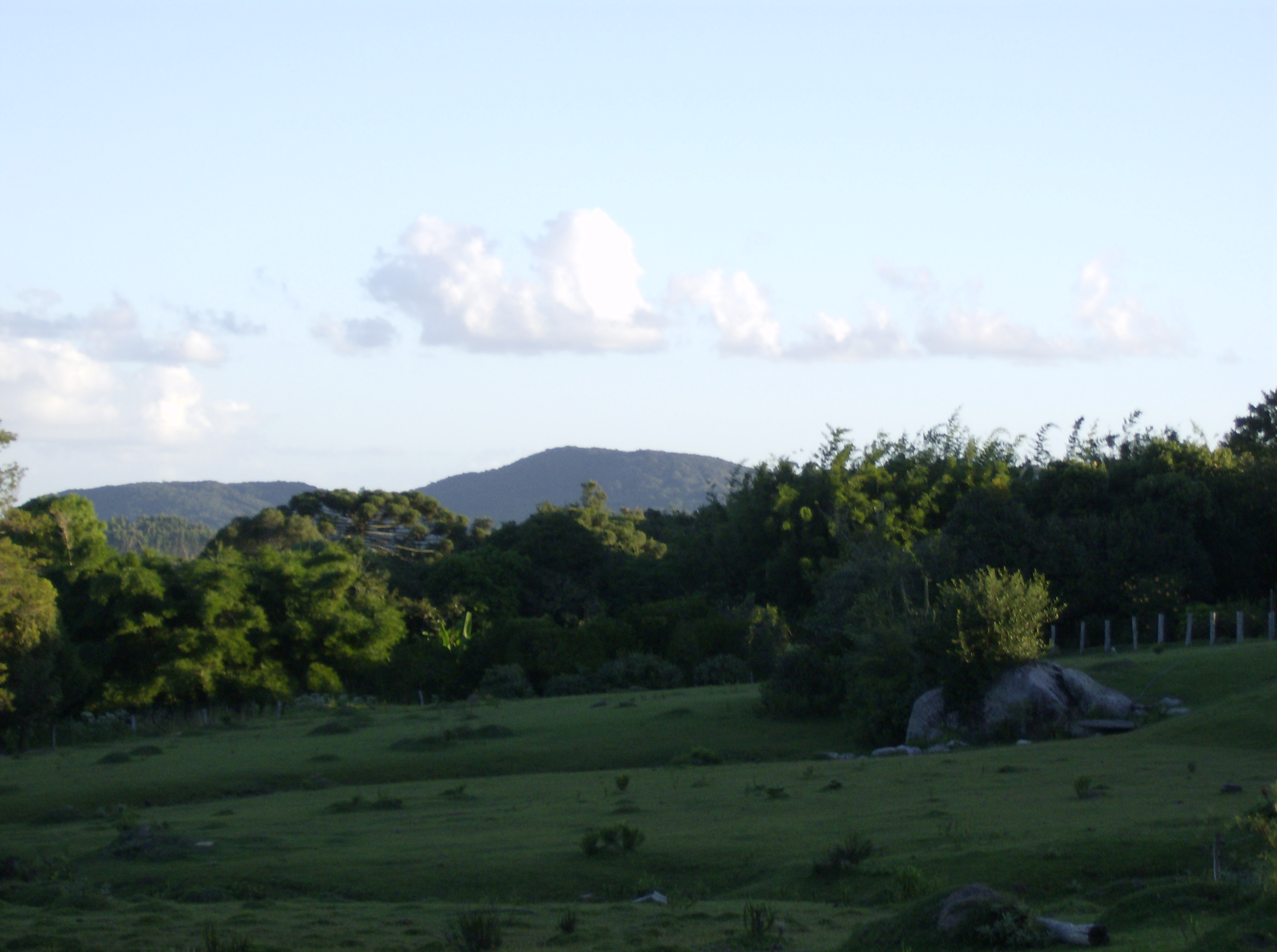
Hilly landscape in Arroio do Padre

Grazing mammals of the hill range include the Pampas deer (Ozotoceros bezoarticus), the gray brocket or guazuvirá deer (Mazama gouazoubira), the capybara (Hydrochoerus hydrochaeris), the world's largest living rodent, the Molina's hog-nosed skunk and the Pampas fox (Lycalopex gymnocercus), and birds include the greater rhea (Rhea americana) and the red-winged tinamou (Rhynchotus rufescens). Jaguars, cougars and ocelots do not exist anymore in this area.

=== Hydrography ===
Serras de Sudeste is part of the watershed of the Camaquã River.

== Municipalities of the region ==
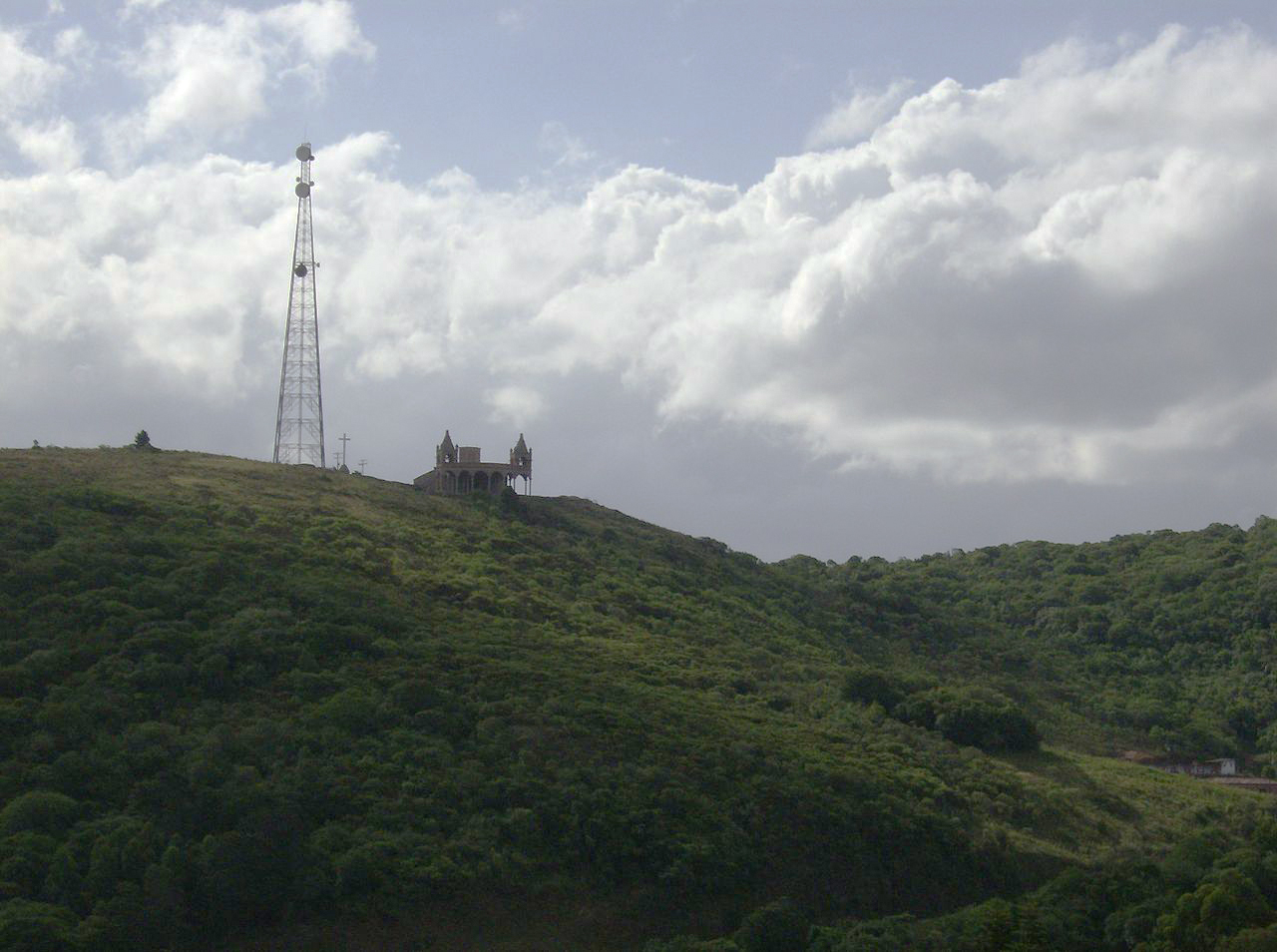
Hill near the urban area of Canguçu, with an altitude of 500 metres at the summit

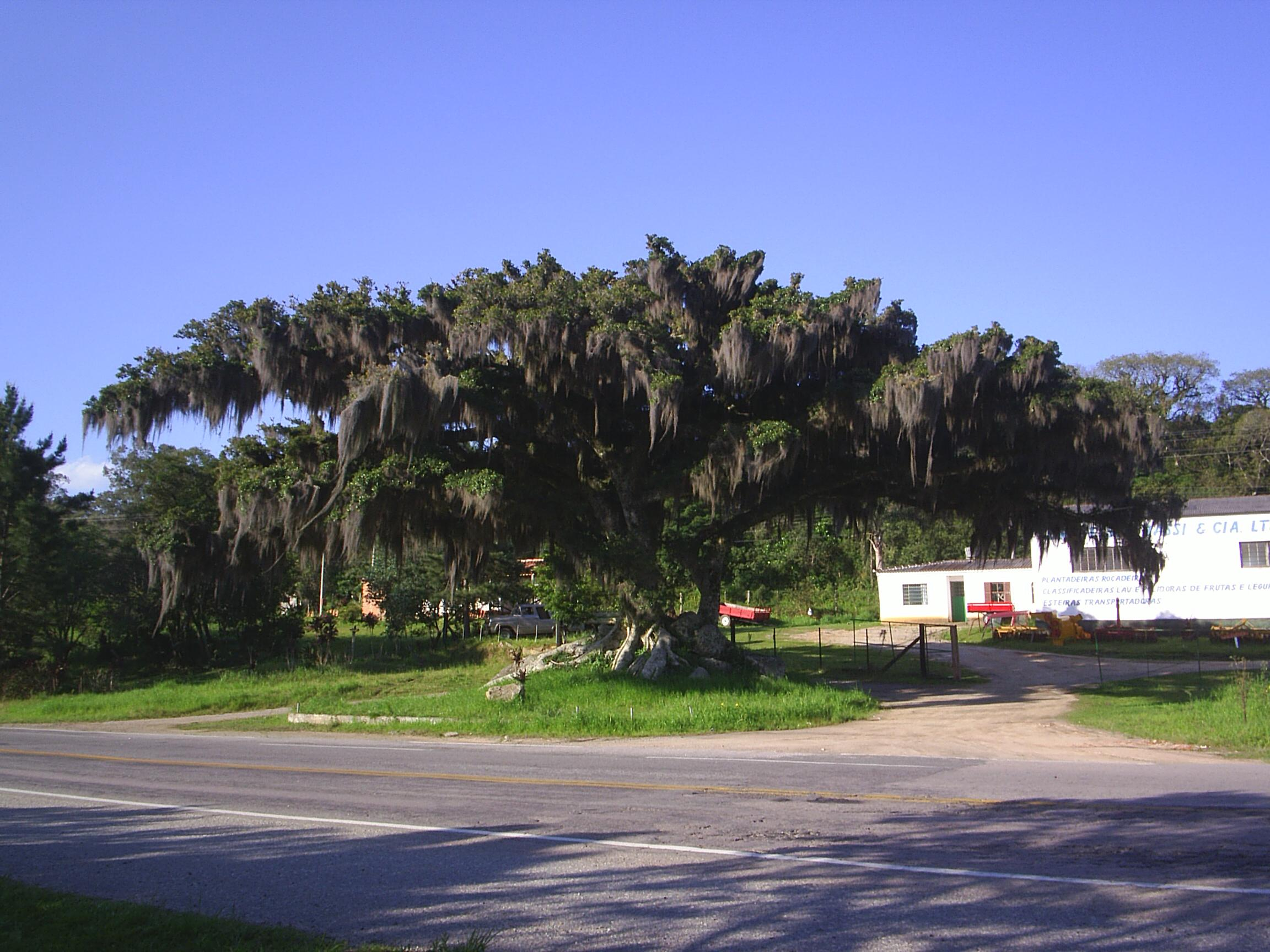
A ficus in the Cascata district, municipality of Pelotas

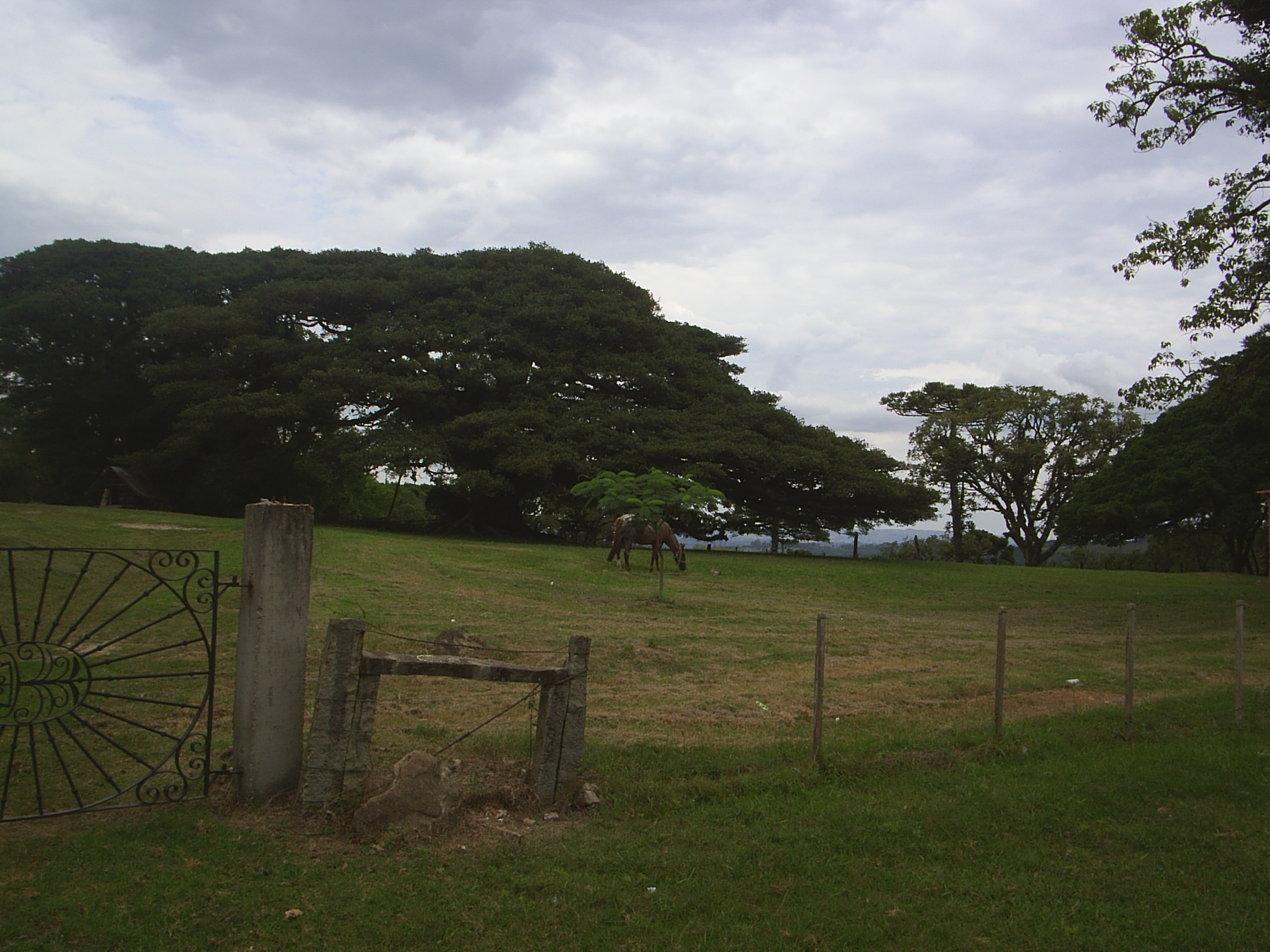
The countryside of Pelotas

- Aceguá
- Amaral Ferrador
- Arroio do Padre
- Bagé
- Caçapava do Sul
- Camaquã
- Candiota
- Canguçu
- Capão do Leão
- Cerrito
- Cerro Grande do Sul
- Chuvisca
- Cristal
- Dom Feliciano
- Dom Pedrito
- Encruzilhada do Sul
- Herval
- Hulha Negra
- Jaguarão
- Lavras do Sul
- Morro Redondo
- Pedras Altas
- Pedro Osório
- Pelotas
- Pinheiro Machado
- Piratini
- Santana da Boa Vista
- São Lourenço do Sul
- Turuçu

== Tourism ==
This region has been visited by many tourists due to the beautiful rural landscapes, with many inns among the hills. The city of Piratini, located in Serras de Sudeste, was the first capital of the Riograndense Republic, a former republic in the 19th century.

== Economy ==
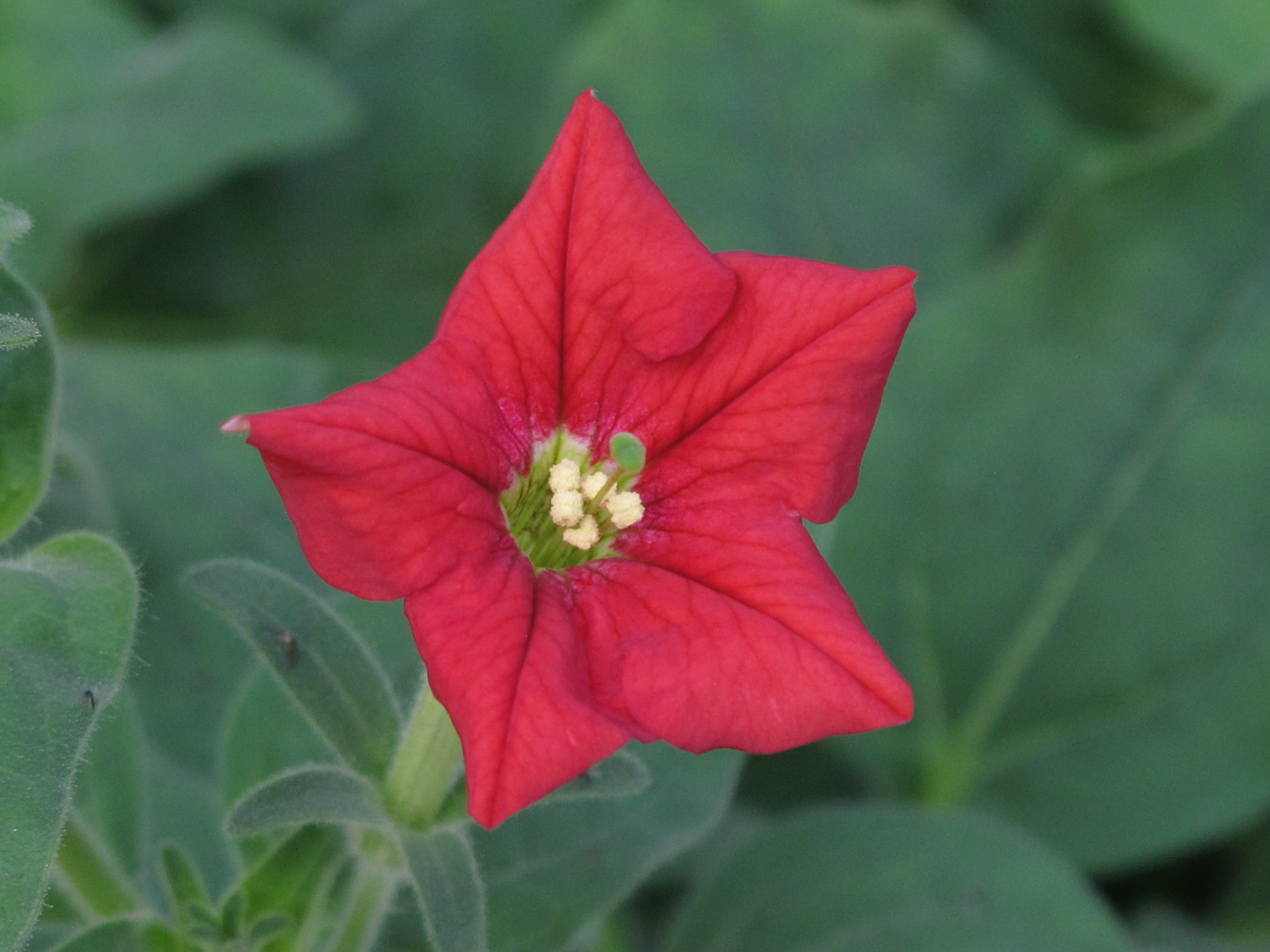
Petunia exserta, a rare member of the genus Petunia, endemic to this region.

The main economic activities of the region are: agriculture, animal husbandry, mining and viticulture, with production of wines of high quality, due to the characteristics of the soil and climate. Tourism is also economically significant.

The silviculture has had great economic importance, with the afforestation of grasslands with eucalyptus, pine and acacia, utilized in the logging industry.

== Highways ==
There are three federal highways in the region: BR-116, BR-392 and BR-293.

== See also ==
- Serras de Sudeste (micro-region)
- Brazilian Highlands
- Guiana Shield

== Bibliography ==
- Rosa, Mário (1985). Geografia de Pelotas [Geography of Pelotas] (in Portuguese). Pelotas: Federal University of Pelotas.
