= Microregion of Serras de Sudeste =

Coordinates: 30°30′43″S 53°29′27″W

Serras de Sudeste
- Micro-region
- Country: Brazil
- State: Rio Grande do Sul
- Mesoregion: Sudeste Rio-Grandense
- Municipalities: 8

Area
  - Total: 16,513 km^{2} (6,376 sq mi)

The Serras de Sudeste Microregion (Portuguese: Microrregião das Serras de Sudeste) is a microregion in the southern part of the state of Rio Grande do Sul, Brazil. It is named after a hill range (a plateau) named Serras de Sudeste, which means Southeastern Mountain Ranges. The area is 16,512.614 km².

== Municipalities ==
The microregion consists of the following municipalities:

- Amaral Ferrador
- Caçapava do Sul
- Candiota
- Encruzilhada do Sul
- Pedras Altas
- Pinheiro Machado
- Piratini
- Santana da Boa Vista
