= Caçapava do Sul =

Municipality of Rio Grande do Sul, Brazil

- Municipality
- Municipality of Caçapava do Sul
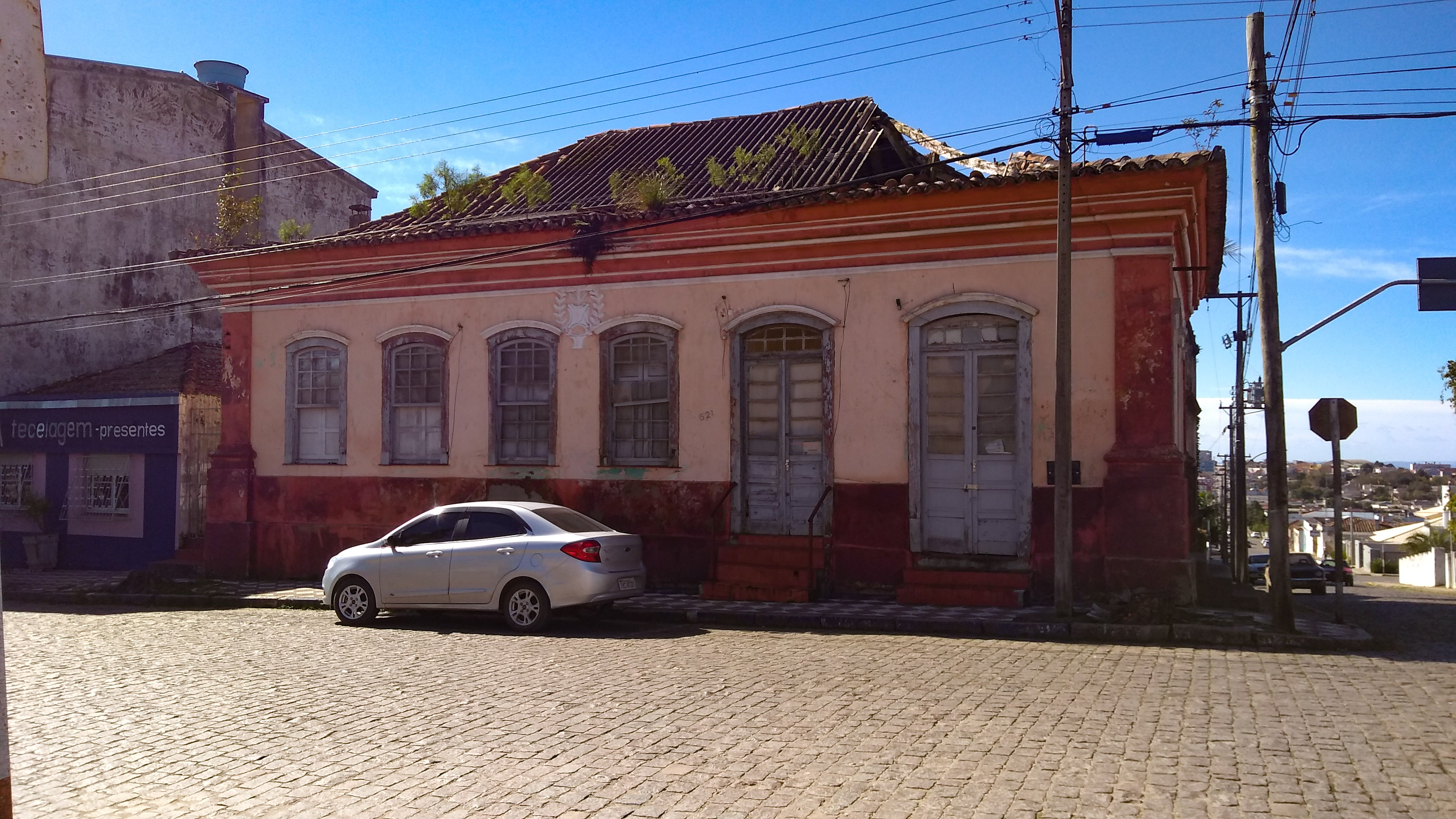
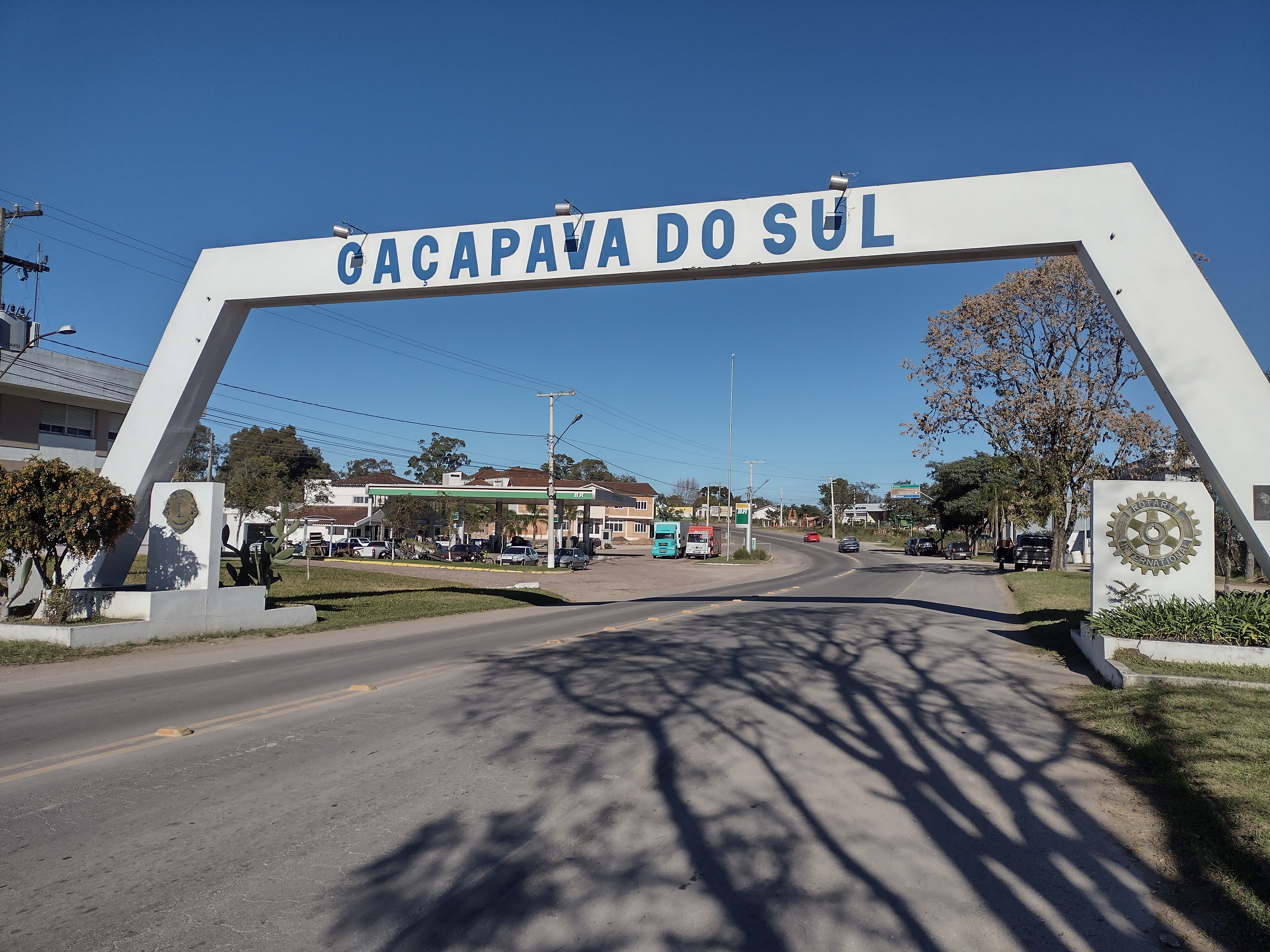
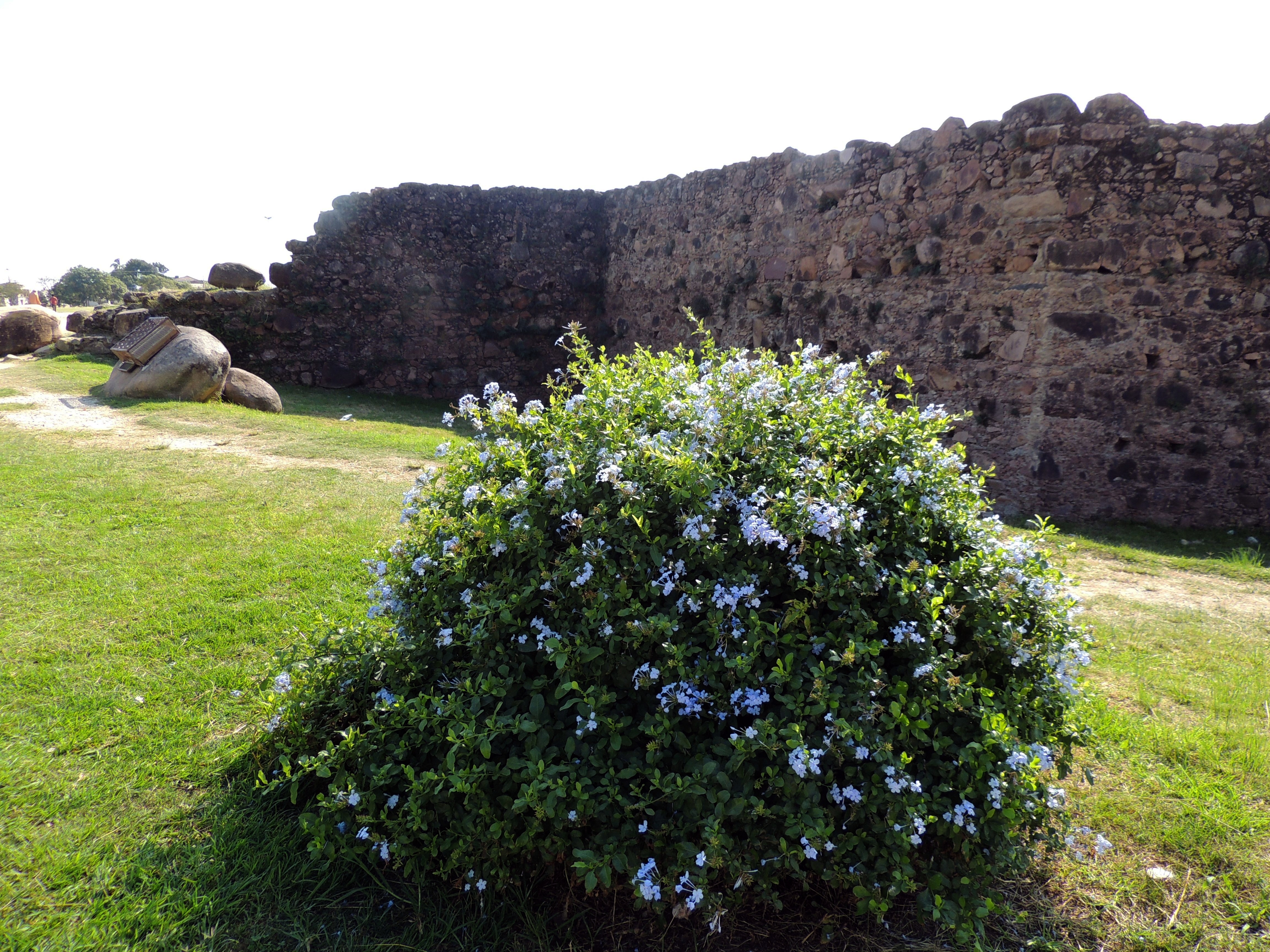
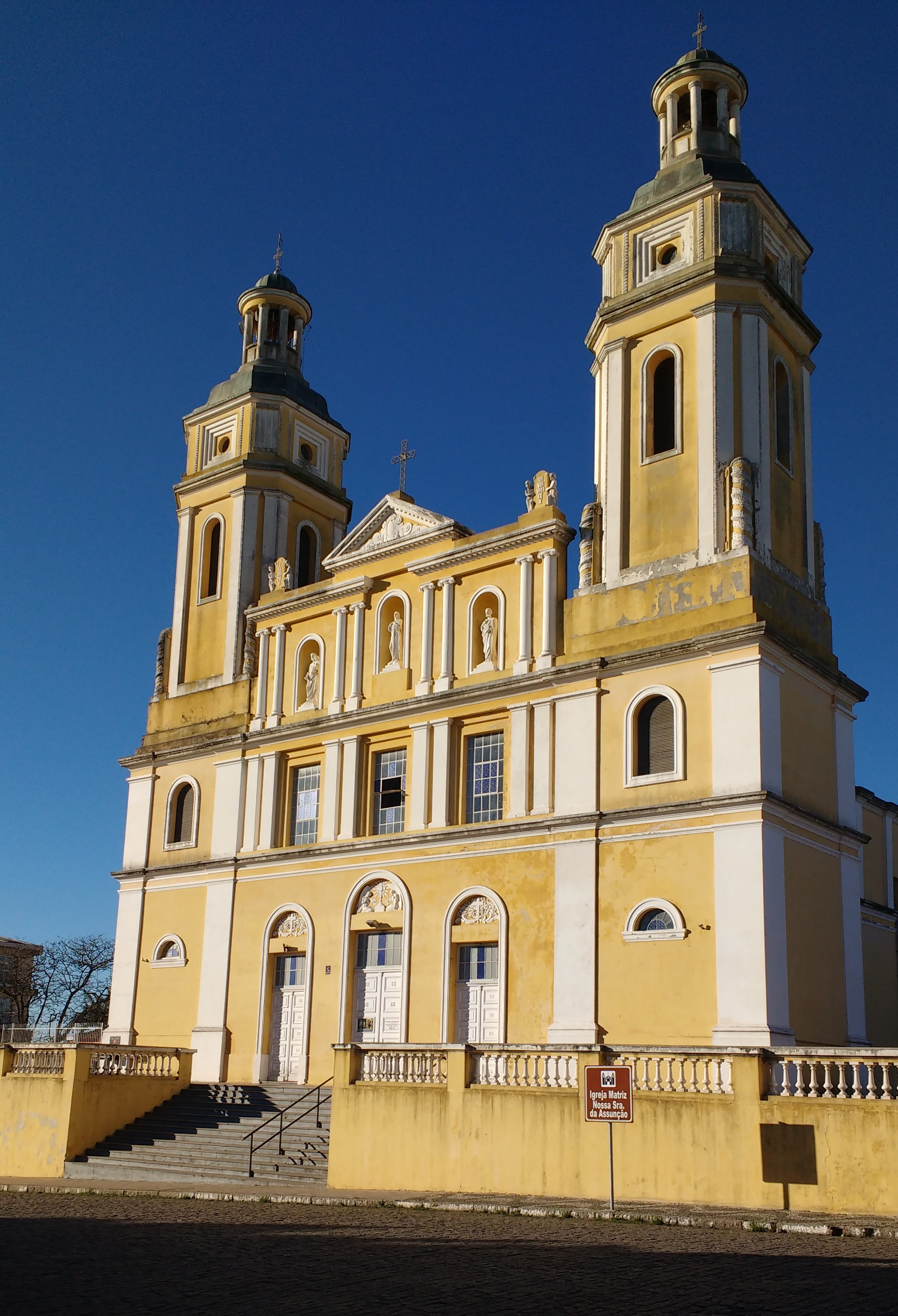
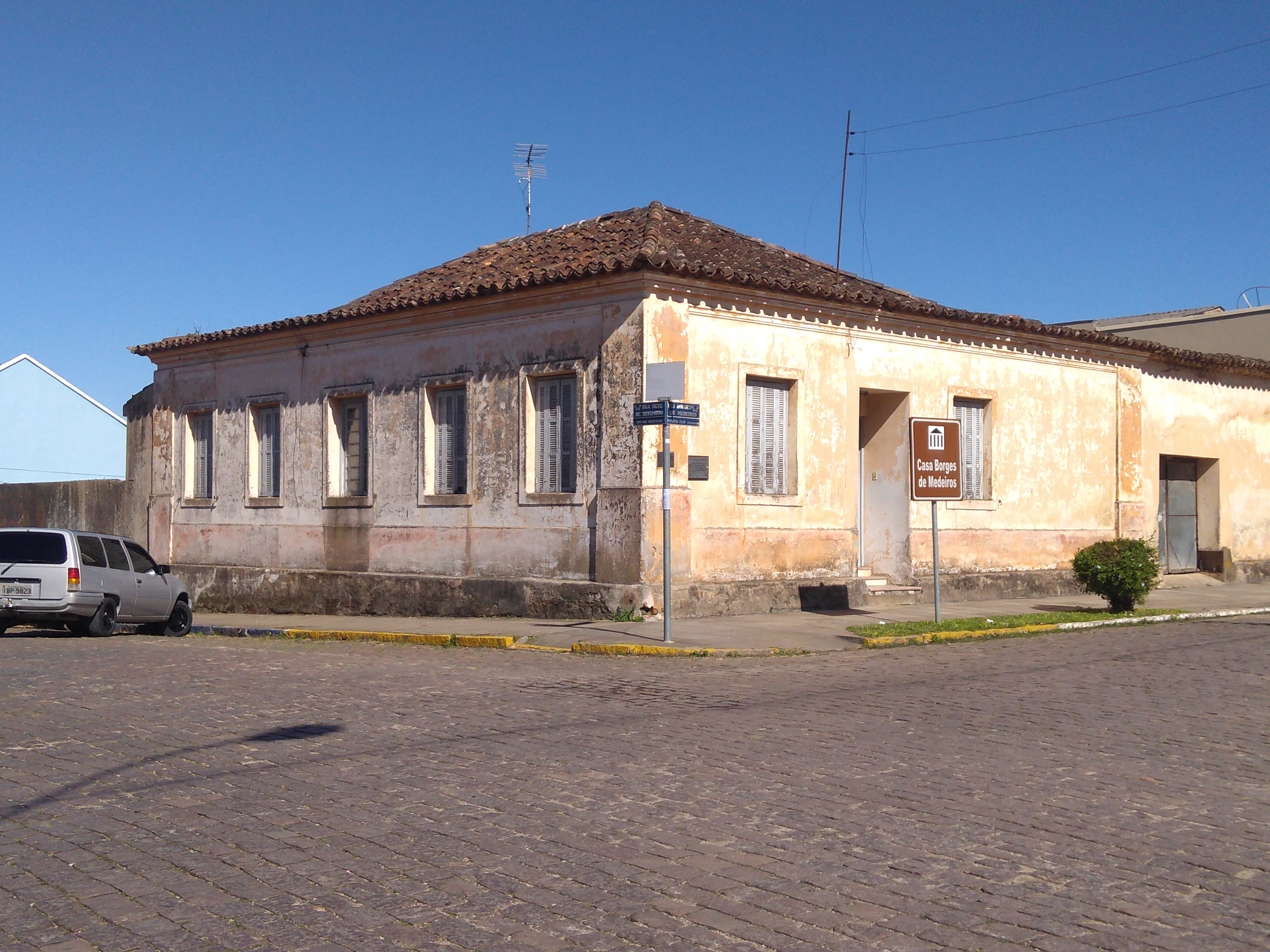
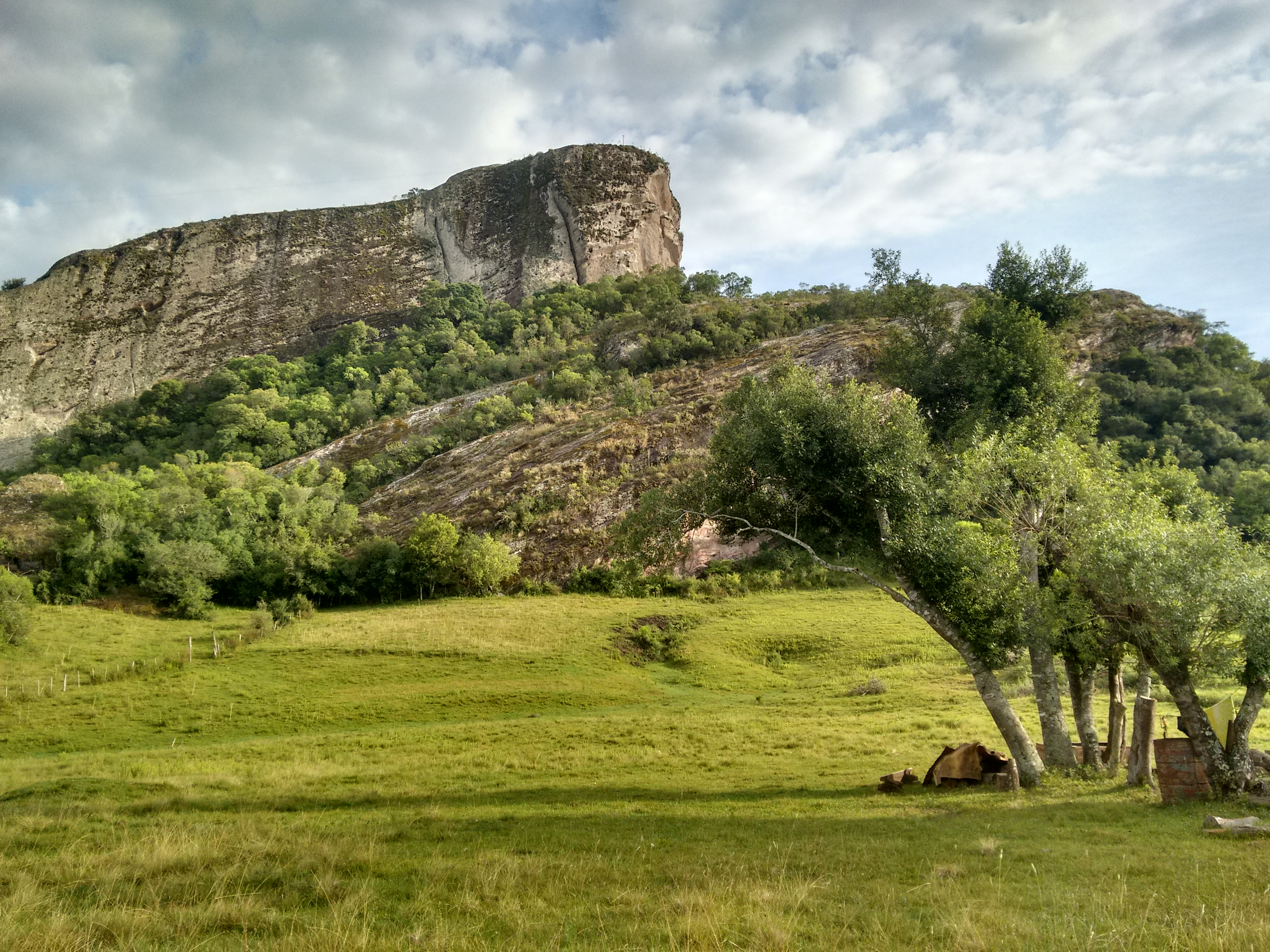
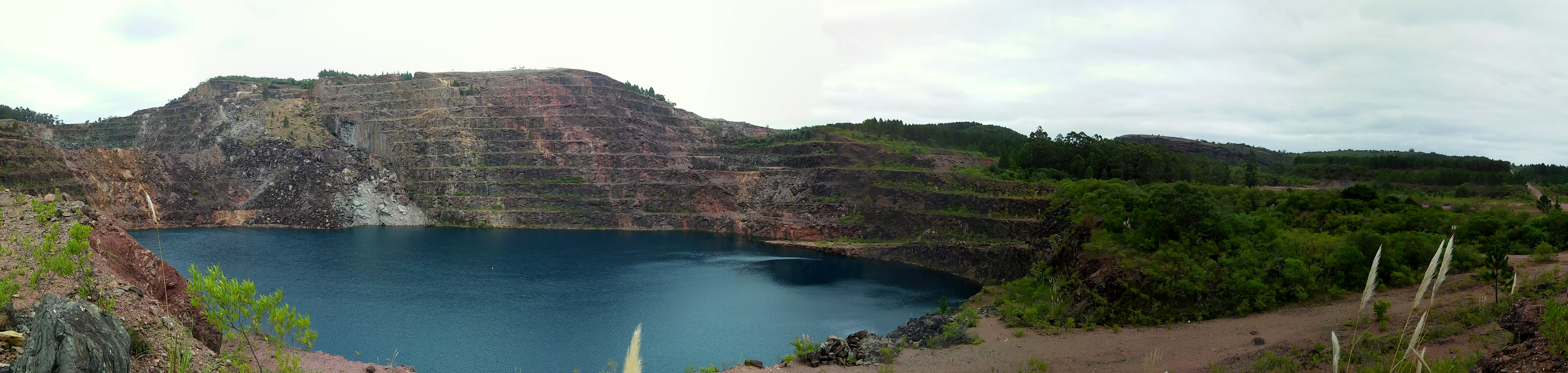

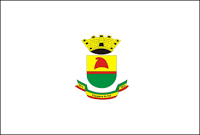
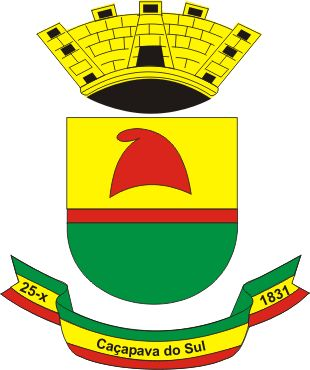
- Flag Coat of arms
- Motto: Caçapava não se entrega (Caçapava doesn't surrender)
- Location in Rio Grande do Sul
- Coordinates: 30°30′44″S 53°29′27″W
- Country: Brazil
- Region: South
- State: Rio Grande do Sul
- Meso-region: Sudeste Rio-Grandense
- Micro-region: Serras de Sudeste
- Founded: 25 October 1831

Government
  - Mayor: Giovani Amestoy da Silva (PDT)

Area
  - Total: 3,047.120 km^{2} (1,176.500 sq mi)
- Elevation: 444 m (1,457 ft)

Population (2020)
  - Total: 33,548
  - Density: 11.06/km^{2} (28.6/sq mi)
- Demonym: caçapavano
- Time zone: UTC−3 (BRT)
- Postal code: 96570
- Area code: (+55) 55
- HDI (2010): 0.704 – high
- Website: cacapava.rs.gov.br

Caçapava do Sul is a Brazilian municipality in the state of Rio Grande do Sul, located on the banks of the Camaquã River. As of 2020, the city has an estimated population of 33,548. It was the 2nd capital of the Piratini Republic from 1839 to 1840.

The economy depends primarily on the mining industry. Caçapava do Sul produces 80% of the calcareous rock mined in Rio Grande do Sul. For many years it was Brazil's major producer of copper and is still an important center of copper mining.

A major deposit of copper ore was discovered in the 1940s by the CBC (Companhia Brasileira do Cobre / Brazilian Copper Company), under the direction of Brazilian industrialist and famous playboy Francisco "Baby" Pignatari. The area, about 5 kilometers (3.1 mi) from Caçapava, came to be known as the Minas do Camaquã (Camaquã Mines). This large operation contributed enormously to the town's economy and is still the site of operating copper mines, by such companies as Majestic Diamonds & Metals.

The area has several interesting natural formations. Nearby lies Pedra do Segredo (Stone of the Secret), a natural outcropping of stone that attracts mountain climbers and tourists from all over the state and elsewhere.

== Geography ==
The city is located at latitude 30º30'44"S and longitude 53º29'29"W, at an altitude of 444 meters (1,457 ft). It has a geographical area of 3,044.8 km^{2} (1,175.6 sq mi).

=== Nearby municipalities ===
- São Sepé
- Cachoeira do Sul
- Santana da Boa Vista
- Pinheiro Machado
- Bagé
- Lavras do Sul
- Vila Nova do Sul

== Historic and natural sites ==
- Pedra do Segredo (Stone of the Secret)
- Dom Pedro II Fort
- Cascata do Salso (Salso Waterfall)
- Minas do Camaquã (Camaquã Mines)
- Casa de Borges de Medeiros (Borges of Medeiros' House)
- House of Ulhôa Cintra (Portuguese: Casa dos Ministérios)
- Parish Church of Our Lady of the Assumption
- Guaritas (considered the 7th natural wonder of Rio Grande do Sul)

== See also ==
- List of municipalities in Rio Grande do Sul
- Siege of Caçapava
