= Amaral Ferrador =

Municipality in Rio Grande do Sul, Brazil

- Municipality
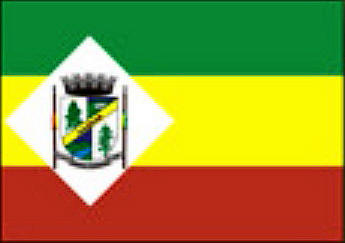
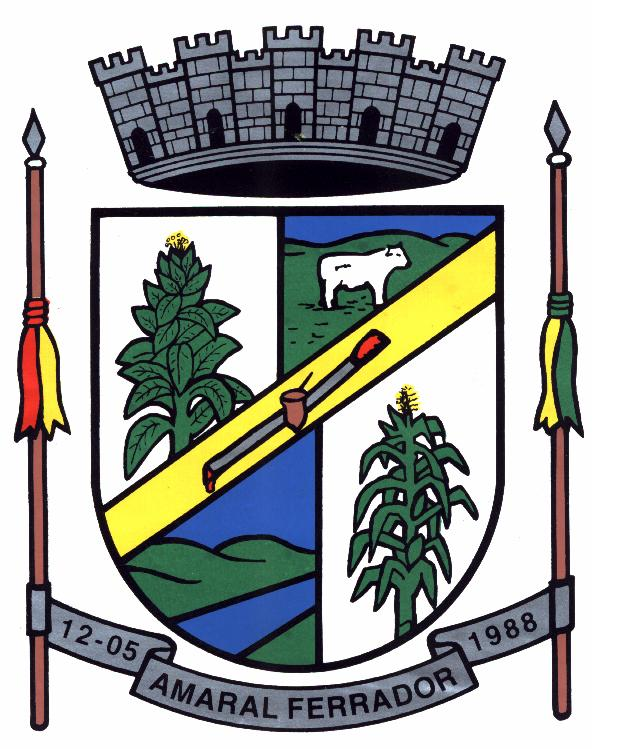
- Flag Coat of arms

- Location in Rio Grande do Sul state

- Location in Brazil
- Coordinates: 30°52′30″S 52°15′10″W
- Country: Brazil
- Region: South
- State: Rio Grande do Sul
- Mesoregion: Sudeste Rio-Grandense
- Microregion: Serras de Sudeste

Area
  - Total: 506.46 km^{2} (195.55 sq mi)
- Elevation: 140 m (460 ft)

Population (2020)
  - Total: 7,085
  - Density: 13.99/km^{2} (36.23/sq mi)
- Time zone: UTC−3 (BRT)
- Postal code: 96635-xxx
- Website: www.itacurubi.rs.gov.br

Amaral Ferrador (Portuguese: [a.maˈɾaw fe.ʁaˈdoʁ]) is a municipality in the state of Rio Grande do Sul, Brazil. The population is 7,085 (2020 est.) in an area of 506.46 km^{2}. It is situated on the Camaquã River.

== Economy ==
The main economical activities are trade, agriculture (maize, tobacco and beans) and livestock (cattle, sheep and pork).

== Demography ==
Its population consists of 60% Portuguese ancestry, 25% Polish ancestry and 15% Afro-Brazilians.

== Bounding municipalities ==
- Camaquã
- Canguçu
- Dom Feliciano
- Encruzilhada do Sul

== See also ==
- List of municipalities in Rio Grande do Sul
