= BR-293 (Brazil highway) =

Highway in Brazil

BR-293
- Osvaldo Aranha Highway
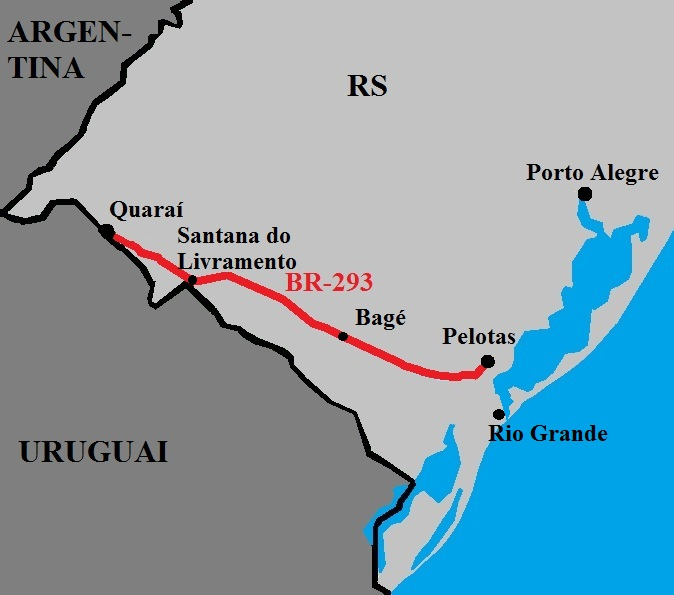

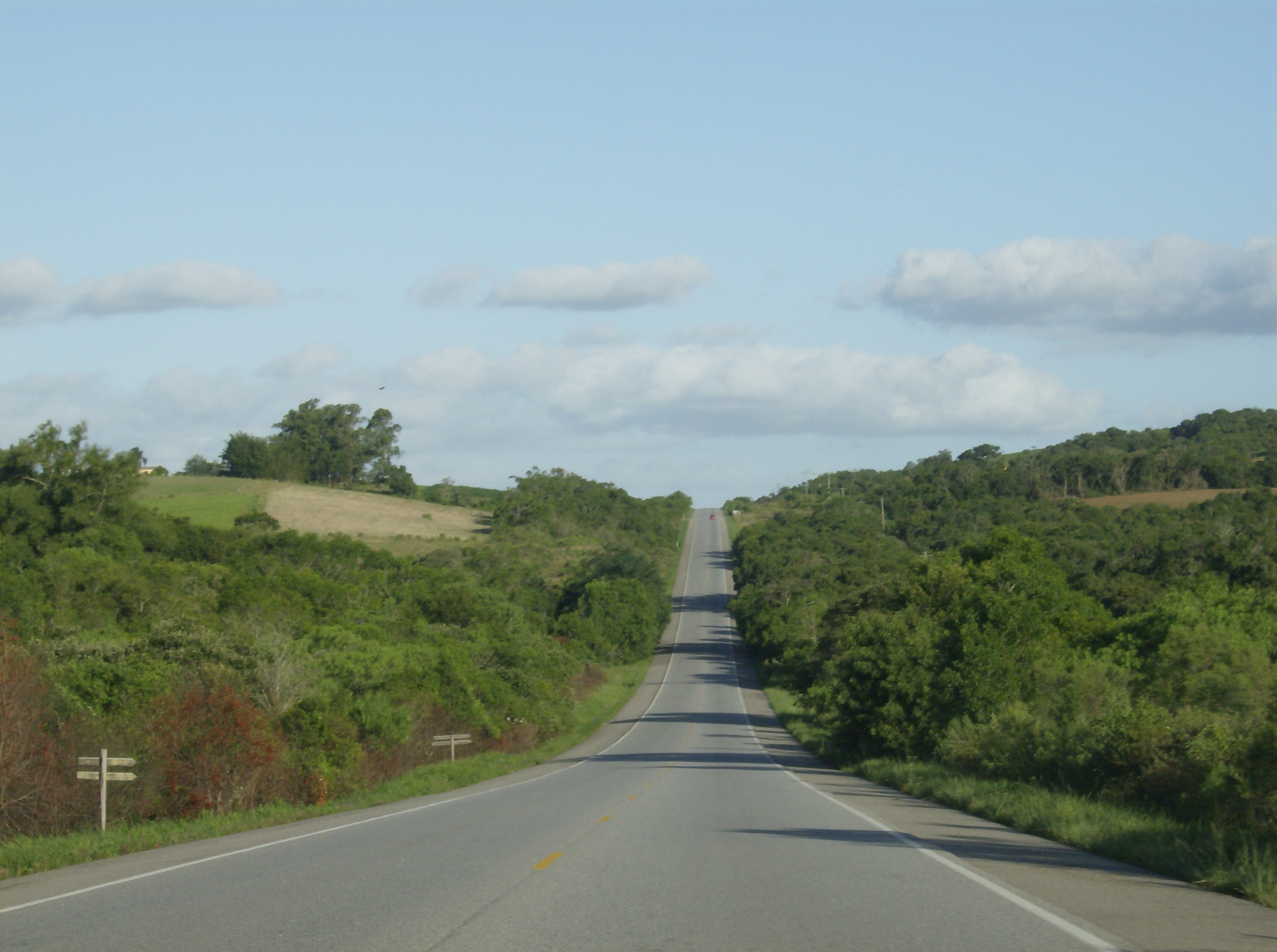
- Incline on the road BR-293, in the municipality of Cerrito

Route information
- Length: 535.7 km (332.9 mi)

Major junctions
- East end: Quaraí, Rio Grande do Sul
- RS-183 e BR-158 in Santana do Livramento, RS; RS-630 in Dom Pedrito, RS; BR-473 e BR-153 in Bagé, RS; RS-608 e RS-265 in Pinheiro Machado, RS; RS-702 in Piratini, RS; RS-706 in Cerrito, RS; BR-116 in Capão do Leão, RS
- West end: Pelotas, Rio Grande do Sul

Location
- Country: Brazil
- State: Rio Grande do Sul

Highway system
- Highways in Brazil; Federal; Rio Grande do Sul State Highways

The BR-293 is an east-west highway in the state of Rio Grande do Sul, Brazil. The highway connects Pelotas to Quaraí, crossing important cities in the southern tip of Brazil such as Bagé and Santana do Livramento. The highway measures 535.7 km.

== Economic importance ==
It runs through one of the main sheep-breeding areas and the main wool-producing area of the country, which is located in the extreme south of Brazil. The South region is responsible for 99% of the country's wool production. Rio Grande do Sul is the state with the highest national participation, representing 94.1% of the total. The municipalities of Santana do Livramento, Alegrete and Quaraí led the activity. Currently, meat production has become the main objective of sheep farming in Rio Grande do Sul, due to the increase in prices paid to the producer, which made the activity more attractive and profitable. Sheep breeds more adapted to the subtropical climate are used there.

In addition, the region has a large production of rice, as well as soy, corn and wheat, fruits and meats for the main slaughterhouses in the State. Rio Grande do Sul is the largest rice producer in the country, with 70.5% of Brazil's production, about 7.3 million tons in 2020, and much of the production is carried out in fields in the south of the state.

Candiota has large deposits of coal. Brazil totals 32 billion tons of coal reserves, which are mainly located in Rio Grande do Sul (89.25% of the total); Only the Candiota Deposit has 38% of all the national coal. Not by chance, the city of Hulha Negra, neighboring Candiota, has its name derived from coal.

Santana do Livramento benefits from the tourism of Brazilians who want to visit the Uruguayan city of Rivera.

The highway connects Uruguay, Argentina and the south of the state of Rio Grande do Sul to the Port of Rio Grande, one of the most important in the country.
