= Siege of Caçapava =

1837 battle of the Ragamuffin War

- Part of the Ragamuffin War
Date	1–8 April 1837
Location	Caçapava do Sul, Rio Grande do Sul, Empire of Brazil
Result	Republican victory

Belligerents
Riograndense Republic	Empire of Brazil

Commanders and leaders
Antônio de Sousa Neto	João Crisóstomo

Strength
"More than 1000 men"	540-900 men

Casualties and losses
Unknown	540-900 men captured 15 guns captured

The Siege of Caçapava was a military victory by the rebel forces during the Ragamuffin War in April 1837. Upon Bento Manuel's defection from the Imperial side, he gave the rebels intelligence that made them march upon Caçapava do Sul, one of the loyalist strongholds in the region. They managed to secure the town's surrender after besieging it for a week, capturing all the garrison's infantry. Caçapava would later become the Riograndense Republic's capital, something which lasted until 1840 when it was recaptured by the Empire.

== Background ==
Bento Manuel, one of the Empire's foremost generals, ranked amongst the most experienced commanders of the wars fought around Uruguay and Rio Grande do Sul, and victor of battles such as the Battle of Fanfa during the Ragamuffin War, decided to renege his allegiance to the Empire, joining the rebel side in said conflict in early 1837. This happened due to differences amongst him and the new provincial president, Antero Ferreira de Brito, who had replaced Araújo Ribeiro, to Bento Manuel's displeasure.

After this, Bento Manuel revealed Antero's project of uniting Caçapava do Sul's garrison with that of Rio Pardo, another isolated position. Caçapava was a strongly fortified town, and the main Imperial supply hub in the region.

== Engagement, surrender, and aftermath ==
Rebels under Antônio de Sousa Neto arrived at the town in April 1, and proceeded to siege it and its fort for a week, at which time a surrender was requested and accepted. The Imperial commander, João Crisóstomo da Silva, had attempted to break out, but was too late, and so, unsuccessful. 540 (or 900) men and 15 guns were captured.

Some of the Imperial infantry would be reorganized into the rebel armies; their officers would later be released. After this victory, most Imperial troops in the province would be forced to retreat to Porto Alegre, which was soon put under siege by Antônio de Sousa Neto's forces.

In 14 February 1839, the capital of the Riograndense Republic would be transferred from Piratini to Caçapava under orders from rebel commander Bento Gonçalves da Silva. It would remain in this role until it was recaptured in an Imperial attack in March 1840.
