= Lavras do Sul =

Municipality of Rio Grande do Sul, Brazil

- Municipality
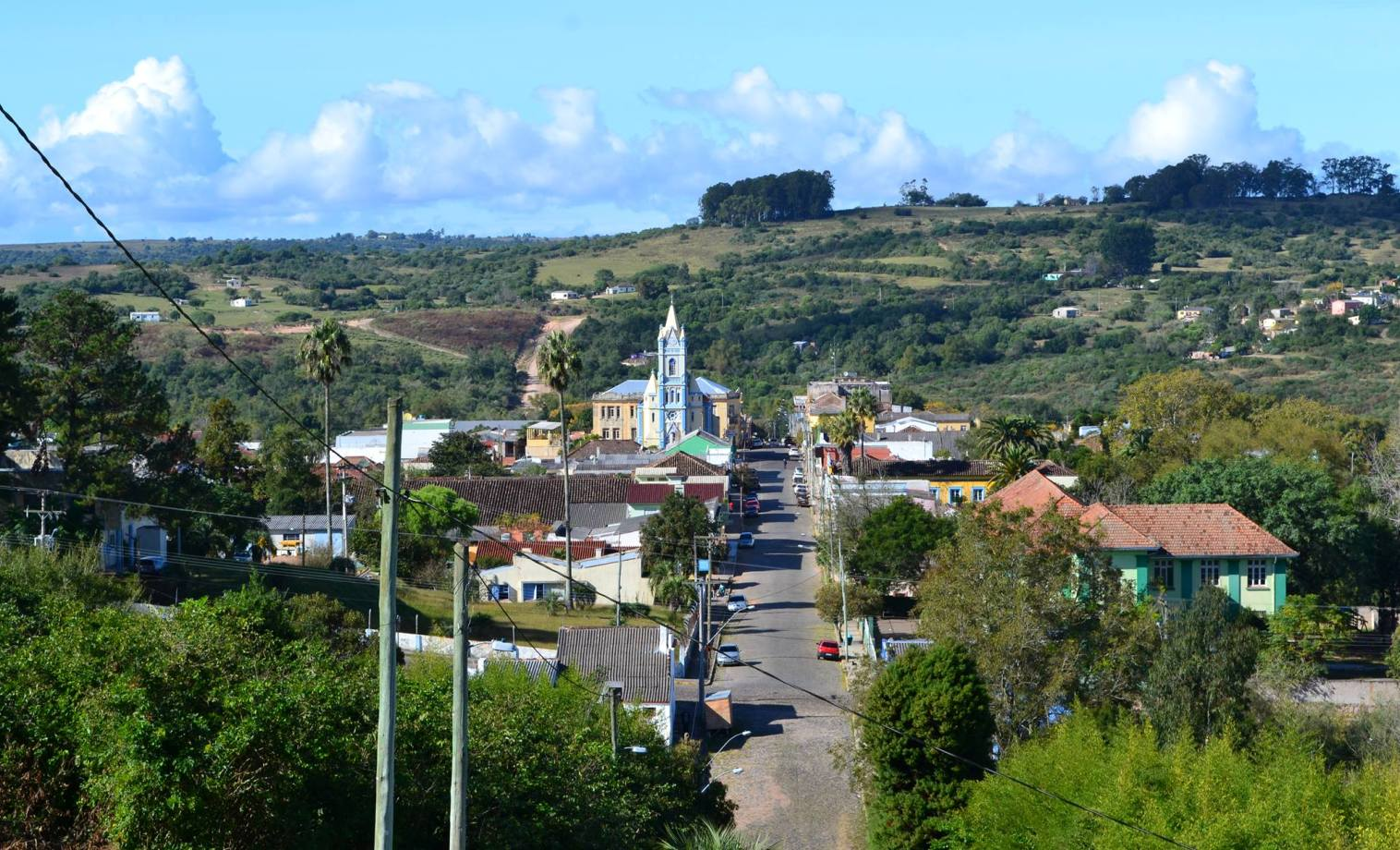

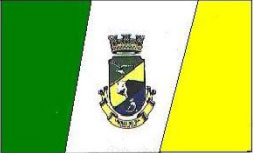
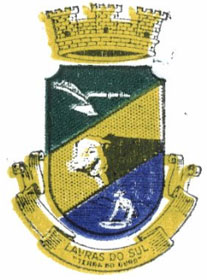
- Flag Coat of arms

- Location in Rio Grande do Sul state

- Location in Brazil
- Coordinates: 30°48′46″S 53°53′42″W
- Country: Brazil
- State: Rio Grande do Sul
- Meso-region: Sudoeste Rio-Grandense
- Micro-region: Campanha Meridional

Area
  - Total: 2,600.60 km^{2} (1,004.10 sq mi)

Population (2020)
  - Total: 7,444
  - Density: 2.862/km^{2} (7.414/sq mi)
- Time zone: UTC−3 (BRT)
- Postal code: 97390-xxx
- Website: www.lavrasdosul.rs.gov.br

Lavras do Sul is a Brazilian municipality in the southwestern part of the state of Rio Grande do Sul. It is in the Campanha Meridional micro-region and the Sudoeste Rio-Grandense meso-region. The population is 7,444 (2020 est.) in an area of 2,600.60 km^{2} (1,004.10 sq mi). The Camaquã River flows through the municipality.

== Bounding municipalities ==
- Bagé
- Dom Pedrito
- Caçapava do Sul
- São Gabriel

== See also ==
- List of municipalities in Rio Grande do Sul
