= Pedras Altas =

Municipality of Rio Grande do Sul, Brazil

- Municipality
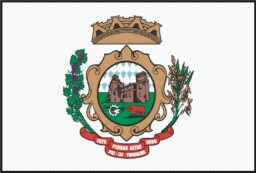
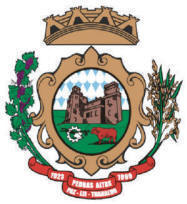
- Flag Coat of arms

- Location in Rio Grande do Sul state

- Location in Brazil
- Coordinates: 31°43′58″S 53°35′02″W
- Country: Brazil
- State: Rio Grande do Sul
- Mesoregion: Sudeste Rio-grandense
- Microregion: Jaguarão
- Founded: 16 April 1996

Government
  - Mayor: Gabriel de Léllis Junior

Area
  - Total: 1,377.37 km^{2} (531.81 sq mi)
- Elevation: 375 m (1,230 ft)

Population (2020)
  - Total: 1,954
  - Density: 1.419/km^{2} (3.674/sq mi)
- Time zone: UTC−3 (BRT)
- Postal code: 96487-000
- Website: pedrasaltas.rs.gov.br

Pedras Altas (Portuguese meaning "Tall Stones") is a Brazilian municipality in the southern part of the state of Rio Grande do Sul. The population is 1,954 (2020 est.) in an area of 1377.37 km^{2}. The Jaguarão River, which forms the border with Uruguay here, flows along the southwestern part of the municipality.

== Bounding municipalities ==
- Aceguá
- Candiota
- Herval
- Pinheiro Machado

== See also ==
- List of municipalities in Rio Grande do Sul
