= House of Ulhôa Cintra =

Brazilian historical house

- Casa de Ulhôa Cintra; Casa dos Ministérios
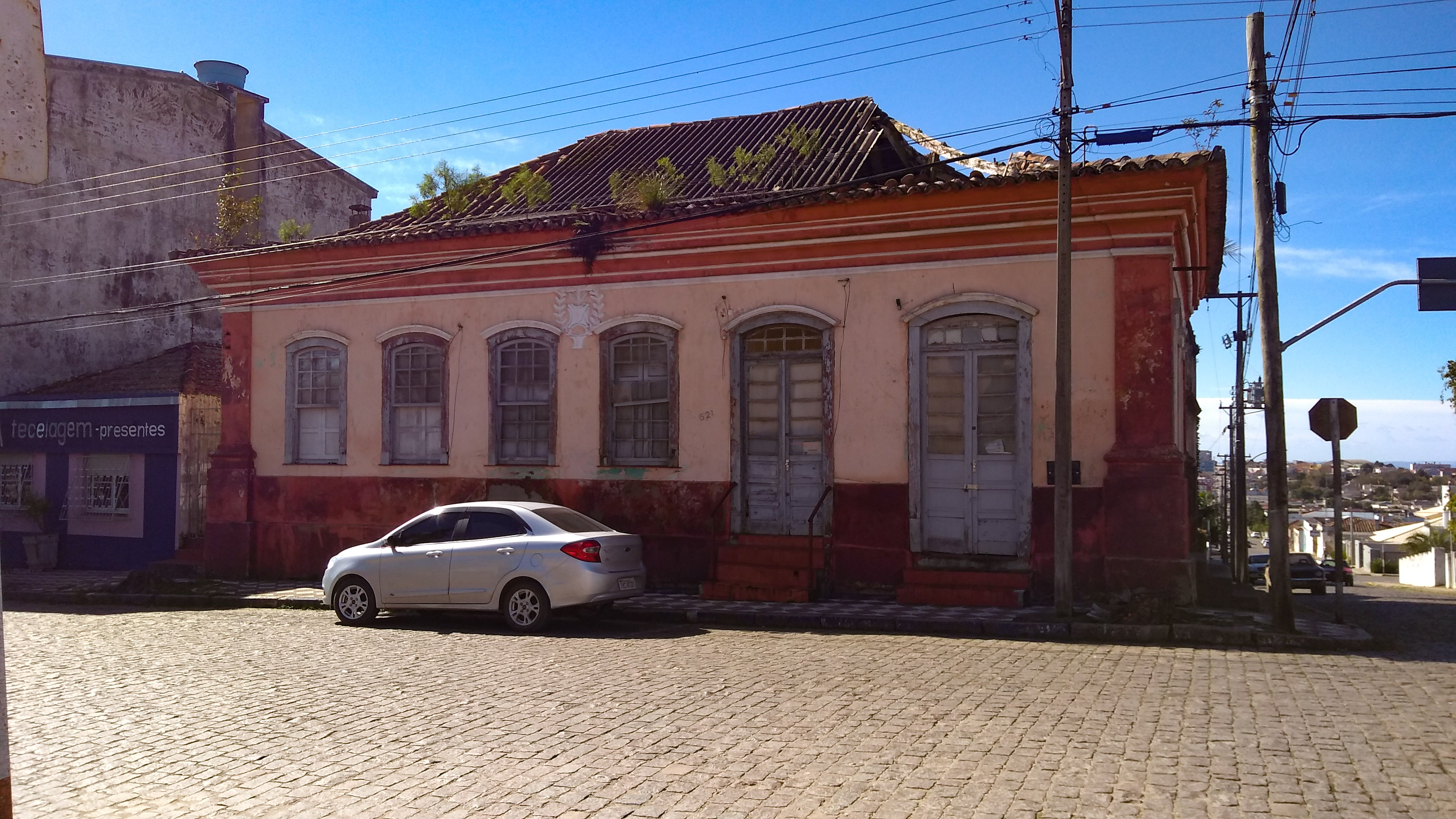
- House of Ulhôa Cintra, Caçapava do Sul, Rio Grande do Sul, Brazil

- Location within Brazil

General information
- Location: Caçapava do Sul, Rio Grande do Sul, Brazil
- Coordinates: 30.512296°S 53.49113°W

Technical details
- Floor count: 1
- Floor area: 435 square metres (4,680 ft^{2})

The House of Ulhôa Cintra (Portuguese: Casa de Ulhôa Cintra), also known as the House of Minister (Portuguese: Casa dos Ministérios) is a historic residence in Caçapava do Sul, Rio Grande do Sul, Brazil. It was built in the middle of the 19th century and was a meeting place of figures associated with the Ragamuffin War; it notably housed the printing press of their newspaper, O Povo. It was subsequently owned by José Pinheiro de Ulhôa Cintra and his family. The house is in a simple Portuguese colonial style, and covers 435 square metres (4,680 ft^{2}). Casa de Ulhôa Cintra was listed as a historic structure by the Historic and Artistic Heritage Institute of Rio Grande do Sul in 1994.

== Location ==
The House of Ulhôa Cintra is located on the corner of Rua 7 de Setembro and Rua Borges de Medeiros. It is one of many historic structures that surround the broad public plaza surrounded the Parish Church of Our Lady of the Assumption (Portuguese: Igreja Matriz Nossa Senhora Da Assunção).

== History ==
The House of Ulhôa Cintra is associated with the Ragamuffin War, a Republican uprising in Rio Grande do Sul. The conflict began in 1835 and only ended in 1845. The mansion once housed the typographic works of O Povo, the official newspaper of the Ragamuffin revolution. 116 of the 160 issues of the newspaper were printed at the house. The Farroupilhas, supporters of the Ragamuffin War, called the house the Casa de Reunião, or meeting house. The house became the residence of Ulhôa Cintra and his family after the end of the Ragamuffin War. It was later used to exhibit films and house a small museum, but its successive owners made few alterations to the house, and it retains many of its original details.

== Structure ==
The House of Ulhôa Cintra is a single-story house built in the late Portuguese colonial style; it is typical of other houses built in the first half of the 19th century in Brazil. It has a tiled hipped roof with eaves and a simple cymatium. The house sits above, but in close alignment to the street. It has two doors, each accessed by steps. There are four sash windows at the front of the building, and two to the side. All have internal shutters of wood. An ornate relief, probably the coat-of-arms of the Cintra family, is above window level in the middle of the north façade. The house has a rectangular floor plan and covers 435 square metres (4,680 ft^{2}).

Casa de Ulhôa Cintra is in advanced state of disrepair, and is unused due to a partial roof collapse.

== Protected status ==
Casa de Ulhôa Cintra was listed as a historic structure by the Historic and Artistic Heritage Institute of Rio Grande do Sul (Portuguese: Instituto do Patrimônio Histórico e Artístico do Estado) (IPHAE) in 1994.

== Access ==
Casa de Ulhôa Cintra is not open to the public and may not be visited.
