= Vila Nova do Sul =

Municipality of Rio Grande do Sul, Brazil

- Municipality
- Flag Coat of arms

- Location within Rio Grande do Sul

- Location in Brazil
- Coordinates: 30°20′38″S 53°52′58″W
- Country: Brazil
- State: Rio Grande do Sul

Government
  - Mayor: Sérgio Ovídio Roso Coradini (2021-Present)

Population (2022)
  - Total: 3,863
- Time zone: UTC−3 (BRT)
- Website: vilanovadosul.rs.gov.br

Vila Nova do Sul is a municipality in the state of Rio Grande do Sul, Brazil.

== See also ==
- List of municipalities in Rio Grande do Sul
