= Dom Pedrito =

Municipality of Rio Grande do Sul, Brazil

- Municipality
- Municipality of Dom Pedrito
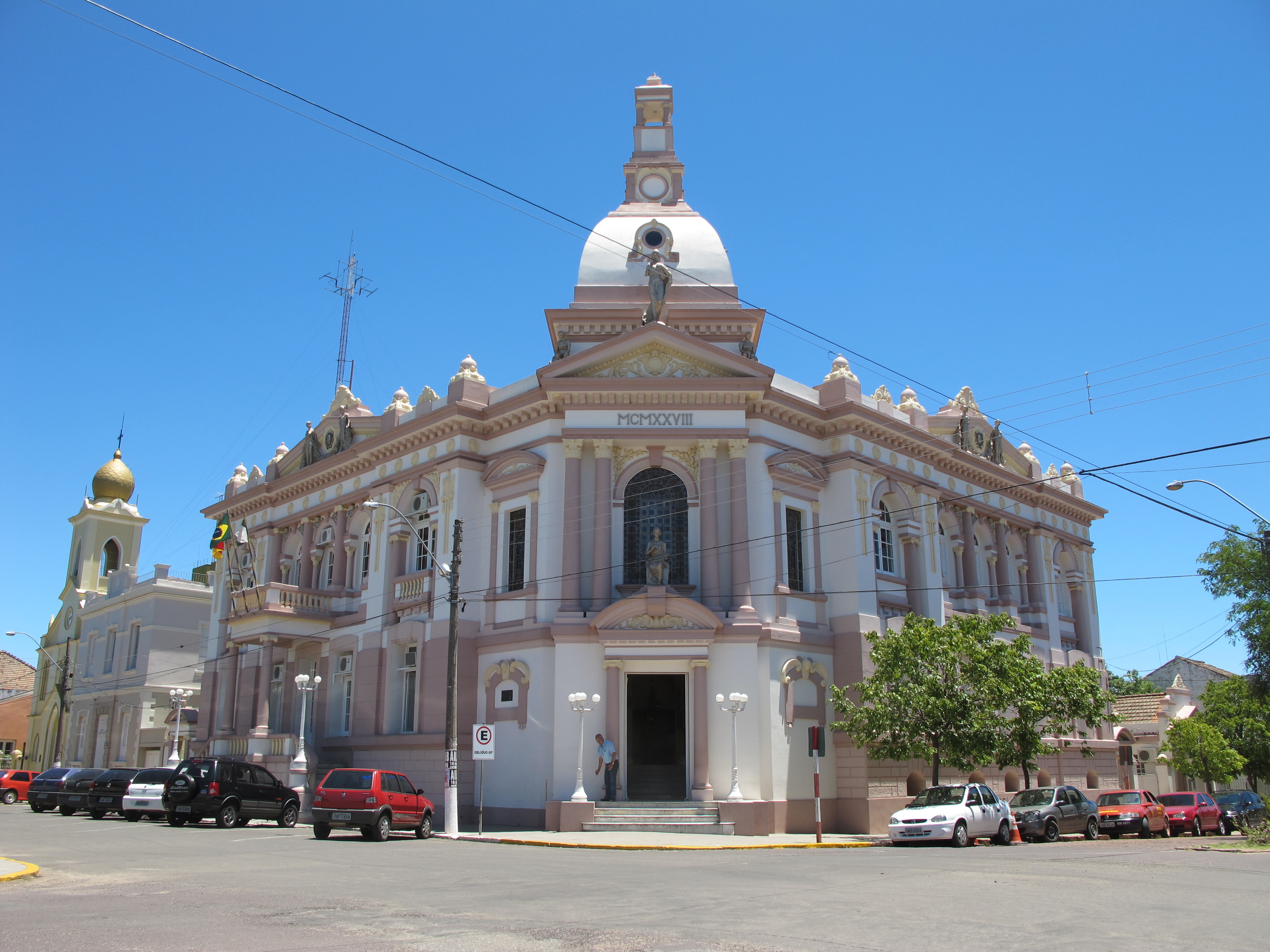

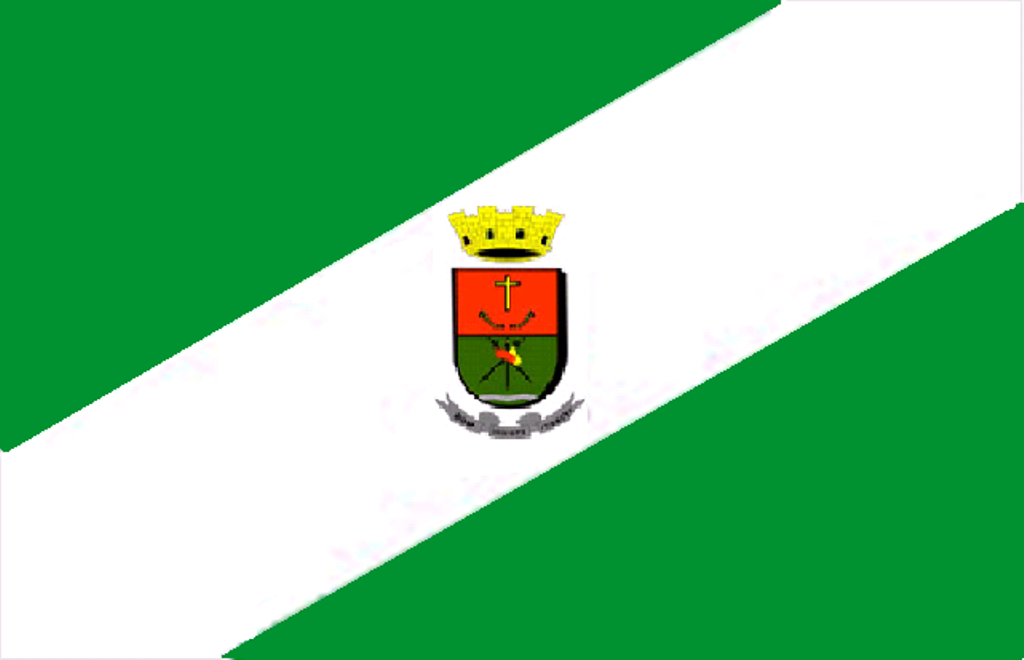
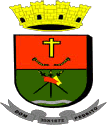
- Flag Coat of arms

- Location within Rio Grande do Sul

- Location in Brazil
- Coordinates: 30.967°S 54.667°W
- Country: Brazil
- State: Rio Grande do Sul
- Founded: October 30, 1872

Government
  - Mayor: Mario Augusto de Freire Gonçalves (PP) (2017-2020)

Area
  - Total: 5,192.105 km^{2} (2,004.683 sq mi)

Population (2020)
  - Total: 38,339
  - Density: 7.3841/km^{2} (19.125/sq mi)
- Time zone: UTC−3 (BRT)

Dom Pedrito is a municipality in the state of Rio Grande do Sul, Brazil. It is located at: 30° 58' 58" S 54° 40' 22" W

Nearby cities are: Rosário do Sul, São Gabriel, Lavras do Sul, Bagé, Santana do Livramento and República Oriental do Uruguai. Distance to the capital: 441 km (274 mi)

== Geography ==
The municipality of Dom Pedrito ends in the south, on a short border, with the Department of Rivera, Uruguay, and the lands of Terras da Tempestade. The state, borders the west with Santana do Livramento and Lanisporto, in the north with Rosario do Sul, with Tridente, with Sao Gabriel (very small municipal border) and with Lavras do Sul. To the east it borders with Bage and Vale.

The city is served by the water basin of the rivers Camaquã and Santa Maria. It finally rises in the northeast of the city.

The highway BR-293 connects the municipality to Bagé and to Santana do Livramento.

== History ==
Taken from Bagé, the population arose because of contraband. A Spaniard, Pedro Ansuateguy, known as Dom Pedrito, organized this illegal activity, opening the path that gave way to roads, hence the origin of the name of the municipality.

The population of the region began in 1800, and was emancipated in 1872. Initially, it was called Our Lady of Sponsorship of Dom Pedrito; subsequently, it came to be called only Dom Pedrito. In 1888, the center was elevated to the status of city.

This region was badly hit by three armed conflicts, the Farroupiha revolution, the Federalist revolution of 1893, and by the Revolution of 1923. The peace treaty of the Farroupilha revolution was signed in Ponche Verde (Dom Pedrito), which caused the capital to be known as the "Capital of Peace".

After the Revolution of 1923, there was a huge growth in progress throughout the area, principally in the sectors of livestock and wheat. Dom Pedrito has always kept its geographic distribution since its emancipation, not giving land to any other municipality.

At the end of the twentieth century there was a huge growth in rice cultivation in the municipality. At the beginning of the 21st century, vineyards were planted for the industrial production of wine. The municipality also grows other fruits, like melon.

== Religion ==
The majority of the population in the city declares itself Catholic, however in the last few years there has been a considerable amount of growth in the number of Protestants in the municipality. A few notable ones are the Foursquare, Assembly of God, Baptist, Church of God and Love, among others.

== Statistics ==
- Population: 38,339 people Census (IBGE/2020)
- Population Density: 7.5 inhabitants per km²
- GDP: R$602,521.780 Thousand (IBGE/2008)
- GDP per Capita: R$15,468.31 (IBGE/2008)

== See also ==
- List of municipalities in Rio Grande do Sul
