= Aceguá, Brazil =

Municipality of Rio Grande do Sul, Brazil

Aceguá
- Municipality
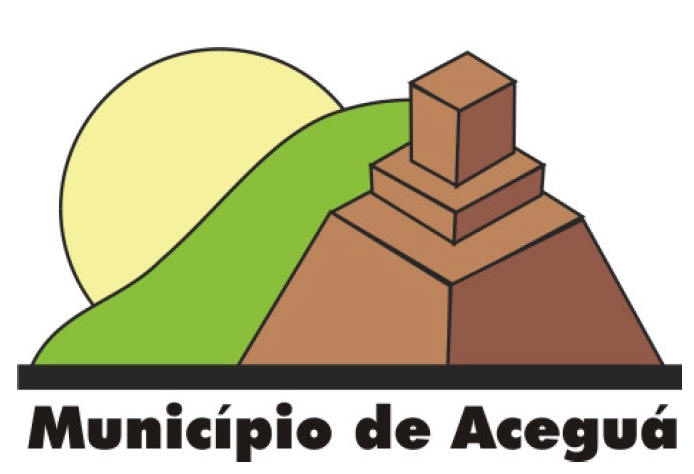
- Flag Coat of arms

- Location within Rio Grande do Sul

- Location in Brazil
- Coordinates: 31°45′11″S 54°03′22″W
- Country: Brazil
- State: Rio Grande do Sul
- Founded: 16 April 1996

Government
  - Mayor: Glécio Rodrigues

Population (2020)
  - Total: 4,942
- Time zone: UTC−3 (BRT)
- Website: http://www.acegua.rs.gov.br/

Aceguá (Portuguese: [a.seˈɡwa]) is a municipality in the state of Rio Grande do Sul, Brazil.

== Location ==
It is located in Rio Grande do Sul, on the border with Uruguay.

== Paleontology ==
Here are outcrops located between the City of Aceguá and Bagé, located along the highway BR-153. They are Rio do Rasto Formation and Late Permian age.

== See also ==
- List of municipalities in Rio Grande do Sul
