= Dom Feliciano =

Municipality of Rio Grande do Sul, Brazil

- Municipality
- Municipality of Dom Feliciano
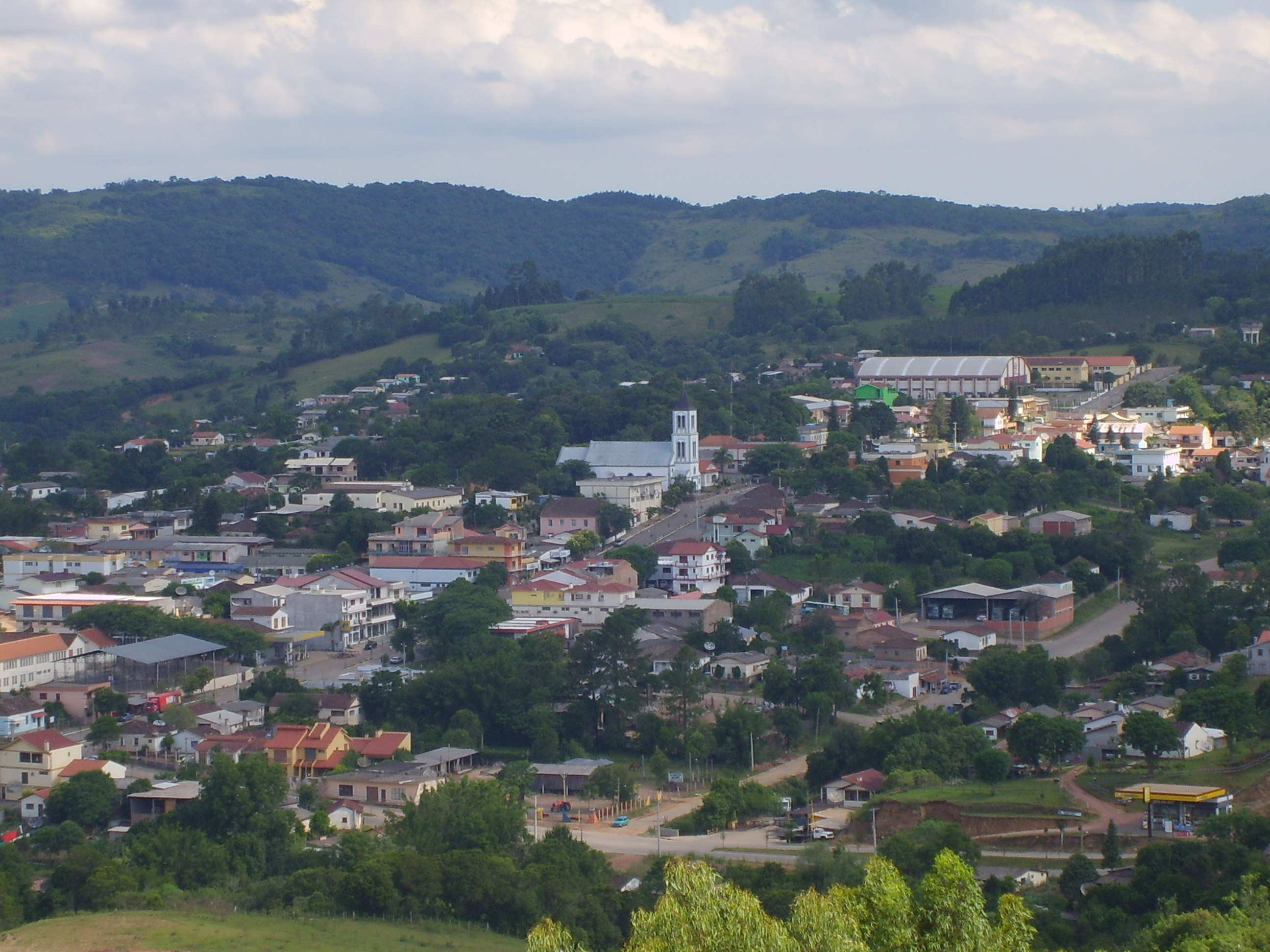

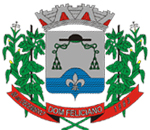
- Flag Coat of arms

- Location in Rio Grande do Sul
- Coordinates: 30°42′S 52°07′W
- Country: Brazil
- State: Rio Grande do Sul

Population (2020)
  - Total: 15,487
- Time zone: UTC−3 (BRT)
- Website: domfeliciano.rs.gov.br

Dom Feliciano is a municipality in the state of Rio Grande do Sul, Brazil. As of 2020, it had a population of 15,487 people, of whom 90% are of Polish descent.

== See also ==
- List of municipalities in Rio Grande do Sul
