= Piratini (city) =

Municipality of Rio Grande do Sul, Brazil

- Municipality
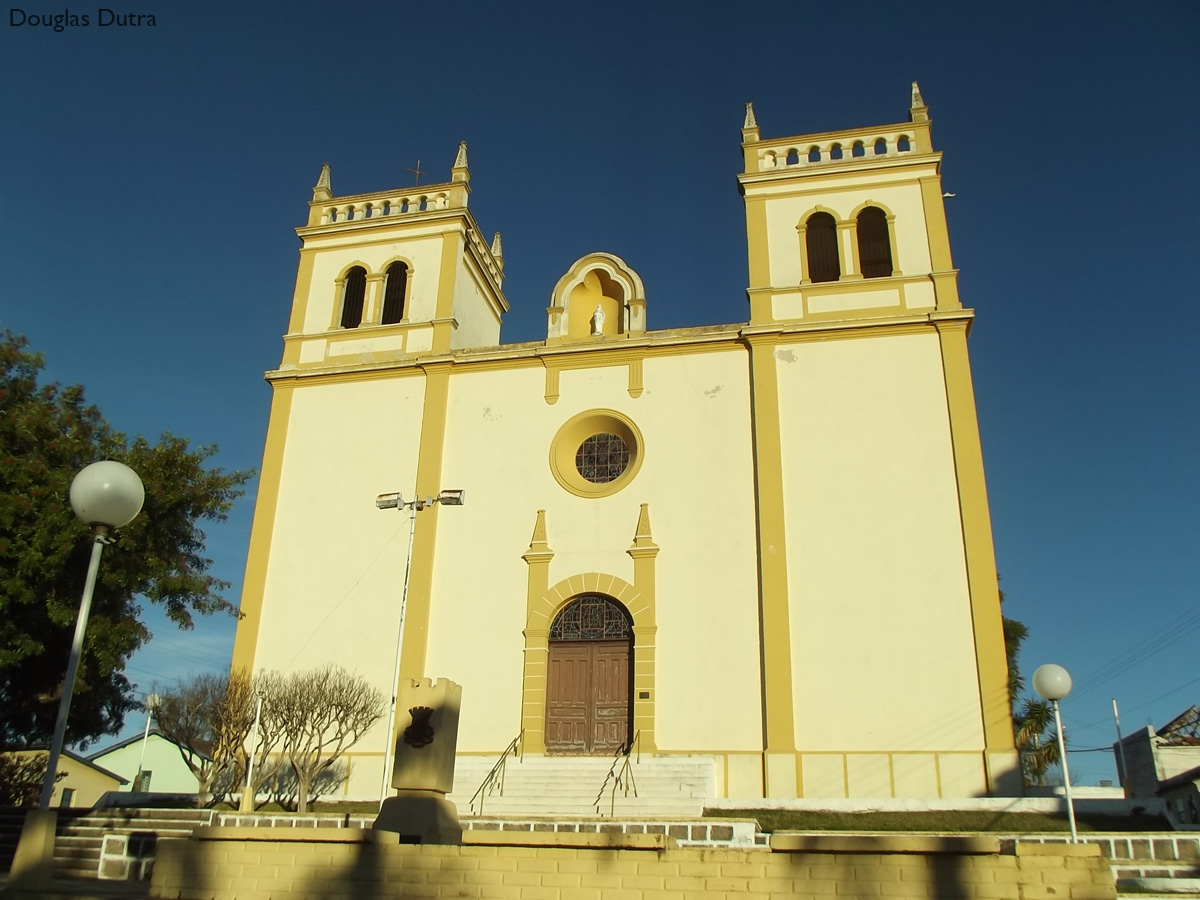
- Catholic Church

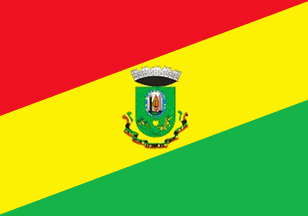
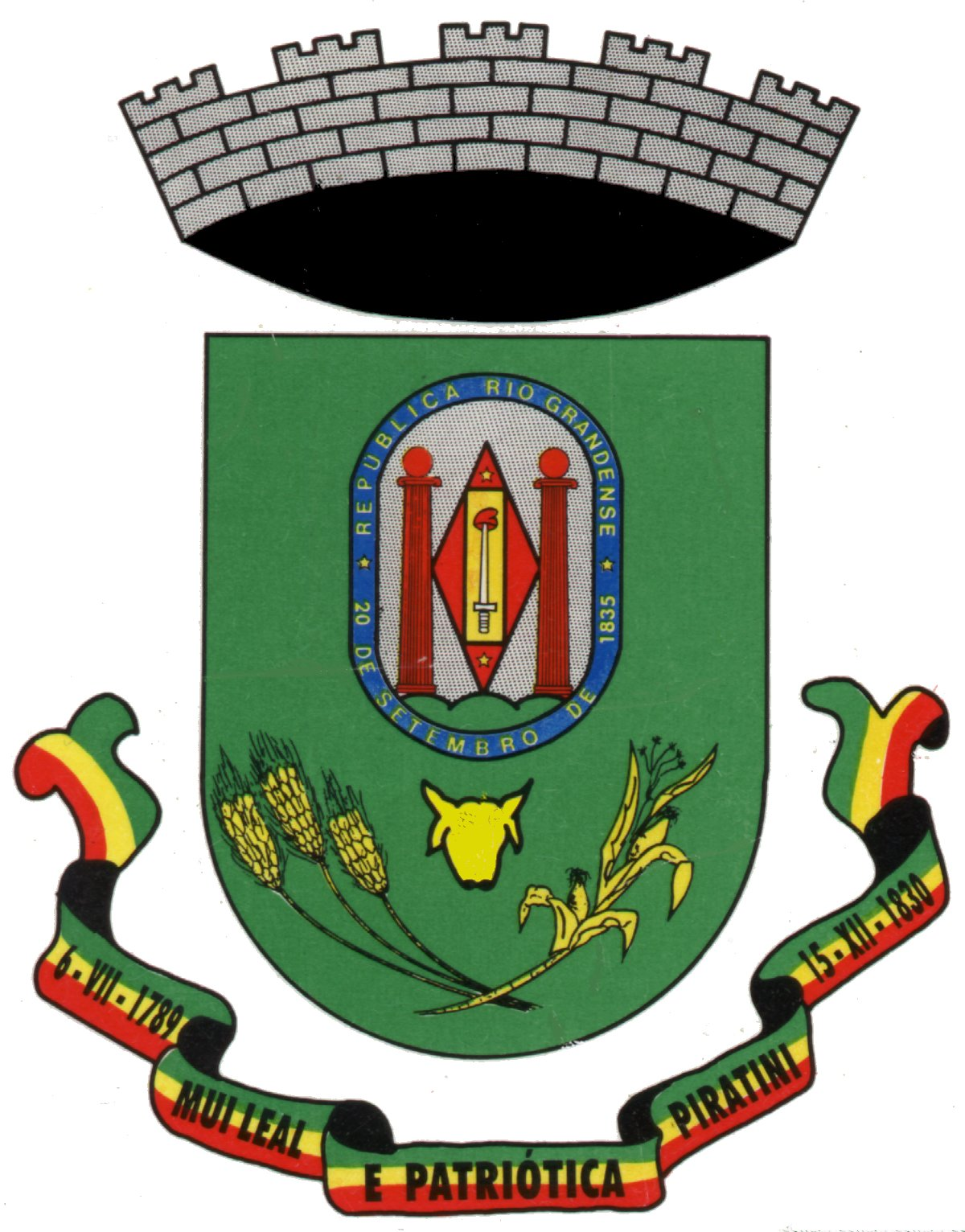
- Flag Coat of arms

- Location of Piratini in Rio Grande do Sul

- Location in Brazil
- Coordinates: 31°26′52″S 53°06′14″W
- Country: Brazil
- State: Rio Grande do Sul
- Mesoregion: Sudoeste Rio-grandense
- Microregion: Serras de Sudeste
- Founded: 6 July 1789

Government
  - Mayor: Vilso Agnelo da Silva Gomes

Area
  - Total: 3,561.48 km^{2} (1,375.10 sq mi)
- Elevation: 349 m (1,145 ft)

Population (2020)
  - Total: 20,704
  - Density: 5.8133/km^{2} (15.056/sq mi)
- Demonym: Piratinenses
- Time zone: UTC−3 (BRT)

Piratini is a city in the Brazilian state of Rio Grande do Sul with a population of some 21,000. It is the former capital of the short-lived Riograndense Republic which was proclaimed on 11 September 1836.

== See also ==
- List of municipalities in Rio Grande do Sul
