= Pinheiro Machado, Rio Grande do Sul =

Municipality of Rio Grande do Sul, Brazil

Pinheiro Machado
- Municipality
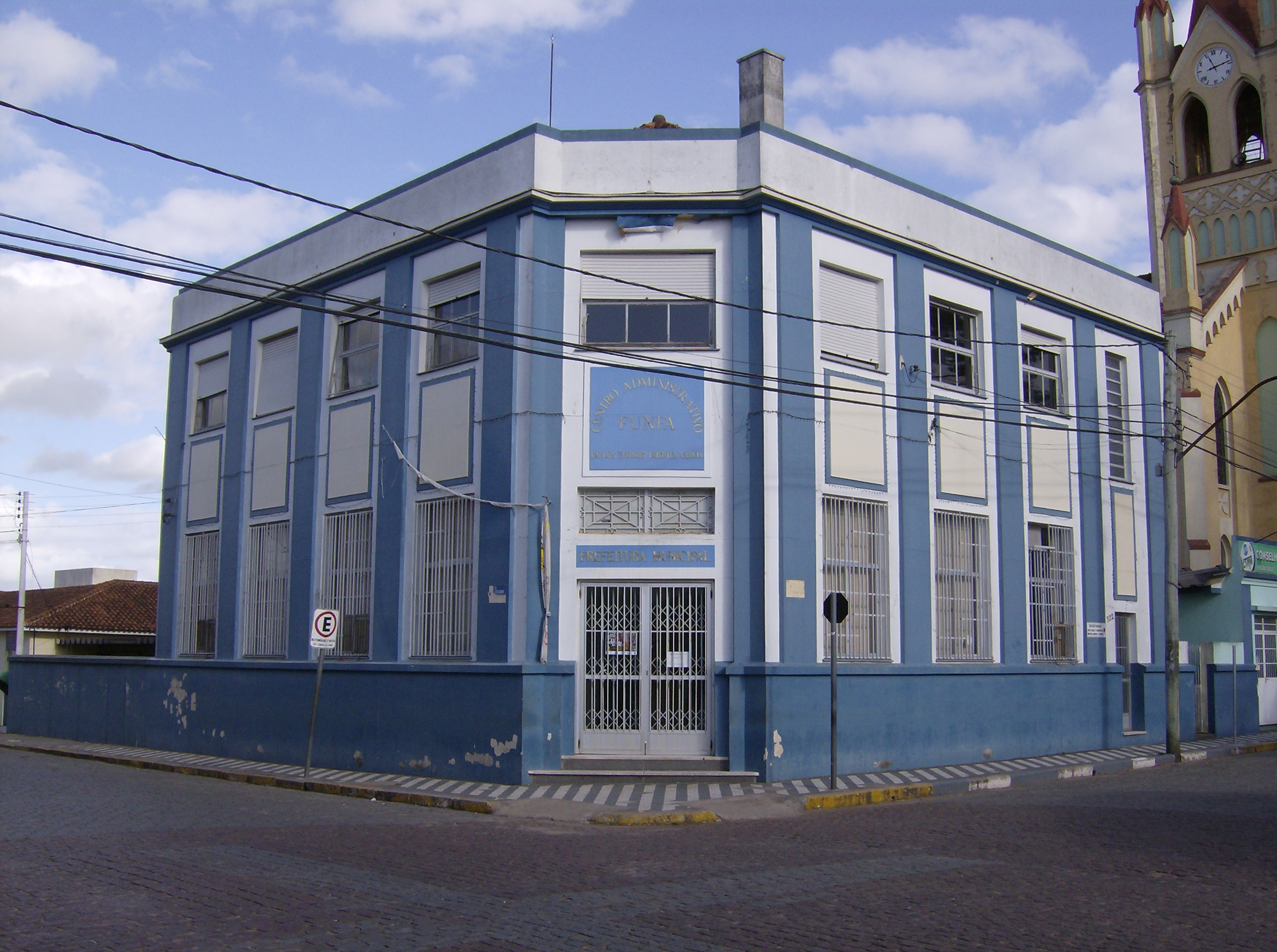
- Town Hall.

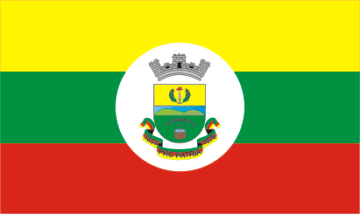
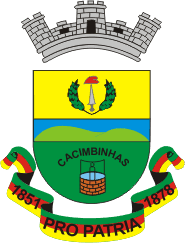
- Flag Coat of arms
- Nickname: Nacional capital of sheep barbecue
- Location of Pinheiro Machado in Rio Grande do Sul

- Location in Brazil
- Coordinates: 31°34′40″S 53°22′21″W
- Country: Brazil
- State: Rio Grande do Sul
- Mesoregion: Sudoeste Rio-grandense
- Microregion: Serras de Sudeste
- Founded: 2 May 1879

Government
  - Mayor: Ronaldo Costa Madruga

Area
  - Total: 2,248.221 km^{2} (868.043 sq mi)
- Elevation: 436 m (1,430 ft)

Population (2020)
  - Total: 12,195
  - Density: 5.4243/km^{2} (14.049/sq mi)
- Time zone: UTC−3 (BRT)

Pinheiro Machado (Portuguese pronunciation: [piˈɲejɾu maˈʃadu]) is a municipality in the state of Rio Grande do Sul, Brazil.

== History ==
Pinheiro Machado is one of the oldest towns in the state of Rio Grande do Sul. Until 1830, the area was owned by the city of Rio Grande. After it became a part of Piratini city, separating on 24 February 1879, by the name of Nossa Senhora da Luz, or Nossa senhora da Luz das Cacimbinhas. The occupation of this town, according to records, began by the brigadier Rafael Pinto Bandeira, about 1765. The first inhabitants were the azorean Tomás Antonio de Oliveira and José Dutra de Andrade, who owned "allotments" (Portuguese: sesmaria (pt)) of land at Coxilha do Veleda, in 1790. According to the legend, Dutra de Andrade had lost his vision and then, he made a promise that if he would recover his vision washing his eyes on the miraculous water of the well located there, he would order the building of a chantry in honor of Nossa Senhora Aparecida and so, the miracle happened. After the chantry, a parsonage was created in 1851.

== Geography ==
Pinheiro Machado is located at latitude 31º34'42"S and longitude 53º22'52"W, at an altitude of 1,430 feet (440 m).

It has an area of 868.04 square miles (2,248.2 km^{2}) and the population in 2020 was 12,195.

=== Relief ===
The relief, located in a plateau known as Serras de Sudeste, is a rather irregular, specially the Passarinho's Hill, Veleda's Hill and Asperezas Hill. Also highlights the formation of countless hills, mainly in the second district. The soil is characterized by shallow, with the presence of rock outcroppings.

=== Climate ===
The climate of Pinheiro Machado is oceanic (Cfb, according to the Köppen climate classification), with warm summers and cool winters (with high occurrence of frost), with annual temperature of about 61 °F (16 °C). The hottest month is January, with average temperature of 70 °F (21 °C), while the coldest month is July, with average temperature of 52 °F (11 °C). The annual rainfall is of about 1,200 millimetres (47 in), with rains regularly distributed during the year. Snowfalls are not uncommon in the city, and the most significative ones can occur about one or twice a decade. The last snowfalls occurred on 4 September 2006 and on 5 September 2008, with moderate snowfall during the afternoon. Frosts and sleet are more common.

In 2 July 2025, the municipality recorded a low temperature of −9.1 °C (15.6 °F).

Climate data for Pinheiro Machado (modelled data)
Month	Jan	Feb	Mar	Apr	May	Jun	Jul	Aug	Sep	Oct	Nov	Dec	Year
Mean daily maximum °C (°F)	27 (81)	26 (79)	24 (75)	21 (70)	18 (64)	16 (61)	15 (59)	17 (63)	18 (64)	21 (70)	23 (73)	25 (77)	21 (70)
Mean daily minimum °C (°F)	16 (61)	16 (61)	15 (59)	12 (54)	9 (48)	7 (45)	6 (43)	8 (46)	8 (46)	11 (52)	12 (54)	14 (57)	11 (52)
Average precipitation mm (inches)	75 (3.0)	85 (3.3)	81 (3.2)	122 (4.8)	101 (4.0)	111 (4.4)	94 (3.7)	84 (3.3)	118 (4.6)	119 (4.7)	109 (4.3)	94 (3.7)	1,193 (47)
Source: MeteoBlue

== See also ==
- List of municipalities in Rio Grande do Sul
