= Encruzilhada do Sul =

Municipality of Rio Grande do Sul, Brazil

- Municipality
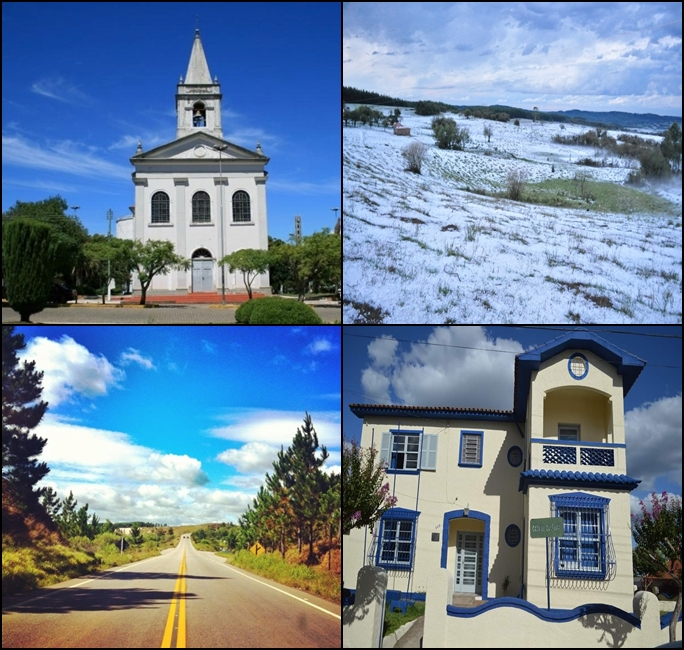

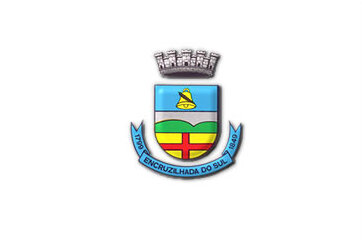
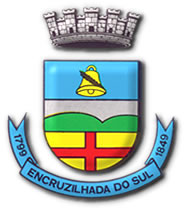
- Flag Coat of arms

- Location within Rio Grande do Sul

- Location in Brazil
- Coordinates: 30°32′S 52°31′W
- Country: Brazil
- State: Rio Grande do Sul

Population (2020)
  - Total: 25,960
- Time zone: UTC−3 (BRT)

Encruzilhada do Sul is a municipality in the state of Rio Grande do Sul, Brazil.

== Geography ==
=== Climate ===
The climate is humid subtropical (Köppen: Cfa), with hot summers and mild winters, with rare occasions at 0 °C or below, typical of areas at low altitudes in the subtropics. It is similar to other cities of Rio Grande do Sul and Santa Catarina on the plains or with cities in eastern Australia. The climate is sunny and humid all year round.

Climate data for Encruzilhada do Sul (1991–2020)
Month	Jan	Feb	Mar	Apr	May	Jun	Jul	Aug	Sep	Oct	Nov	Dec	Year
Record high °C (°F)	36.0 (96.8)	35.2 (95.4)	35.1 (95.2)	32.7 (90.9)	28.0 (82.4)	27.0 (80.6)	26.7 (80.1)	29.0 (84.2)	31.0 (87.8)	31.8 (89.2)	35.0 (95.0)	36.7 (98.1)	36.7 (98.1)
Mean daily maximum °C (°F)	29.2 (84.6)	28.5 (83.3)	27.1 (80.8)	23.9 (75.0)	19.9 (67.8)	17.5 (63.5)	17.0 (62.6)	19.4 (66.9)	20.4 (68.7)	23.2 (73.8)	25.9 (78.6)	28.4 (83.1)	23.4 (74.1)
Daily mean °C (°F)	22.8 (73.0)	22.3 (72.1)	21.1 (70.0)	18.3 (64.9)	14.9 (58.8)	12.7 (54.9)	11.9 (53.4)	13.7 (56.7)	14.7 (58.5)	17.3 (63.1)	19.5 (67.1)	21.7 (71.1)	17.6 (63.7)
Mean daily minimum °C (°F)	18.3 (64.9)	18.2 (64.8)	17.2 (63.0)	14.7 (58.5)	11.7 (53.1)	9.6 (49.3)	8.5 (47.3)	9.8 (49.6)	10.8 (51.4)	13.1 (55.6)	14.8 (58.6)	16.9 (62.4)	13.6 (56.5)
Record low °C (°F)	9.9 (49.8)	7.3 (45.1)	6.2 (43.2)	3.1 (37.6)	0.7 (33.3)	−2.0 (28.4)	−2.5 (27.5)	0.1 (32.2)	0.9 (33.6)	1.9 (35.4)	4.8 (40.6)	5.3 (41.5)	−2.5 (27.5)
Average precipitation mm (inches)	155.9 (6.14)	130.4 (5.13)	111.3 (4.38)	137.5 (5.41)	137.0 (5.39)	135.6 (5.34)	174.0 (6.85)	124.5 (4.90)	160.4 (6.31)	177.6 (6.99)	121.3 (4.78)	139.4 (5.49)	1,704.9 (67.12)
Average precipitation days (≥ 1.0 mm)	10	9	8	8	8	8	9	9	9	10	8	8	104
Average relative humidity (%)	72.7	75.6	75.8	77.3	81.0	81.6	80.0	75.7	77.0	75.8	70.4	69.7	76.1
Mean monthly sunshine hours	223.3	191.8	200.6	154.1	137.9	121.1	131.4	135.0	137.8	162.9	202.5	222.1	2,020.5
Source 1: Instituto Nacional de Meteorologia
Source 2: NOAA and WeatherBase (extremes)

== See also ==
- Paleorrota Geopark
- List of municipalities in Rio Grande do Sul
