= Candiota =

Municipality in Rio Grande do Sul, Brazil

Coordinates: 31°36′S 53°44′W

- Municipality
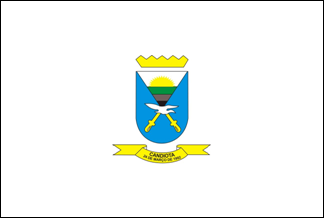
- Flag Coat of arms

- Location of Candiota in Rio Grande do Sul
- Country: Brazil
- Region: South
- State: Rio Grande do Sul
- Mesoregion: Sudeste Rio-Grandense
- Microregion: Serras do Sudeste
- Founded: 24 March 1992

Government
  - Mayor: Luiz Carlos Folador (MDB, 2021 - 2024)

Area
  - Total: 933.628 km^{2} (360.476 sq mi)

Population (2021)
  - Total: 9,707
  - Density: 10.40/km^{2} (26.93/sq mi)
- Demonym: Candiotense
- Time zone: UTC−3 (BRT)
- Website: Official website

Candiota is a municipality in the state of Rio Grande do Sul, Brazil. As of 2020, the estimated population was 9,647.

== See also ==
- List of municipalities in Rio Grande do Sul
