= Santana da Boa Vista =

Municipality of Rio Grande do Sul, Brazil

- Municipality
- Flag Coat of arms

- Location within Rio Grande do Sul

- Location in Brazil
- Coordinates: 30°52′S 53°07′W
- Country: Brazil
- State: Rio Grande do Sul

Population (2020)
  - Total: 8,067
- Time zone: UTC−3 (BRT)
  - Summer (DST): UTC-2

Santana da Boa Vista is a municipality in the state of Rio Grande do Sul, Brazil.

== See also ==
- List of municipalities in Rio Grande do Sul
