= Camaquã River =

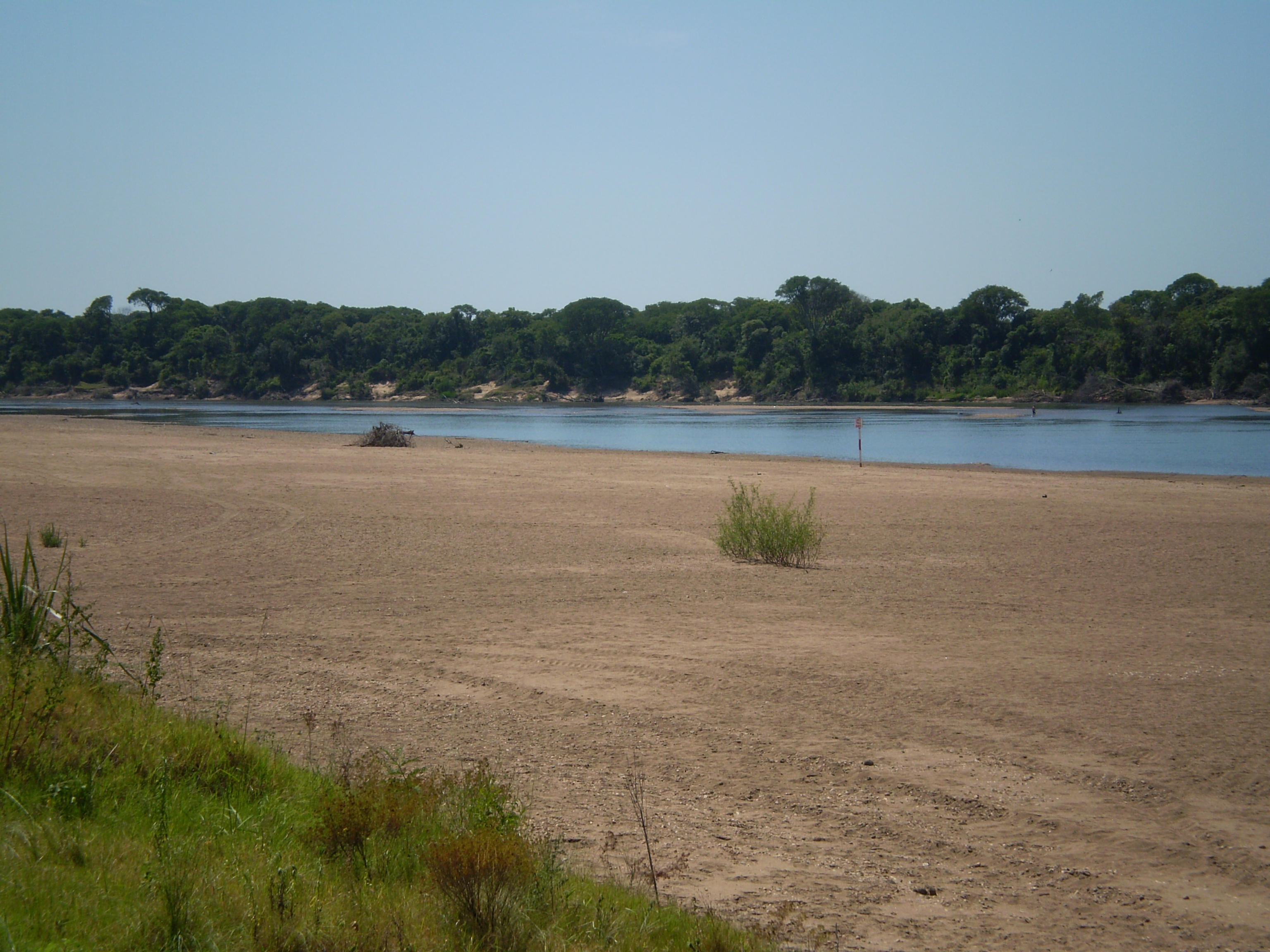

- Mouth location in Brazil
- Native name: Rio Camaquã (Portuguese)

Location
- Country: Brazil

Physical characteristics
- Source
  - location: Rio Grande do Sul state
- Mouth
  - location: Lagoa dos Patos
  - coordinates: 31°16′18″S 51°45′55″W

The Camaquã River (Portuguese pronunciation: [kamakuˈɐ̃ or kamaˈkwɐ̃]) is a river of Rio Grande do Sul state in southern Brazil.

The delta of the river, where it empties into the Lagoa dos Patos, is protected by the 7,993 hectares (19,750 acres) Camaquã State Park, created in 1975.

== See also ==
- List of rivers of Rio Grande do Sul
