= Osorio =

Osorio (also Osório) is a surname of Spanish and Portuguese origin. Notable people with this surname include:

== Surname ==
- Aitor Osorio (born 1975), Andorran swimmer
- Aldo Osorio (born 1974), Argentine footballer
- Alejandro Osorio (born 1998), Colombian cyclist
- Alejandro Osorio (footballer) (born 1976), Chilean footballer
- Alfonso Osorio (1923–2018), Spanish politician
- Amando Osório (1890–1946), Filipino poet
- Ana Elisa Osorio, Venezuelan politician
- Anthony Osorio (born 1994), Canadian soccer player
- António Horta Osório (born 1964), Portuguese banker
- Antonio Osorio y Villegas, Spanish nobleman and soldier
- Beltrán Alfonso Osorio, 18th Duke of Alburquerque (1918–1994), Spanish peer
- Bong Osorio (1953–2020), Filipino media executive and professor
- Camila Osorio (born 2001), Colombian tennis player
- Carlos Manuel Arana Osorio (1918–2003), Guatemalan politician
- Carolina Osorio, American engineer
- Claudio Osorio (born 1958), Venezuelan entrepreneur
- Dante Osorio (born 1993), Mexican footballer
- Darío Osorio (born 2004), Chilean footballer
- Diego Alvarez de Osorio (1485–1536), Nicaraguan bishop
- Diego Osorio (born 1970), Colombian footballer
- Emilio Osorio, Mexican actor and singer
- Felipe Barrera-Osorio, Colombian economist
- Fernando Osorio, Colombian-Venezuelan musician
- Francisco Meneses Osorio (1630–1705), Spanish painter
- Francisco Osorio (born 1975), Colombian boxer
- Frank Osorio (born 1987), Colombian cyclist
- Gabriel Osorio Vargas, Chilean film director
- Gabriela Osorio (born 1990), Mexican politician
- García de Toledo Osorio, 4th Marquess of Villafranca (1514–1577), Spanish general and politician
- Georgina Osorio (born 1958), Panamanian swimmer
- Gerard Osorio (born 1993), Spanish volleyball player
- Héctor S. Osorio (1928–2016), Uruguayan professor and lichenologist
- Hernando Osorio (born 1953), Colombian painter
- Humberto Osorio (born 1988), Colombian footballer
- Isabel Osorio (1522–1589), Spanish courtier
- Ivan Osorio, American political commentator
- J Balvin, birth name José Álvaro Osorio Balvín, Colombian singer
- Jeimy Osorio, Puerto Rican actress and singer
- Jerónimo Osório (1506–1580), Portuguese bishop and historian
- Jesús Tecú Osorio (born 1971), Guatemalan activist
- Jocelyn Osorio, Chilean actress and model
- Jonathan Osorio (born 1992), Canadian soccer player
- Jonathan Kamakawiwo'ole Osorio, Native Hawaiian professor
- Jorge Osorio (born 1977), Chilean football referee
- José Abílio Osório Soares (1947–2007), Indonesian politician
- Juan Osorio (born 1957), Mexican producer
- Juan Carlos Osorio (born 1961), Colombian footballer
- Juan Felipe Osorio (born 1995), Colombian cyclist
- Julio Osorio (1939–2022), Panamanian basketball player
- Juvencio Osorio (1950–2023), Paraguayan footballer
- Kimberly Osorio (born 1974), American journalist and writer
- Luis Osorio (died 1496), Spanish bishop
- Magnifico Osorio (1934–1985), Filipino priest and human rights activist
- Manuel Luís Osório, Marquis of Erval (1808–1879), Brazilian military officer and politician
- Marco Osorio (born 1972), Mexican tennis player
- Marco Osório (born 1979), Portuguese footballer
- Mariano Osorio (1777–1819), Spanish general
- Miguel Ángel Osorio (disambiguation), several people
- Néstor Osorio Londoño, Colombian diplomat
- Nicholas Osorio (born 1998), Canadian soccer player
- Óscar Osorio (1910–1969), Salvadoran politician
- Pedro Colón Osorio, Puerto Rican politician
- Pedro Pablo Osorio (born 1965), Mexican footballer
- Pepón Osorio, Puerto Rican artist
- Raúl Osorio (born 1995), Chilean footballer
- Ricardo Osorio (born 1980), Mexican footballer
- Rodrigo de Castro Osorio (1523–1600), Spanish bishop
- Rodrigo Osorio (c.1968–2014), Salvadoran footballer
- Saturnino Osorio (1945–1980), Salvadoran footballer
- Sonia Osorio (1928–2011), Colombian dancer and choreographer
- Sulpicio Osório (1898–1970), Filipino editor and writer
- Tomás Luís Osório (died 1763), Portuguese colonel
- Tomás Mejías Osorio (born 1989), Spanish footballer
- Víctor Osorio (footballer) (born 1984), Chilean footballer
- William Osorio (1971–2026), Salvadoran footballer
- Yordan Osorio (born 1994), Venezuelan footballer

== Given name ==
- Osório Carvalho (born 1981), Angolan footballer
- Osorio Martínez (c. 1100–1160), Spanish magnate
- Osório Pereira (1905–1991), Brazilian rower
