= Fernando Marroni =

- Marroni in 2024

Mayor of Pelotas
- Incumbent
- Assumed office January 1, 2025
- Vice mayor: Dani Brizolara
- Preceded by: Paula Mascarenhas
- In office January 1, 2001 – January 1, 2005
- Preceded by: José Anselmo Rodrigues
- Succeeded by: Bernardo de Souza

CEO of the Empresa de Trens Urbanos de Porto Alegre
- In office July 8, 2023 – June 5, 2024
- Succeeded by: Ernani Fagundes (interim)

State deputy for Rio Grande do Sul
- In office February 1, 2019 – February 1, 2023

Federal deputy for Rio Grande do Sul
- In office February 1, 1999 – December 31, 2000
- In office January 6, 2009 – April 2, 2014
- In office February 9, 2015 – October 5, 2015

Personal details
- Born: Fernando Stephan Marroni; 31 July 1956 (age 70) Pelotas, Rio Grande do Sul
- Party: PT (1989–present)
- Spouse: Miriam Marroni
- Education: Catholic University of Pelotas (Note: Some sources report that Marroni studied at UFPel, while others at UCPel. In an Instagram post, he himself stated that he completed his education at the latter.)
- Occupation: electrical engineer, politician and trade unionist

Fernando Stephan Marroni (Pelotas, July 31, 1956) is a Brazilian electrical engineer, politician and trade unionist. A member of the Workers' Party (PT), he is the current mayor of Pelotas, a position he held between 2001 and 2005 and again from 2025. He was also a federal deputy in three separate periods (1999–2000, 2009–2014, 2015), a state deputy in one legislature (2019–2023), and CEO of the Empresa de Trens Urbanos de Porto Alegre (Trensurb) between 2023 and 2024.

An administrative public servant at the Federal University of Pelotas (UFPel), Marroni began his political career in the trade union movement as president of the UFPel Employees' Association (Asufpel) and of the Federation of Workers of Brazilian Universities (Fasubra). A member of the PT, he ran for city councilor in 1992, winning the first alternate position. In the following election, he ran for mayor, reaching the runoff against José Anselmo Rodrigues, who won that election. In 1998, he was elected as the fifth most voted federal deputy of the party in Rio Grande do Sul.

== Personal life ==
Fernando Stephan Marroni was born in Pelotas, Rio Grande do Sul, on July 31, 1956, the son of a teacher. He studied electrical engineering at the Catholic University of Pelotas (UCPel). He became a public servant at the Federal University of Pelotas (UFPel) in 1978. He is married to psychologist and politician Miriam Marroni, with whom he has two daughters.

== Career ==
=== 1987–2000: Beginning of political career and first elections ===
Marroni began his political career at the UCPel Academic Center, later moving into the trade union movement through the UFPel Employees' Association (Asufpel), which he presided over between 1987 and 1991. In 1989, he took over the national leadership of the Federation of Workers of Brazilian Universities (Fasubra); in the same year, he joined the Workers' Party (PT).

He ran for public office for the first time in 1992, when he was elected as an alternate city councilor. He attracted a large number of members to the party, being chosen to run for mayor in 1996 — which sparked internal debate among party members who did not consider him a strong candidate. Despite this, he reached the runoff — held for the first time in the city — against former mayor José Anselmo Rodrigues, who won with a 3.6% vote advantage.

With a performance considered surprising in the municipal election, Marroni became a prominent figure within the party, competing for internal positions. In the 1998 state elections, he was elected federal deputy with more than 47,000 votes – the fifth most voted for the PT in the state. During his term, he emphasized issues related to Pelotas in his speeches, already aiming for a future mayoral candidacy. This time, there was a concrete possibility of the party achieving victory; opinion polls were conducted in which Marroni appeared as the likely winner, which propelled him to win the party primaries. Thus, he was elected mayor of Pelotas in the 2000 election, after contesting the runoff against Leila Fetter (PPB), with 52.94% (94,953) of the votes. In his place in the Federal Chamber entered Ana Corso.

=== 2001–2005: Mayor of Pelotas ===
Marroni arrived at the city hall at a time of instability in local politics. The mayor elected in 1996, Anselmo, was removed from office for 18 months due to allegations of administrative misconduct from a parliamentary inquiry commission; after a long legal dispute, he was reinstated in July 2000, on the eve of the election, which was reflected in his reelection attempt: fourth place. That said, the main banner defended by the new administration was that of popular participation, through participatory budgeting (OP), inspired by the one implemented by Olívio Dutra in Porto Alegre. Based on the OP, the "Pelotas Metrópole" project was created, in which the city government sought funds from the World Bank for infrastructure works – but these incentives were only authorized during the government of Fetter Júnior (PP), in 2007. Despite this, the way the OP was carried out in the municipality was considered disorganized. In addition, his government implemented the Mobile Emergency Care Service in the city; built two health centers, the emergency room and the Hemocentro Regional de Pelotas; and organized a hunger-fighting program in socially vulnerable neighborhoods.

The composition of the government was complicated, as several party tendencies disagreed with the choice of the secretariat. This led to a major overhaul of the secretariats already in his second year in office – seen by some party members as a way to remove more critical members from the administration, which was denied by others closer to the mayor. The government's relationship with the City Council was also mixed. Some government stances also caused friction within its support base and society. Among the main conflicts were the change in municipal employee contracts, which lost some benefits; a new bidding process for public transport lines and the adoption of an electronic turnstile system – after popular pressure, the City Council approved a bill prohibiting the installation of turnstiles, vetoed by Marroni, but whose veto was overridden; the implementation of Saturday afternoon work, a long-standing demand of shopkeepers but unwanted by the Commerce Workers' Union. Years after the end of his term, Marroni was acquitted by the Supreme Federal Court of a criminal charge for waiving bidding when signing an agreement with a company to manage the municipal quarry.

Meanwhile, vice-mayor Mário Filho broke with the government itself after discovering that the PT did not intend to re-run the winning ticket from 2000 for the next election, causing him to be removed from the municipal secretariats he held. In an episode that gained media attention, he set up an office in Praça Coronel Pedro Osório — in front of the City Hall headquarters — alleging that Marroni had taken away his physical workspace. Angered, he announced that he would run for mayor that year, definitively breaking with the current administration. In this context, Marroni ran for reelection in 2004 with the support of the Frente Popular (PT/PL/PCdoB) and city councilor Adelar Bayer as vice. He won the first round with 35.97% (68,669) of the votes, but was surpassed in the second round by Bernardo de Souza (PPS), a former mayor who received support from most of the other parties and totaled 52.38% (100,088) of the votes.

=== 2006–2018: Return to the Federal Chamber and reelection attempts ===
After failing to win reelection as mayor, he ran again for the Chamber of Deputies in 2006 and, with 70,000 votes, became first alternate, being sworn in on January 6, 2009. During this period, he advocated that then-president Luiz Inácio Lula da Silva could run again for the office in 2010 for a possible third consecutive term and allocated a parliamentary amendment for the expansion of the Hospital Universitário São Francisco de Paula. In this legislature, he was a member of the standing committees on Science and Technology, Communication and Informatics; Urban Development and Interior; Education, Culture and Sports; Environment and Sustainable Development; Mines and Energy; Public Security and Combating Organized Crime; Labor, Administration and Public Service; and Transportation and Transit.

In 2008, he ran again for mayor with the support of the Frente Popular coalition (PT/PSB/PCdoB) and with radio host Otávio Soares as vice. The incumbent mayor was Fetter Júnior (PP), elected vice on Bernardo's ticket in 2004, but who took office shortly after due to the incumbent's health problems and was seeking reelection. As in the previous election, Marroni won the first round with 33.71% (65,109) of the votes. Fetter and Marroni had a fierce campaign against each other, intensified when both advanced to the runoff. In his party political broadcast, the PT candidate had testimonials in his favor from, among others, Anselmo Rodrigues, former mayor and also a candidate, and Cesar Victora, a scientist. He also received visits from then-ministers Tarso Genro and Dilma Rousseff. The main issue of contention involved the authorship of the "Pelotas Metrópole" project (at that time renamed "Pelotas Polo do Sul"), proposed in Marroni's government and implemented in Fetter's; both candidates claimed it for themselves. However, Marroni was again overtaken in the runoff, finishing the race with 43.28% (83,193) of the votes.

In 2010, Marroni was reelected federal deputy with more than 87,000 votes — the most voted Pelotas candidate for the Federal Chamber of all time up to then. However, he became an alternate after Maria do Rosário (PT) had her votes validated; he took office after Rosário left for the Secretariat of Human Rights in 2011, remaining until her return to the Chamber in 2014. In this legislature, he was a member of the standing committees on Science, Technology and Innovation; Environment and Sustainable Development; Transportation and Transit; Participatory Legislation; Urban Development; Foreign Affairs and National Defense; Health; Agriculture, Livestock, Supply and Rural Development; and Culture.

In the 2012 election, he ran for mayor for the fifth consecutive time. His main adversary in the race was Eduardo Leite (PSDB), who represented the largest coalition in the election and the same one that had won in 2004 and 2008. He received visits from then-ministers Alexandre Padilha, José Eduardo Cardozo, Fernando Pimentel and governor Tarso, while Dilma and Lula recorded messages for his political broadcast. He finished the first round in second place, with 28.54% (55,111) of the votes. Pelotas was the only city in Rio Grande do Sul to hold a runoff that year. Marroni also finished the runoff in second place, with 42.85% (83,079) of the votes, being surpassed in both by Leite.

In 2014, he was reelected federal deputy, but again became an alternate, losing the seat to José Otávio Germano (PP). The change occurred because the Superior Electoral Court validated the 45,559 votes of candidate Claudio Janta (SD), who was part of the same coalition as Germano, altering the electoral quotient, which determines the number of votes for each seat in the Chamber. With Pepe Vargas (PT) leaving to become a minister of state, Marroni took the parliamentary seat in February 2015, remaining until Pepe's return in October of the same year. In this legislature, he was a member of the standing committees on Foreign Affairs and National Defense; Transportation and Transit; and Mines and Energy.

In the 2016 municipal election, for the first time in 20 years, Fernando was not the PT candidate for mayor. Instead, his wife, Miriam, ran and finished the race in fourth place, with 6.42% of the votes. In 2020, disagreeing with the party's decision not to hold primary elections, he withdrew his candidacy even though he was considered the strongest name of the party for that election. The PT launched city councilor Ivan Duarte as its mayoral candidate, who reached the runoff but was not elected.

=== 2019–2024: Legislative Assembly and Trensurb ===
In 2018, he was elected state deputy of Rio Grande do Sul, with 0.53% of valid votes (30,704 votes). As a state legislator, he authored – together with Zé Nunes (PT) – the bill (PL) that established the Costa Doce tourist region in RS, in addition to being vice-president of the Education, Culture, Sports, Science and Technology Committee of the Legislative Assembly of Rio Grande do Sul. He also created the bill "Maria da Penha Week in Schools", which aims to encourage reflection in schools about violence against women. He ran for reelection in 2022, but finished as fourth alternate of the Brazil of Hope Federation (FE Brasil), with 28,884 votes.

In 2023, he was appointed CEO of the Empresa de Trens Urbanos de Porto Alegre (Trensurb) by President Lula. During his inauguration, he highlighted as points to be worked on in his administration the appreciation of employees and the adoption of a more environmentally sustainable model, in addition to criticizing what he called the "scrapping" of the company in previous governments. He also guaranteed that the entity would not be privatized and that he would work to remove it from the National Privatization Program, in which it had been placed during the Jair Bolsonaro's presidency, a promise that was fulfilled in March 2024. He left the position in June 2024 to run again for mayor of Pelotas; he was succeeded on an interim basis by Ernani Fagundes and permanently by Nazur Garcia.

=== 2024–present: Mayor of Pelotas ===
After a hiatus of two municipal elections, in 2024 Marroni launched his sixth candidacy for mayor of Pelotas, with the support of the Nova Frente Popular coalition (FE Brasil/PSOL REDE) and with Daniela Brizolara (PSOL) as vice, marking the first time that the PT and PSOL allied in the first round of a municipal election. During the campaign, he presented himself with a renewal discourse, declaring dissatisfaction with the fact that the city had been governed by the same coalition since the end of his term, in 2005. Two opinion polls were released before the elections, both of which indicated the PT candidate's lead and his possible victory in the runoff. On the other hand, they also showed him as the candidate with the highest rejection rate (31.9%). He finished the first round in first place with 39.6% (68,443) of the votes. For the runoff, he received a wide range of support, including from governor and former mayor Eduardo Leite, former mayor Irajá Rodrigues and then-mayor Paula Mascarenhas. Thus, he won the election in the runoff by defeating Marciano Perondi (PL), with 50.36% (87,737) of the votes, returning to office after twenty years.

== Public image ==
During his mayoral campaign in 2000, a controversy erupted after the leak of a video in which Lula called the city of Pelotas an "exporter of faggots" in a meeting with Marroni. The repercussion was such that, in addition to being used by Marroni's opponents, the video was even broadcast in the political broadcast of Paulo Maluf in the São Paulo municipal election of the same year, and the two politicians involved apologized to the population. In his reelection attempt in 2004, a video of Marroni mocking the floods that hit the city that year was released by the PT itself, in order to prevent new political use by adversaries. According to his campaign coordinator, the mayor had only used a figure of speech when there were no longer risks related to the event.

== Bibliography ==
- Borges Junior, Lauro Luis (2009). Dangerous relations: the PT and the municipal government of Pelotas (2001-2004) (PDF) (dissertation). Federal University of Pelotas.
- Loureiro Duarte Bertinetti, Mariana (2012). Political discourse in television media: an analysis of the runoff of the 2008 elections for the Mayor of Pelotas (dissertation). Federal University of Pelotas.
- Sabbado, Laís Soares (2010). Agenda power at the local level: a comparative analysis of the legislative production of two governments of Pelotas, RS (2001-2008) (PDF) (dissertation). Federal University of Pelotas.
