= Osorio (disambiguation) =

Osorio is a given name and surname.

Osorio or Osório may also refer to:

== People ==
- Manuel Luís Osório, Marquis of Erval (May 10, 1808 – October 4, 1879), Brazilian military officer, monarchist and politician
- António Mota de Sousa Horta Osório (b. 1964), businessman

== Places ==
- Osório, Rio Grande do Sul, a city in Rio Grande do Sul, Brazil
- Pedro Osório, a municipality in Rio Grande do Sul, Brazil
- Acatlán de Osorio, a town in Puebla, Mexico

== Other uses ==
- Osorio (play), a play by Samuel Taylor Coleridge
- EE-T1 Osório, Brazilian battle tank

== See also ==
- Osor (disambiguation)
