= Osor =

Osor may refer to these places and jurisdictions :

- Osor, Croatia, town, former bishopric and present Latin Catholic titular see
- Osor, Girona, village in Catalonia
- Bishop of Osor
- Open Source Observatory and Repository

== See also ==
- Osorio (disambiguation)
- Osorno (disambiguation)
