= Michel Bierlaire =

Belgian–Swiss applied mathematician

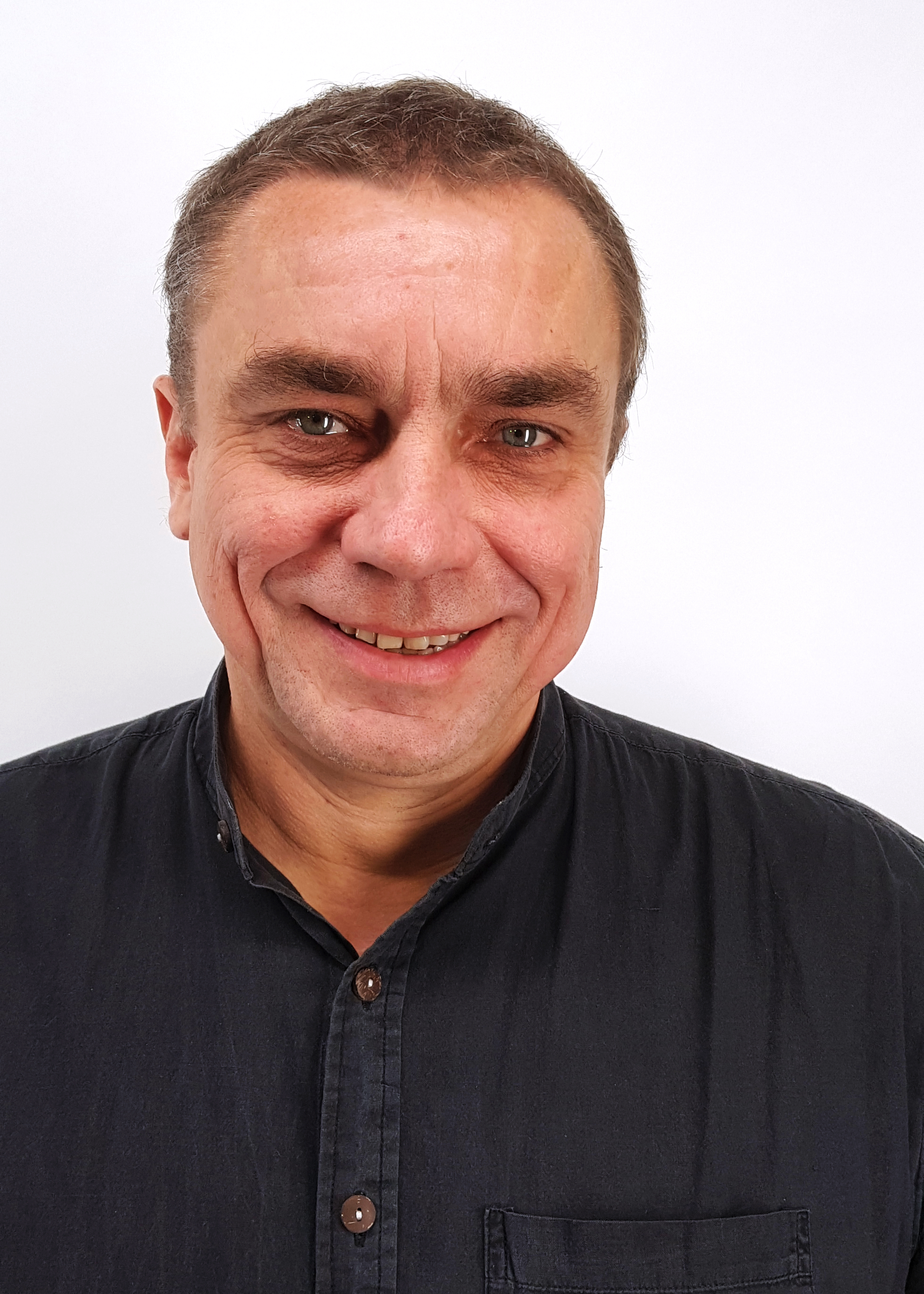
- Bierlaire in 2020
- Born: February 9, 1967 (age 59); Namur, Belgium
- Citizenship: Belgium; Switzerland
- Known for: Discrete-choice modelling; DynaMIT; Biogeme

Academic background
- Education: University of Namur
- Thesis: Mathematical models for transportation demand analysis (1996)
- Doctoral advisor: Philippe Toint

Academic work
- Discipline: Applied mathematics; transport modelling
- Institutions: École Polytechnique Fédérale de Lausanne (EPFL)
- Doctoral students: Carolina Osorio
- Website: https://www.epfl.ch/labs/transp-or/

Michel Bierlaire (born 9 February 1967) is a Belgian-Swiss applied mathematician specialising in transportation systems. He is Professor of Operations Research at the École Polytechnique Fédérale de Lausanne (EPFL) and directs the university’s Transport and Mobility Laboratory.

== Education ==
Bierlaire studied mathematics at the University of Namur, obtaining his PhD in 1996 for research on transportation-demand models supervised by Philippe Toint.

== Career ==
From 1995 to 1998 he was a research associate in the Intelligent Transportation Systems Program at the Massachusetts Institute of Technology, where he co-developed DynaMIT, a real-time traffic-prediction tool. Bierlaire joined EPFL in 1998 as a senior scientist, became Associate Professor in 2006 and Full Professor in 2012. He founded the Transport and Mobility Laboratory in 2006 and directed EPFL’s Doctoral Program in Civil and Environmental Engineering from 2009 to 2017. In 2012 he co-founded the European Association for Research in Transportation (hEART) and served as its first president until 2015.

== Research ==
Bierlaire combines discrete-choice theory, operations research and simulation to analyse travel behaviour, design transport policies and evaluate environmental impacts. His methods have been applied to public-transport planning, logistics, pedestrian dynamics and land-use modelling. He leads Biogeme, an open-source Python package for maximum-likelihood estimation of discrete-choice models. Bierlaire created several massive open online courses, including “Introduction to Discrete Choice Models” on edX, and co-teaches the professional course “Discrete Choice Analysis: Predicting Individual Behaviour and Market Demand” with colleagues from MIT and UC Berkeley.

== Honours and service ==
- Founding Editor-in-Chief, EURO Journal on Transportation and Logistics (2011–2019)
- Associate Editor, Operations Research (since 2012)

== Selected publications ==
- Bierlaire, M. Optimization: Principles and Algorithms. EPFL Press, 2015.
- Fosgerau, M.; McFadden, D.; Bierlaire, M. “Choice Probability Generating Functions.” Journal of Choice Modelling 8 (2013): 1–18.
- Bierlaire, M.; Chen, J.; Newman, J. “A Probabilistic Map Matching Method for Smartphone GPS Data.” Transportation Research Part C 26 (2013): 78–98.
