= Marciano Perondi =

Brazilian politician (born 1983)

- Perondi in 2024

Member-elect of the Chamber of Deputies
- Assuming office 1 February 2027
- Constituency: Rio Grande do Sul

Personal details
- Born: 26 June 1983 (age 43) Descanso, Santa Catarina, Brazil
- Party: PL (since 2024)
- Profession: Lawyer

Marciano Perondi (born 26 June 1983) is a Brazilian politician who was elected member of the Chamber of Deputies in 2026. In the 2024 municipal elections, he was a candidate for mayor of Pelotas.
