= Pelotas =

Place in south Brazil

- Municipality
- Municipality of Pelotas
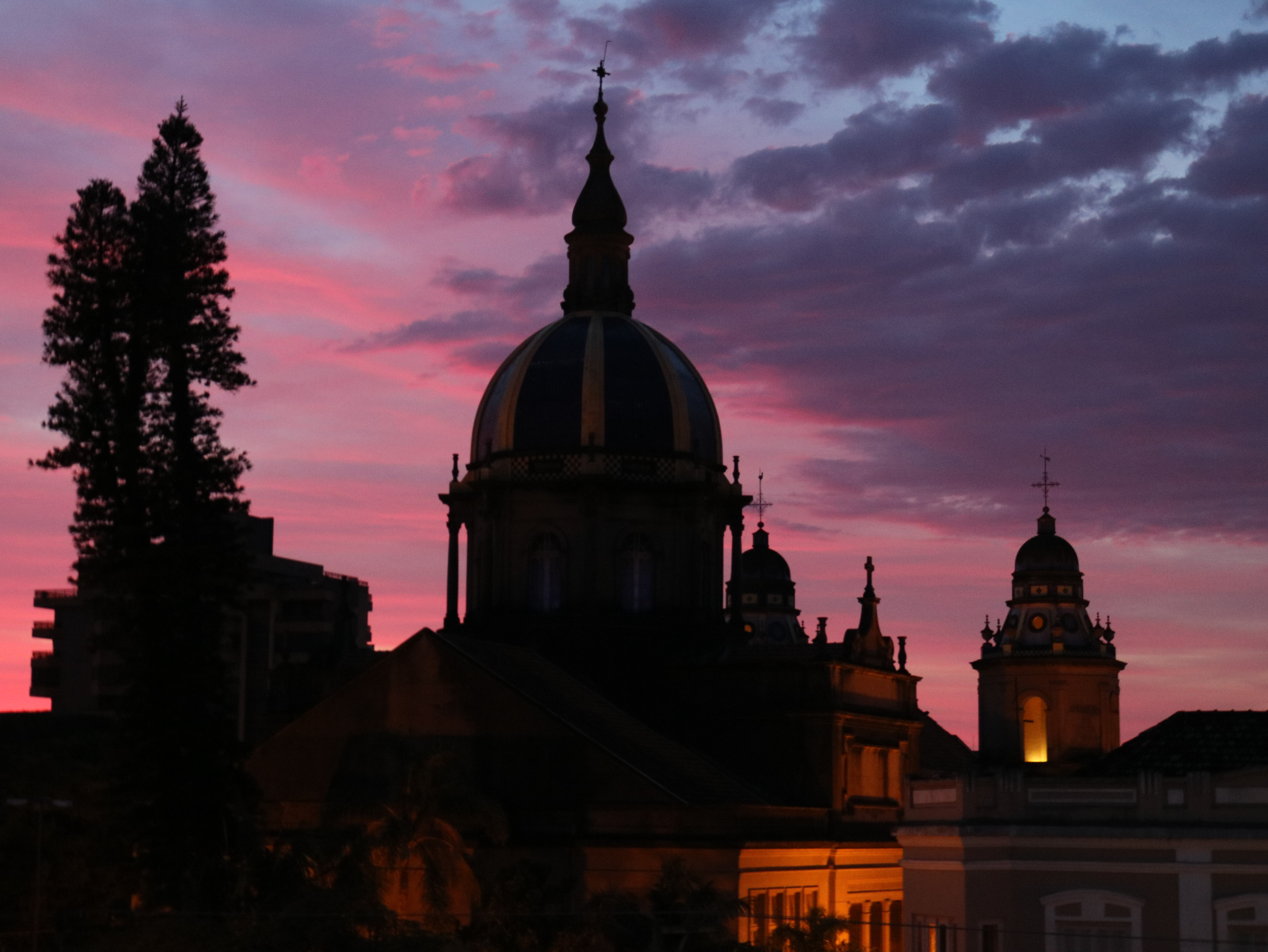
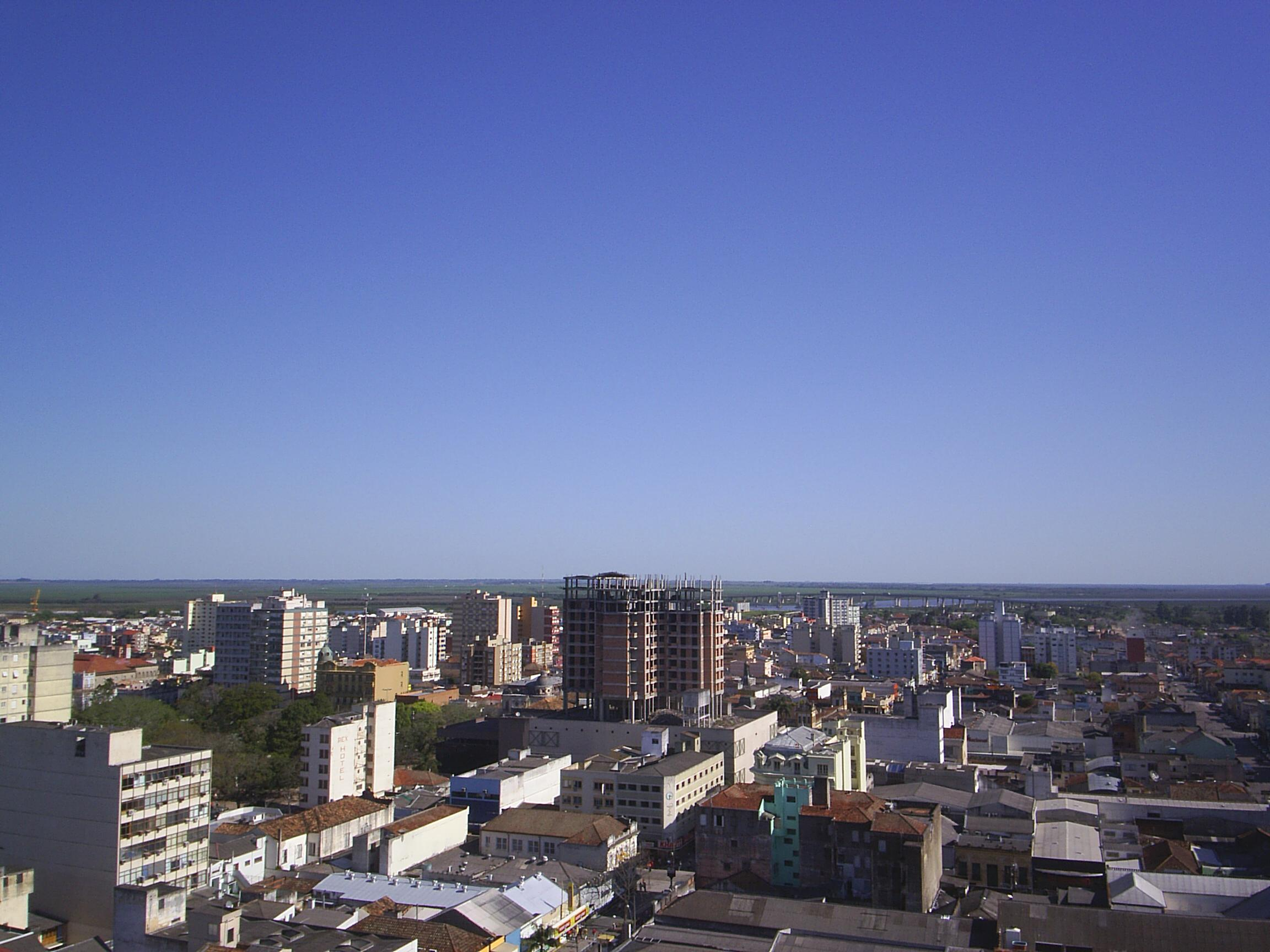
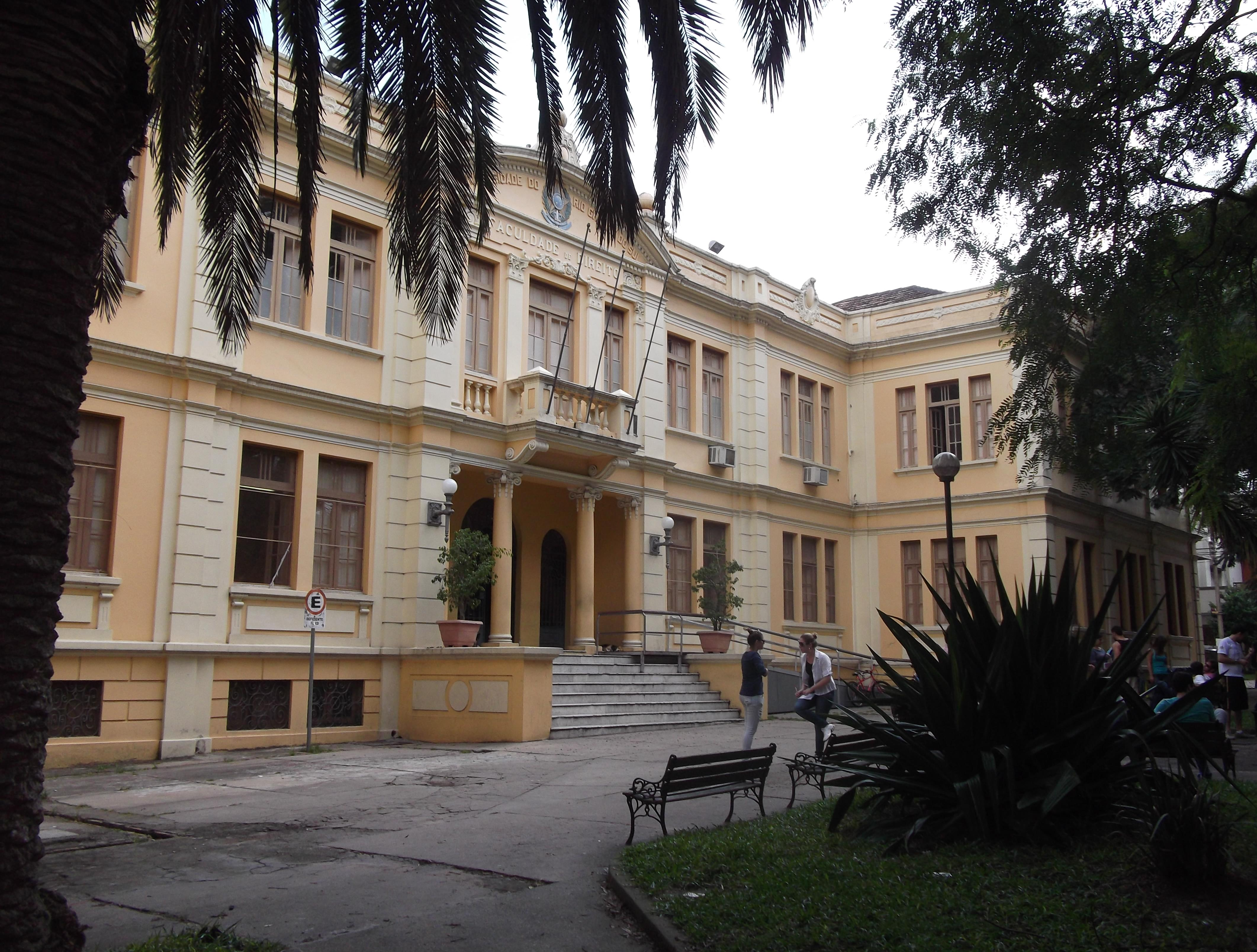
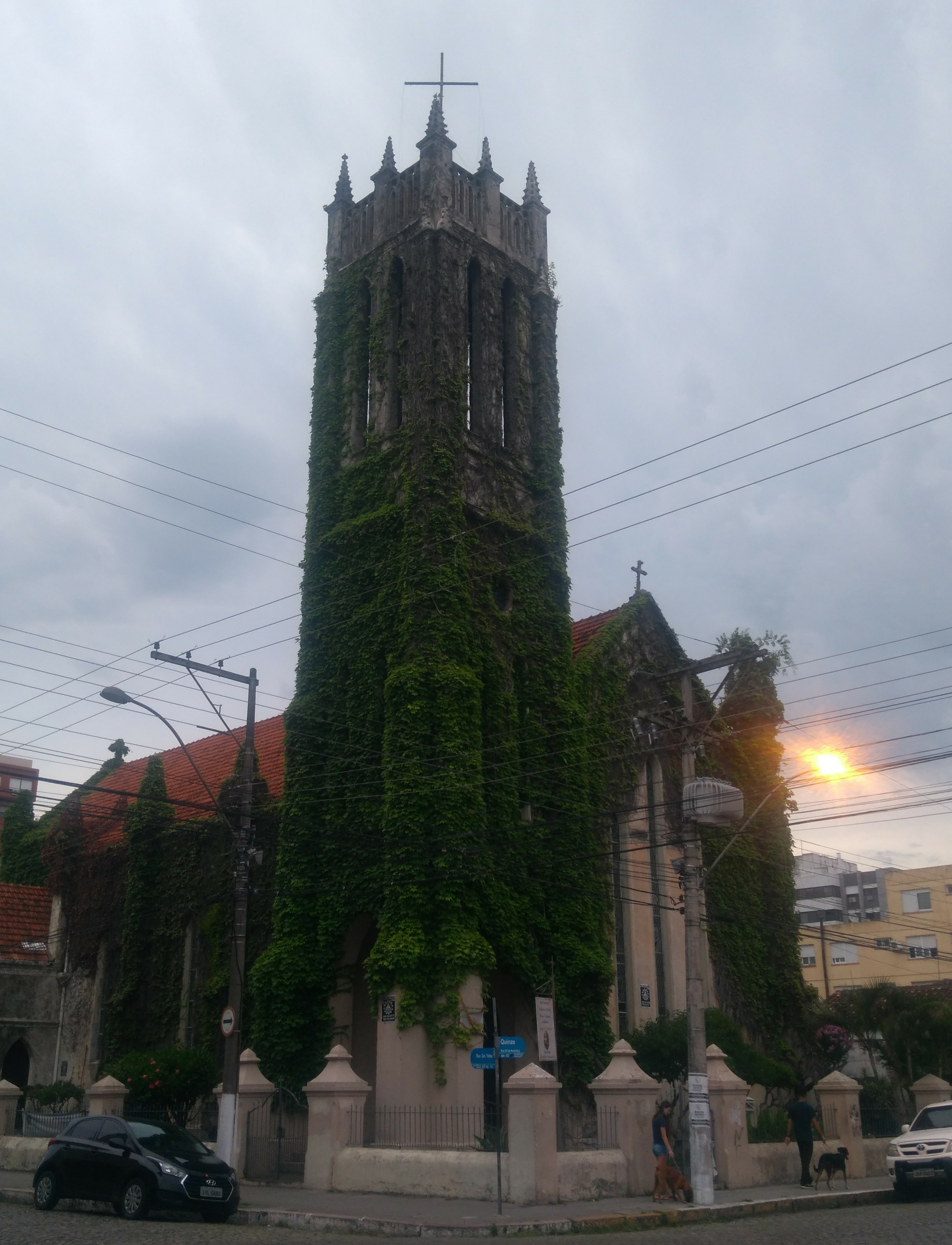
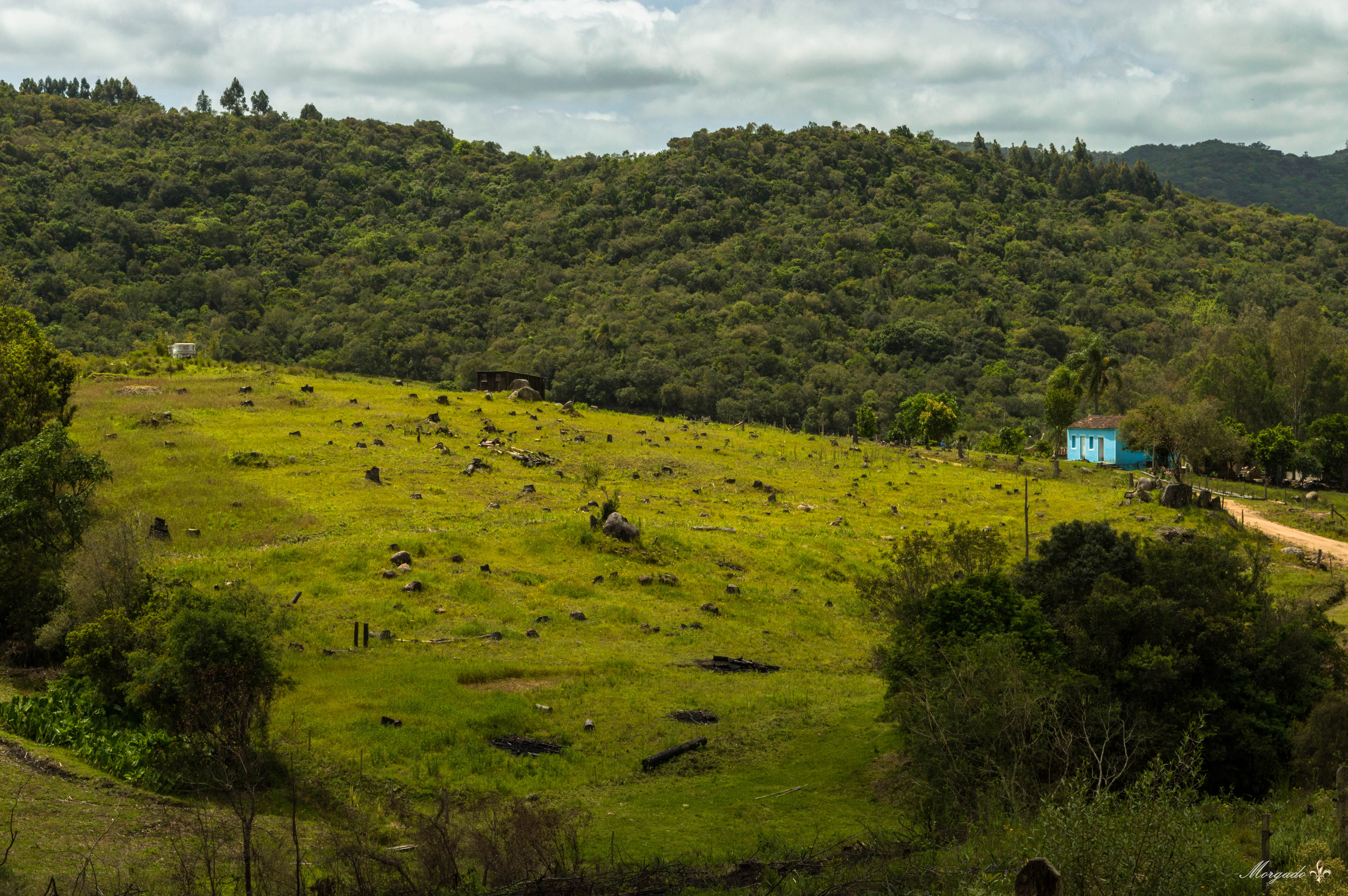
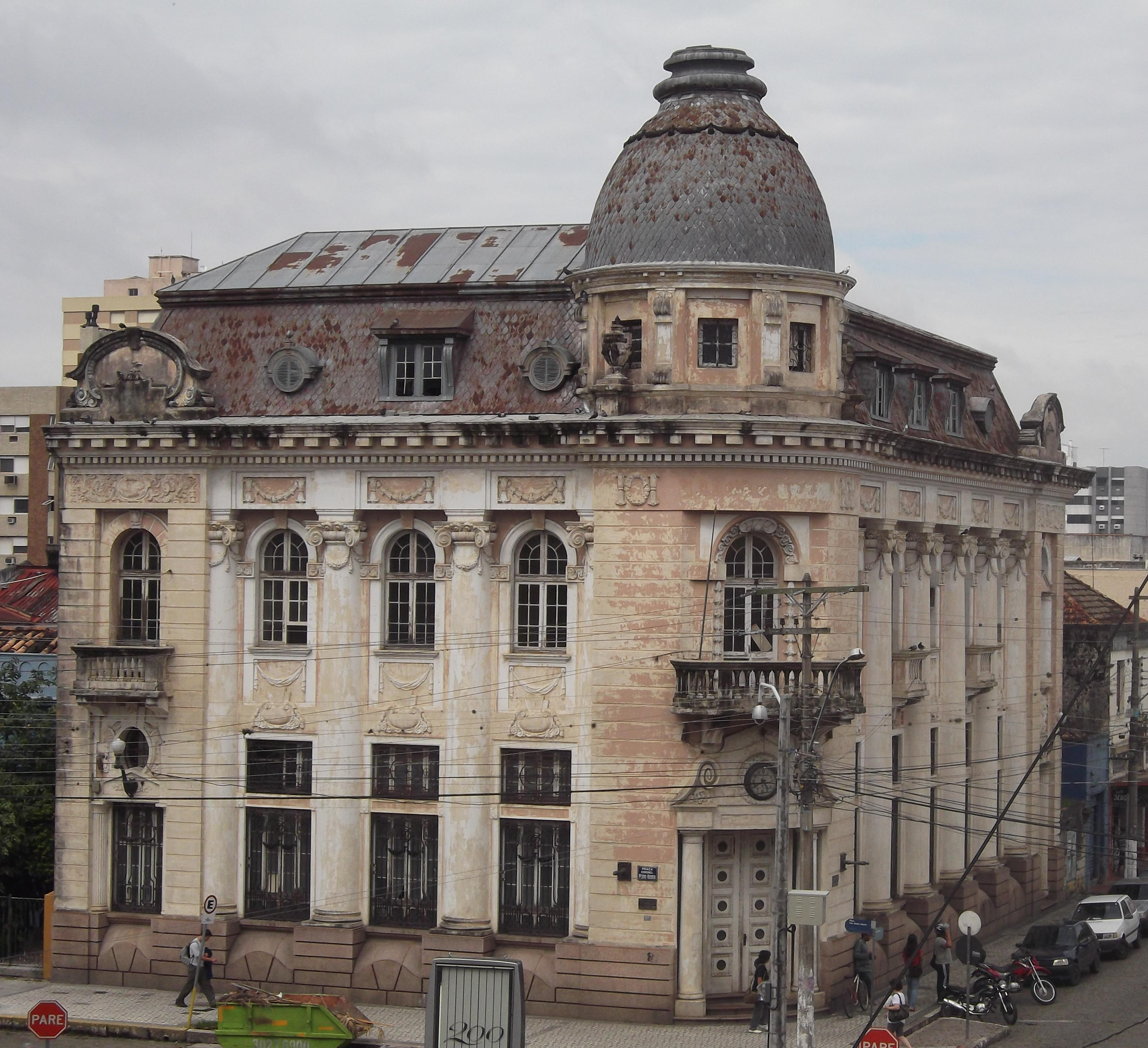
- Clockwise from top left: dome of the Metropolitan Cathedral of São Francisco de Paula; partial view of downtown Pelotas; Law Faculty of the Federal University of Pelotas; Anglican Cathedral of the Redeemer; countryside in Quilombo District; and Bank of Brazil

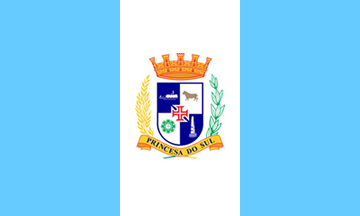
- Flag Coat of arms
- Nickname: Princess of the South
- Location in Rio Grande do Sul, Brazil

- Location in Brazil
- Coordinates: 31°46′19″S 52°20′33″W
- Country: Brazil
- Region: South
- State: Rio Grande do Sul
- Founded: 1812
- Incorporated: 1832 (town)
- 1835 (city)

Government
  - Mayor: Fernando Marroni (PT)
  - Deputy Mayor: Dani Brizolara

Area
  - Total: 1,609 km^{2} (621 sq mi)
- Elevation: 7 m (23 ft)
- Highest elevation: 429 m (1,407 ft)
- Lowest elevation: 0 m (0 ft)

Population (2022 Brazilian census)
  - Total: 325,685
  - Estimate (2025): 336,150
  - Density: 202.4/km^{2} (524.3/sq mi)
- Demonym: Pelotense
- Time zone: UTC−3 (BRT)
- Website: Prefeitura de Pelotas

Pelotas (Brazilian Portuguese pronunciation: [peˈlɔtɐs]) is a Brazilian city and municipality (município), the fourth most populous in the southern state of Rio Grande do Sul, after Porto Alegre, Caxias do Sul and Canoas. It is located 270 km (168 mi) from Porto Alegre, the state's capital city, and 130 km (80.8 mi) from the Uruguayan border. The Lagoa dos Patos lies to the east and the São Gonçalo Channel lies to the south, separating Pelotas from the municipality of Rio Grande.

In the 19th century, Pelotas was Brazil's leading center for the production of dried meat (charque), a staple food made by slaves and destined to feed the slaves of sugarcane, coffee and cocoa plantations across the country.

Currently Pelotas hosts two major universities, the Federal University of Pelotas, and the Catholic University of Pelotas. Together, they account for a population of 22,000 higher education students.

The city has three football clubs: Esporte Clube Pelotas (founded 1908), Grêmio Esportivo Brasil (also known as Brasil de Pelotas; founded 1911) and Grêmio Atlético Farroupilha (founded 1926).

== History ==
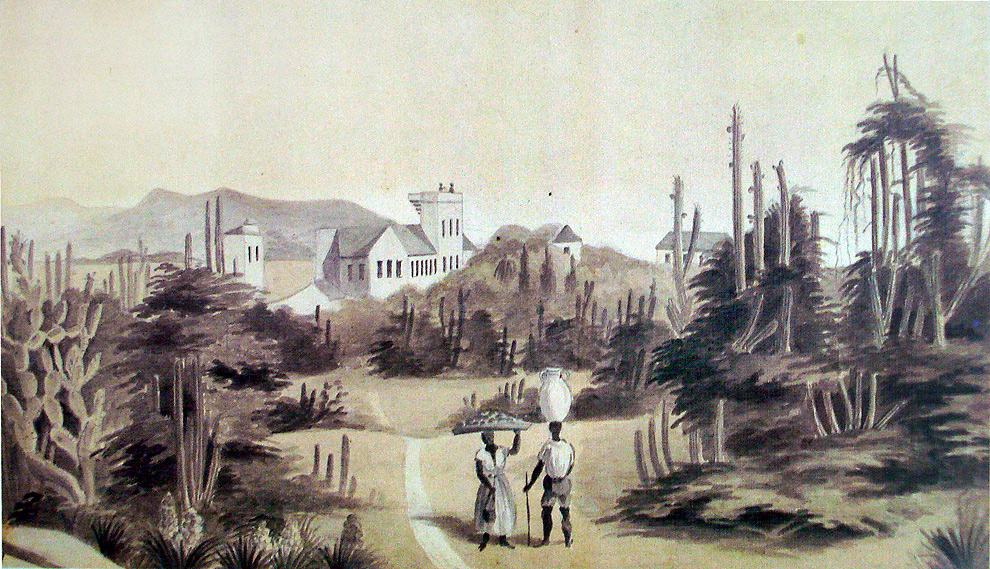
Pelotas in 1852, by Herrmann Rudolf Wendroth

The history of the city begins in June 1758, through a donation that Gomes Freire de Andrade, Count of Bobadela, made to Colonel Thomáz Luiz Osório, giving him land that lay on the banks of the Lagoa dos Patos. In 1763, fleeing the Spanish invasion, many inhabitants of the village Rio Grande sought refuge in the land belonging to Osório. Later, there also came refugees from Colônia do Sacramento, which had been handed over by the Portuguese to the Spanish in 1777.

In 1780, the Portuguese rancher José Pinto Martins established himself in Pelotas, with the prosperity of his establishment stimulating the creation of other ranches and growth in the region, creating a population that would define the early city.

The Civil Parish of São Francisco de Paula, founded on 7 June 1812, by Father Pedro Pereira de Mesquita, was elevated to the category of town on 7 April 1832. Three years later, in 1835, the town was declared a city, bearing the name Pelotas.

In southern Brazil, 'pelota' can refer to a leather raft, and the name of the city comes from the boats made of cockspur coral tree covered with animal skins, used to cross rivers in ranching times.

In the first years of the 20th century, progress was stimulated by the Banco Pelotense (Bank of Pelotas), founded in 1906 by local investors. Its liquidation, in 1931, was devastating to the local economy.

In 1990, the Urban Conurbation of Pelotas was created as a result of a state law. In 2001, it became the Urban Conurbation of Pelotas and Rio Grande, and in 2002 the Urban Conurbation of the South. The goal is to integrate the participating towns and is the embryo of a future metropolitan region including the towns os Arroio do Padre, Capão do Leão, Pelotas, Rio Grande and São José do Norte, which have a total population of around 600,000 inhabitants.

== Geography ==
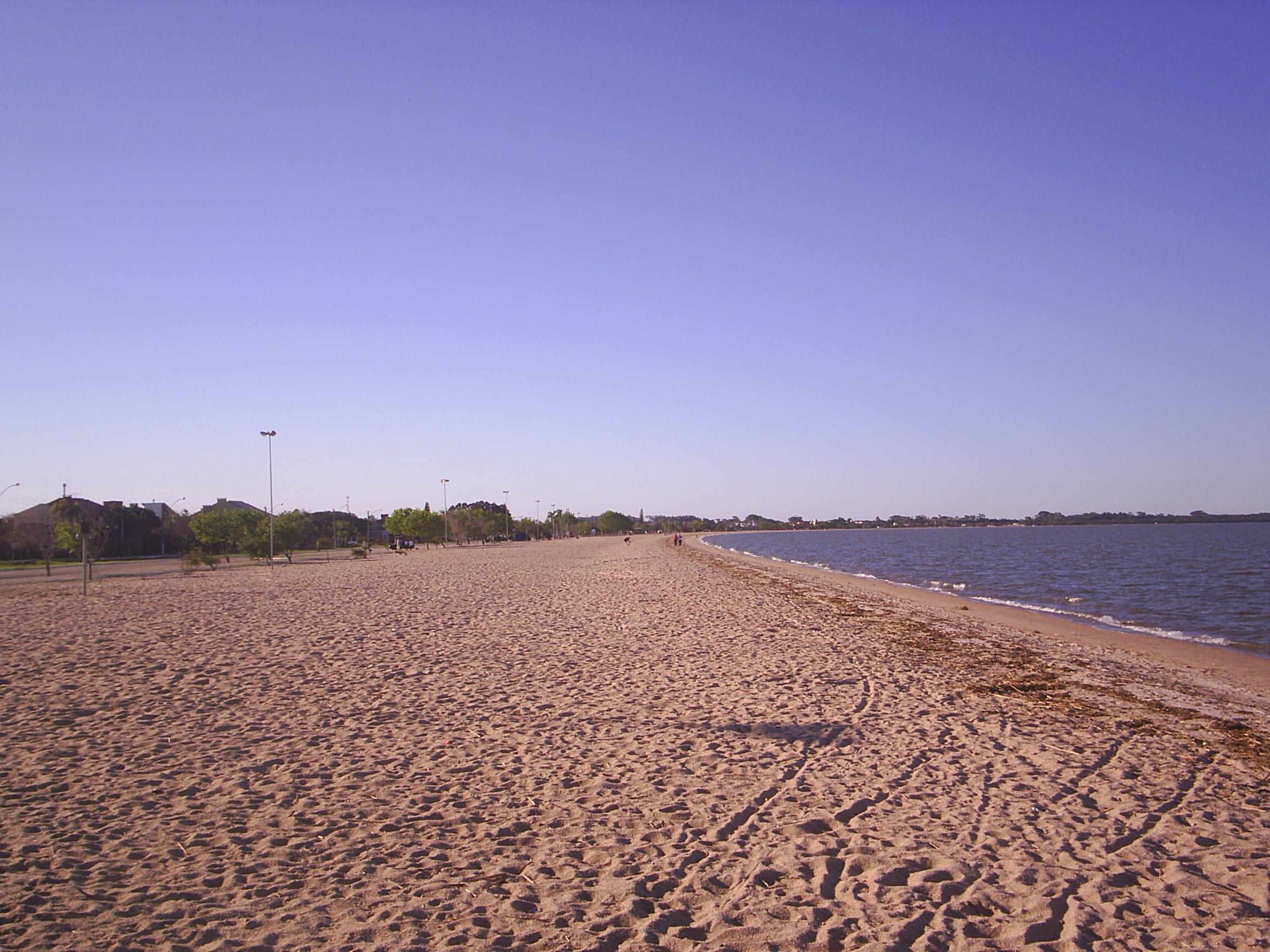
The Laranjal on the coast of the Lagoa dos Patos

=== Topography ===
As it is situated on a plain near the ocean, the urban area lies on a low elevation, being, on average, 7 meters (23 ft) above sea level. The interior of the municipality is on a plateau called Serras de Sudeste (Southeastern Mountain Ranges). Consequently, the altitude in Pelotas' rural area reaches 429 meters (1,407.4 ft) in the Quilombo district.

The city stretches to the Laranjal, a bairro on the coast of the Lagoa dos Patos. Beyond the coastal regions Santo Antônio and Valverde, the area also has an even more remote area, the Balneário dos Prazeres (popularly known as Barro Duro, lit. "hard mud"), and Colônia Z-3, a fishing village that primarily explores the art of shrimping.

=== Climate ===
The climate is humid subtropical (Köppen: Cfa), a type found in Southeastern Australia (very homogeneous to Sydney, in terms of average temperatures, albeit cloudier and wetter), without major temperature deviations as found in other cities at the same latitude, elevation and near some ocean, like Brunswick and Savannah, Georgia (USA), and in Shanghai, China (but still considered very high by Brazilian standards), due to the continentality and polar vortex position in those southern cities of the United States and the Chinese city. Summers are warm to hot with regular rainfall. Winters are cool with episodic frosts (about 24 per year) and fog, with no noticeable difference in the amount of monthly rainfall.

The hottest month is January, with an average temperature of 23 °C (73.4 °F), and the coldest month is July, with an average temperature of 12 °C (53.6 °F). The wettest month is February, with 145 mm (5.7 in) of precipitation. The average annual temperature in the city is 17.5 °C (63.5 °F) and the average annual precipitation is 1,379 mm (54.29 in), with rain regularly falling all year long. The relative humidity is very high (with an annual average around 80%).

An interesting meteorological occurrence was the first snowfall, which occurred on 8 July 1994 in Pelotas from 11:00 am to 1:30 pm. Before this date, there had never been any record of snow in the city. The phenomenon was weaker in the urban parts of the city, and did not cover the ground. However, the snowfall was more intense further inland, in districts such as Cascata and Quilombo, and was able to cover the vegetation in a white blanket. Snow grains were recorded in Pelotas on 4 September 2006, on 5 September 2008, and on 3 August 2010, and graupel was registered on 12 July 2012, and on 25 September 2012. On 5 July 2019, the downtown area of the city registered, for 40 minutes, snow flurries with liquid drizzle, just before noon (with no accumulation). On 28 July 2021, Pelotas registered snow flurries with sleet.

On 19 July 1934 and 27 July 1935, the city recorded a temperature of -5 °C (23 °F), the lowest recorded in Pelotas. The highest recorded temperature in Pelotas was 42 °C (107.6 °F), on 1 January 1943.

Climate data for Pelotas (1991–2020 normals, extremes 1931–present)
Month	Jan	Feb	Mar	Apr	May	Jun	Jul	Aug	Sep	Oct	Nov	Dec	Year
Record high °C (°F)	42.0 (107.6)	39.6 (103.3)	38.4 (101.1)	36.4 (97.5)	33.6 (92.5)	30.8 (87.4)	31.8 (89.2)	34.4 (93.9)	35.6 (96.1)	36.1 (97.0)	37.4 (99.3)	39.6 (103.3)	42.0 (107.6)
Mean daily maximum °C (°F)	28.6 (83.5)	28.4 (83.1)	27.3 (81.1)	24.7 (76.5)	21.1 (70.0)	18.5 (65.3)	17.8 (64.0)	19.3 (66.7)	20.0 (68.0)	22.4 (72.3)	25.1 (77.2)	27.4 (81.3)	23.4 (74.1)
Daily mean °C (°F)	23.5 (74.3)	23.2 (73.8)	21.9 (71.4)	19.0 (66.2)	15.6 (60.1)	13.1 (55.6)	12.3 (54.1)	13.8 (56.8)	15.3 (59.5)	17.9 (64.2)	20.1 (68.2)	22.2 (72.0)	18.2 (64.8)
Mean daily minimum °C (°F)	19.5 (67.1)	19.3 (66.7)	18.0 (64.4)	15.0 (59.0)	11.9 (53.4)	9.4 (48.9)	8.5 (47.3)	9.9 (49.8)	11.6 (52.9)	14.2 (57.6)	15.9 (60.6)	18.0 (64.4)	14.3 (57.7)
Record low °C (°F)	7.6 (45.7)	5.8 (42.4)	3.3 (37.9)	2.7 (36.9)	−0.6 (30.9)	−5.0 (23.0)	−3.4 (25.9)	−2.6 (27.3)	−2.1 (28.2)	1.2 (34.2)	4.0 (39.2)	4.8 (40.6)	−5.0 (23.0)
Average precipitation mm (inches)	115.9 (4.56)	141.8 (5.58)	107.2 (4.22)	111.1 (4.37)	117.1 (4.61)	107.7 (4.24)	112.7 (4.44)	117.4 (4.62)	128.7 (5.07)	120.2 (4.73)	99.4 (3.91)	103.2 (4.06)	1,382.4 (54.43)
Average precipitation days (≥ 1.0 mm)	9	9	9	8	8	7	8	8	9	9	7	8	99
Average relative humidity (%)	78.5	80.7	82.5	83.5	86.2	85.8	84.7	84.1	83.3	81.6	77.4	77.2	82.1
Mean monthly sunshine hours	252.8	215.0	217.2	185.0	166.0	142.9	160.2	169.2	160.7	186.6	233.8	257.5	2,346.9
Source: Instituto Nacional de Meteorologia

=== Vegetation ===
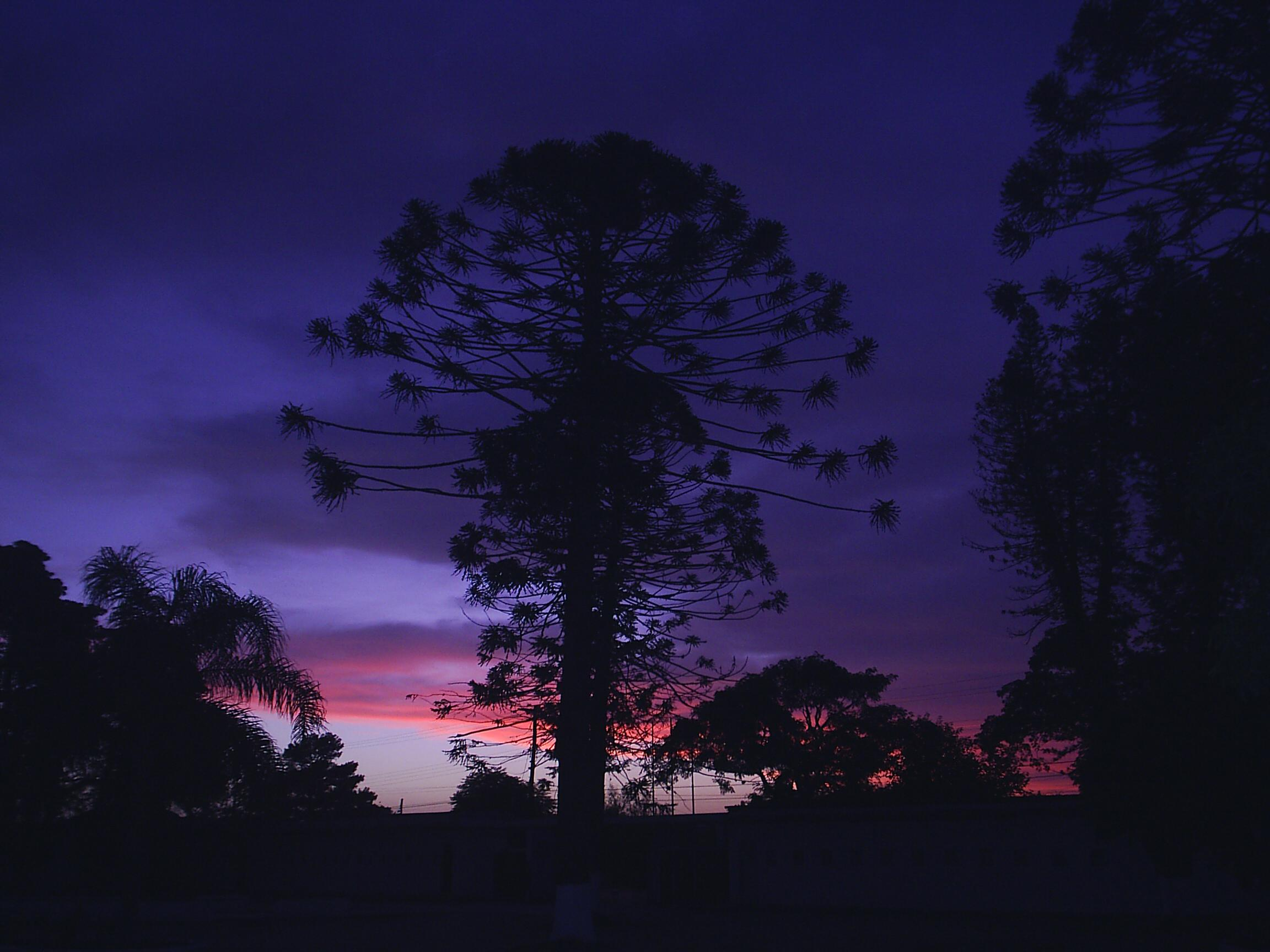
An araucaria tree at dusk near the hippodrome of Pelotas

The larger part of rural Pelotas is made up of grasslands, with low and herbaceous vegetation (pampa). Small groves of cultivated trees (Babylon willow, eucalyptus, pine, cypress, acacia, poplar and platanus) and native trees (Cockspur coral tree and araucaria angustifolia) are also found. Pelotas is 55 km (34 mi) from the Atlantic Ocean, and possesses a beach along the Lagoa dos Patos, called Laranjal. In the vicinity of the beach one can find quagmires and sand dunes.

=== Hydrography ===
Pelotas is part of the watershed of the Camaquã River. The streams Quilombo and Caneleiras drain the city. They meet to form the Arroio de Pelotas, which flows into the São Gonçalo Channel.

== Culture ==
=== Places of interest ===
The Public Library of Pelotas was founded in 1875, and constructed with materials brought over from Europe. Pelotas has two theatres, the Sete de Abril and the Guarani Theatre. The Sete de Abril, which was constructed in 1831, is one of the most traditional theatres in Brazil. The city boasts four major museums: the Carlos Ritter Museum of Natural History, the Leopoldo Gotuzzo Museum of Art, the "Candy Museum", and the Museum of the Baroness.

=== Events ===
One major attraction is the Fenadoce, a display of sweets prepared from traditional 18th century Portuguese recipes. More than 300,000 people come to the annual event, which began in 1986. Formerly held in different locations each year, today it is always celebrated in the Centro Internacional de Cultura e Eventos (International Center of Culture and Events).

== Demographics ==
=== Ethnicities ===
The first immigrants to the region were the Portuguese, coming mostly from the Azores, something which profoundly influenced the culture of the city, especially in its architecture and cuisine.

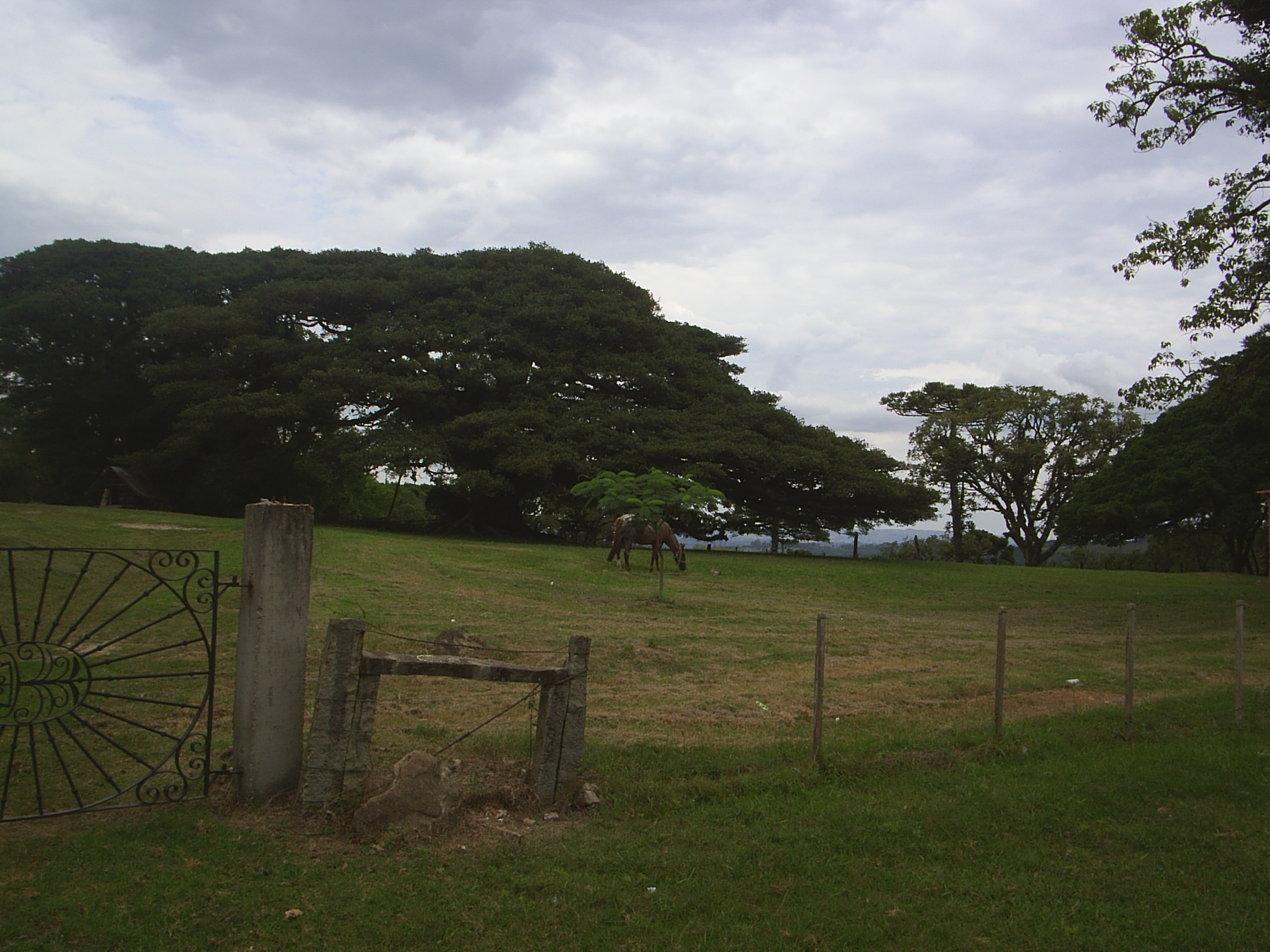
The countryside of Pelotas

Another important immigration was that of the Germans (mainly Pomeranian Germans), even though they preferred to settle in rural areas, unlike the Portuguese, who settled in the city itself. Also worthy to mention are other ethnicities that settled in Pelotas, such as Africans (descendants of slaves, mainly from Angola), Italians, Poles, French, Jews, Lebanese Arabs, etc. The number of pure indigenous people is unknown, but probably very small (being greater the number of people with some indigenous ancestry).

Before the arrival of the first European settlers, the area of the southern part of Rio Grande do Sul, including the municipality of Pelotas, was occupied by Amerindian groups. According to archaeological evidence discovered there, the groups were: Minuane, Charrua and Guaraní.

In the 2022 census there were 247,257 Whites, 38,691 Blacks, 39,107 Pardos (mixed origins), 363 native Brazilians and 264 Asians.

=== Religion ===
In regards to religion, the majority of inhabitants (about 34%) are Roman Catholic, followed by Protestant religions (especially among the people of German origin), such as Evangelical Lutheran and Anglican sects (among Foursquarians, Baptists, Adventists, Presbyterians and Neopentecostal churches). In recent times there has also been a growing number of Jehovah's Witnesses and Latter-day Saints. Other noteworthy religions include Spiritism and Afro-Brazilian ritualism (such as Umbanda, Quimbanda and Candomblé).

The IBGE released, in 2025, statistical data of the 2022 census, concerning about religions in the Brazilian municipalities. In Pelotas, the results were 33.62% of Roman Catholics, 22.73% of Evangelical Christians (of several subgroups), 7.95% of Spiritists, 7% of Afro-Brazilian religions (like Umbanda, Quimbanda and Candomblé), 0.01% of Indigenous religions, 4.52% of other religions, 23.78% of irreligious, 0.32% unknown and 0.06% not declared.

== Economy ==
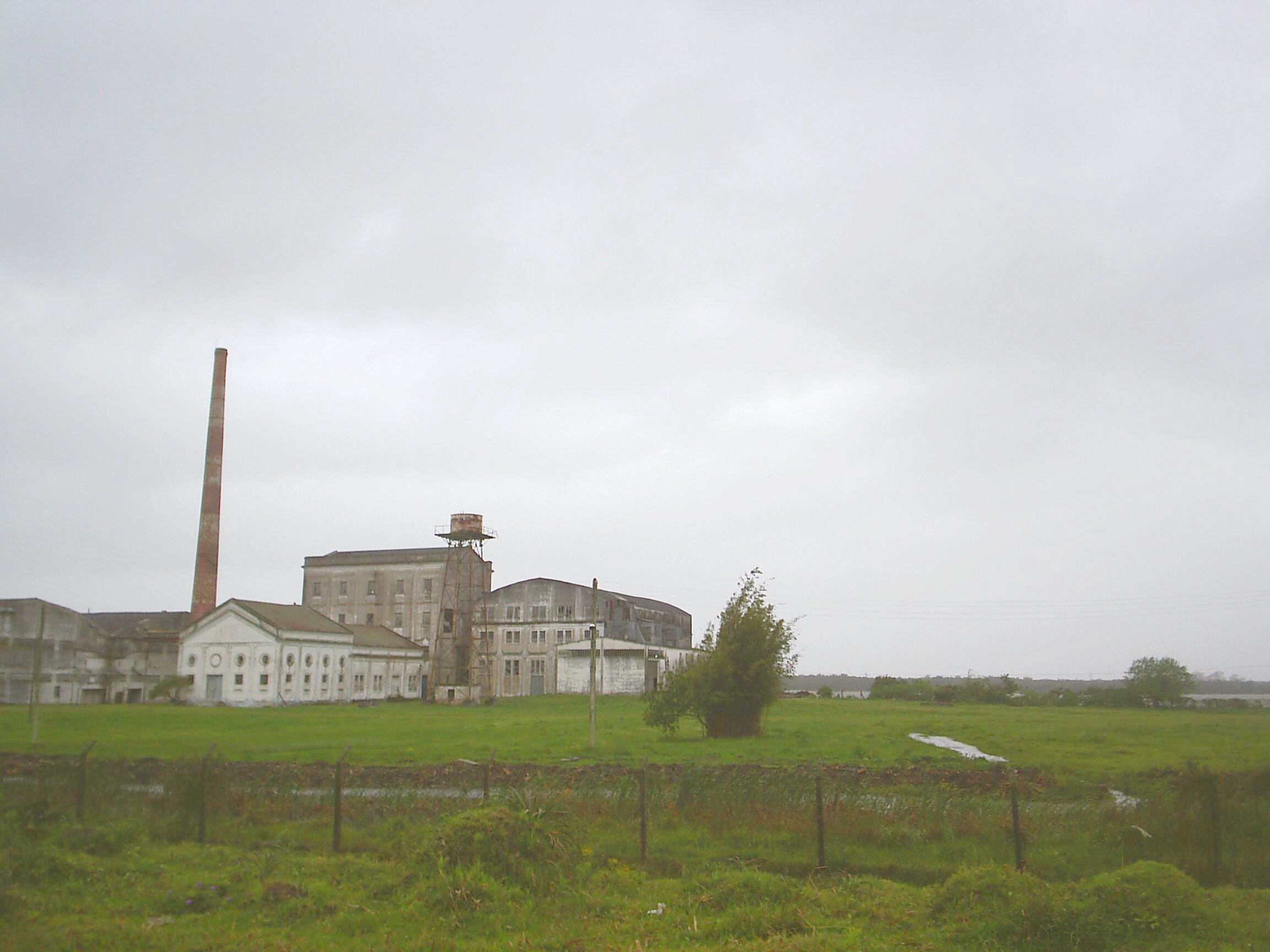
A derelict rice factory located near the São Gonçalo Channel

The economy of Pelotas is mostly agricultural and commercial. The latter is largely represented by Arabs, mostly Lebanese (erroneously referred to as turcos, or Turks), and a few other foreigners.

The region is the largest producer of peaches for the country's storehouse industry, along with other products such as asparagus, cucumber, fig and strawberries. The city also is a great producer of rice and cattle products. Pelotas produces more milk than anywhere else in the state.

Pelotas has industries tied to agriculture, textile, leather tanning and bread-making. Reforestation for the production of paper and cellulose has been a rising economic activity in the whole region.

The city is a large commercial center in the region, attracting shoppers to its sidewalk and neighborhood galleries and shops.

The rural area, also called the "colony", due to the fact that German immigrants built isolated farming communities there, is characterized by the production of fruit, rice, and livestock.

In times past the production of charque, or dried beef, was economically important. The work was usually done by slaves. The charqueadas, as the livestock ranches were called, are still popular tourist attractions, the most famous being the Charqueada Santa Rita and the Charqueada São João.

== Transportation ==
Pelotas International Airport, which was originally built in 1930, serves 130,000 passengers annually with two runways. It is located in the neighborhood of Três Vendas.

The city also has a bus system, a port on the shores of the São Gonçalo Channel, and the junction of two major highways (BR-116 and BR-392) nearby.

== Architecture ==
The city was strongly influence by Portuguese aesthetics, visible in its large houses with Portuguese ceramics on the façade. Pelotas is very rich in architectural treasures and monuments.

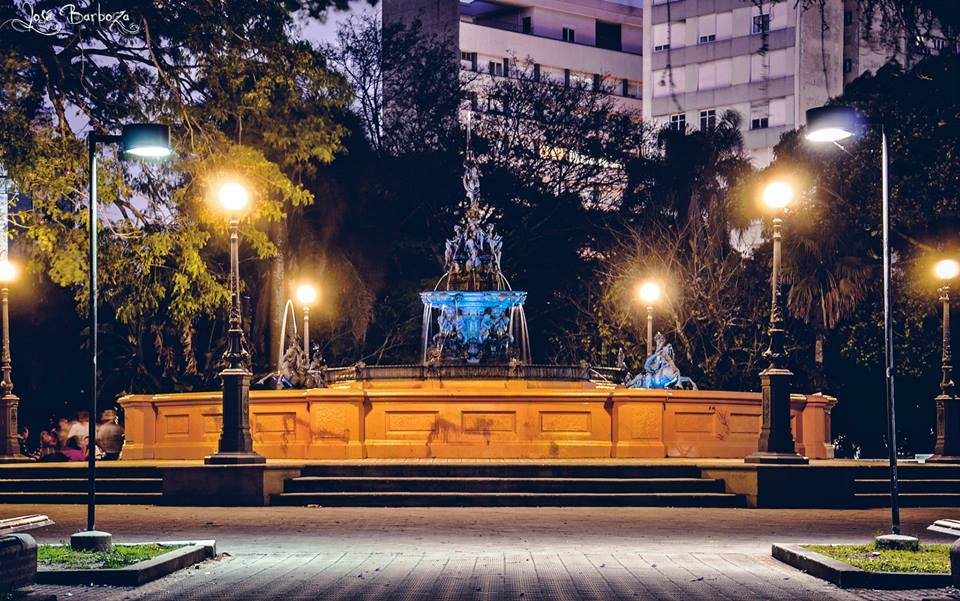
Nereidas Fountain

One example of the many monuments in the city is a fountain called, As Três Meninas, which came from France in 1873, and was placed in the center of the city.

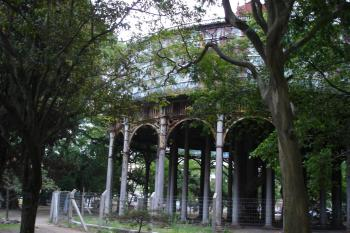
The iron "Caixa D'água"

The largest monument in Pelotas is the iron Caixa d'água, which is located in the Piratinino de Almeida Square, and is the only one of its kind in all of Latin America. It was constructed in 1875, and still holds the daily surplus of water in the city. It sits atop 45 columns, and all of its pieces are made of iron. It has forms that are reminiscent of Asian architecture, though all of the materials used in construction were imported from France.

The architecture of the city is distinguished by its churches, the Grand Hotel and the Public Market.

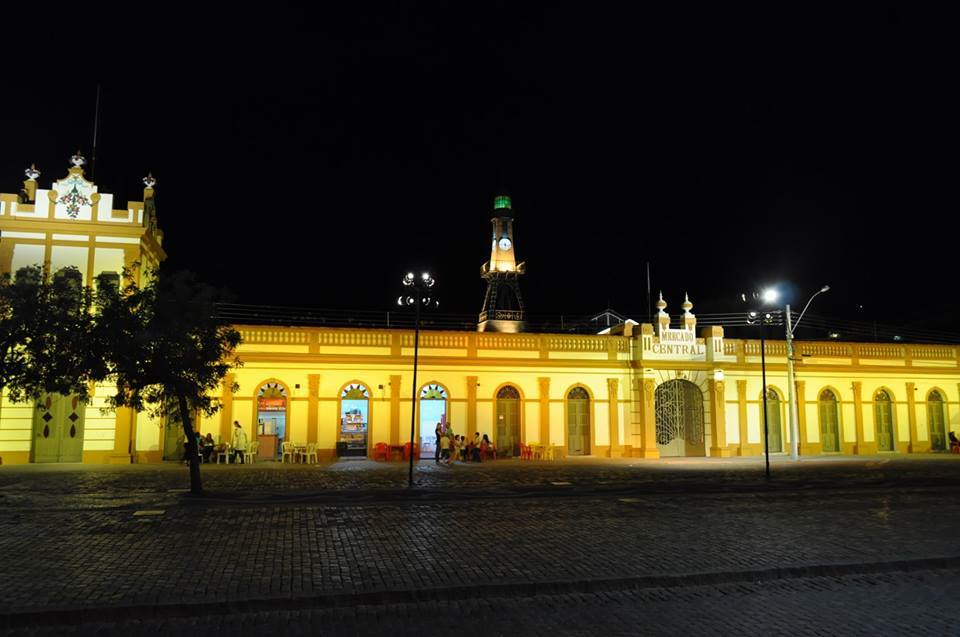
Public Market

The construction of the Public Market was initiated in 1847 and finished in 1853, although between 1911 and 1914 there was a renovation. Its design was fashioned after the Neoclassical style, and was affected by Art Nouveau after 1970 when the building was destroyed by a fire and rebuilt. On it there is a clock tower and an iron lighthouse, imported from Hamburg, Germany, an allusion to the Eiffel Tower.

The Great Hotel was inaugurated in 1928. The building has four floors, presented in the Art Nouveau style. Today the building is closed and belongs to the city government.

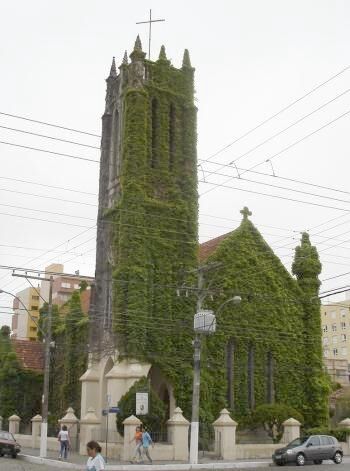
Church of the Redeemer

The Church of the Redeemer, also known as the "Shaggy Church", is the headquarters of the Brazilian Episcopalian Church of the Anglican Communion, and became known for its characteristic vegetal covering. It opened its doors in 1892. Its tower is 27 meters tall, and its stained-glass windows are from New York City.

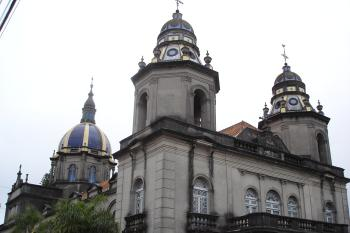
São Francisco de Paula Cathedral

The São Francisco de Paula Metropolitan Cathedral is considered the city's and the region most important religious edifice, due to its size, beauty and the works of art found within its interior. Its construction began in 1813. The cathedral shelters the image of Saint Francis of Paola, by an unknown artist, which was brought from Colônia do Sacramento.

The painter Aldo Locatelli, came from Italy especially to make the frescoes on the ceiling and walls of the cathedral, at the invitation of Dom Antônio Záttera, bishop of Pelotas at the time. Although Locatelli would choose to stay in Rio Grande do Sul and make many other important works in Brazil, including paintings and murals, this is considered his greatest work, together with the passion at the Church of São Pelegrino in Caxias do Sul.

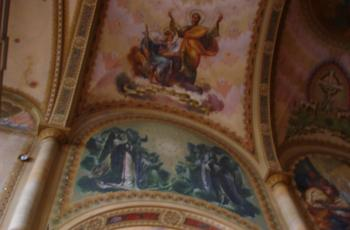
Detail of a fresco by Aldo Locatelli on the ceiling of the cathedral

Also deserving attention is the Museum of the Baroness, which was constructed in the 19th century, occupying an area of approximately 7 hectares, possessing 22 parts and an interior patio. Lining it all were many cultivated and varied gardens.

In Pelotas there are still nine sculptures of Antônio Caringi, considered the best gaúcho sculptor. Among them are: Oferenda, 1942, in bronze, located in the Ecumenical Cemetery São Francisco de Paula; Monumento ao Colono, 1958, in bronze and granite, in the Primeiro de Maio Square; Monumento ao Bispo Dom Joaquim Ferreira de Mello, 1942, in bronze and granite, on the Avenue Dom Joaquim; Sentinela Farroupilha, 1935, in bronze, 20 de Setembro Square; As Três Idades do Trabalho, in granite, Coronel Pedro Osório Square; Dr. Luiz Pereira Lima, 1958, in bronze, Piratinino de Almeida Square; Monumento ao Coronel Pedro Osório, 1954, in bronze and granite, Coronel Pedro Osório Square; Monumento à Mãe, 1968, in bronze and granite, Coronel Pedro Osório Square; Monumento ao Dr. José Brusque 1968, in bronze and granite, Coronel Pedro Osório Square.

== Notable people ==
- João Simões Lopes Neto (1865–1916), writer
- Hipólito da Costa, the founder of the printing press in Brazil
- Zola Amaro (1891–1944), lyrical singer
- Kleiton & Kledir, singers and composers
- Vitor Ramil, singer and composer
- Glória Menezes, actress
- Taison, football player
- Emerson Ferreira da Rosa, football player
- Daniel Carvalho, football player
- Michel Bastos, football player
- Angélica Freitas (* 1973), writer, journalist

== Twin towns – sister cities ==
Pelotas is twinned with:

- Aracati, Brazil (2005)
- Aveiro, Portugal (1996)
- Colonia del Sacramento, Uruguay (2005)
- Suzu, Japan (1963)

== Subdivisions ==
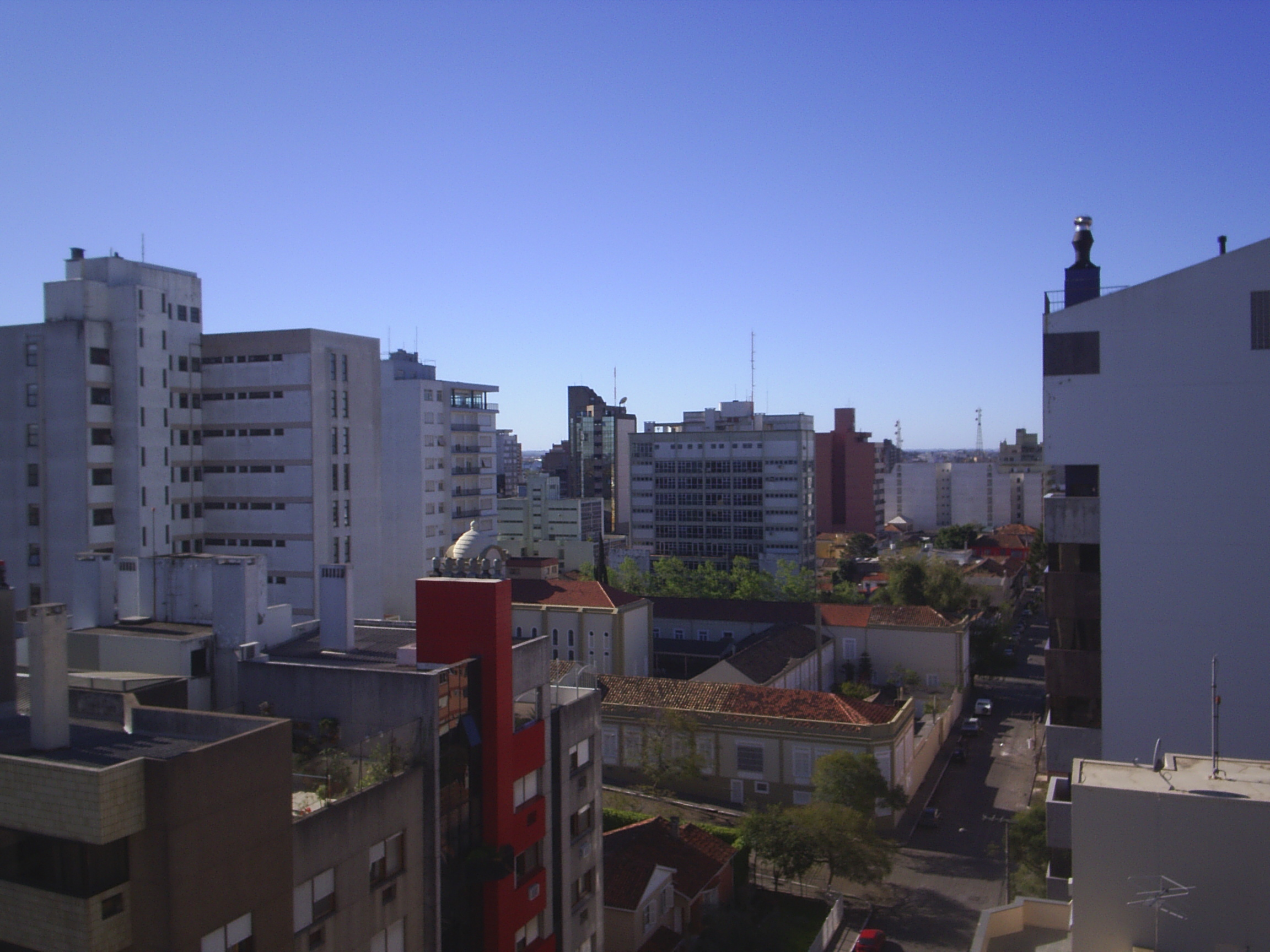
Centro (downtown)

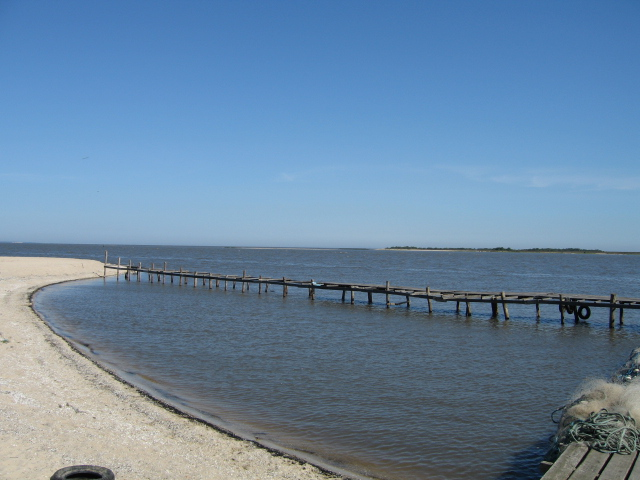
Pontal da Barra at the Colônia Z-3

There are five neighborhoods (bairros) in Pelotas and nine districts:

=== Bairros ===
- Areal
- Centro
- Fragata
- Laranjal
- Três Vendas

=== Districts ===
- 1st District- Sede
- 2nd District- Colônia Z3
- 3rd District- Cerrito Alegre
- 4th District- Triunfo
- 5th District- Cascata
- 6th District- Santa Silvana
- 7th District- Quilombo
- 8th District- Rincão da Cruz
- 9th District- Monte Bonito

== See also ==
- List of municipalities in Rio Grande do Sul
