= Isabel Osorio =

Spaniard courtier

- Born: circa 1522
- Died: October 1589 (aged 67); Palace of Saldañuela, Burgos, Castile and León
- Burial place: Convento de las Trinitarias, Sarracín
- Partner: Philip II of Spain

Isabel Osorio (circa 1522 – October 1589) was a Spaniard courtier and the long-term mistress of Philip II, King of Spain.

== Life ==
=== Ancestry and early life ===
Isabel Osorio was born around 1522 as the daughter of Pedro de Cartagena y Leiva, Lord of Olmillos, regidor of Burgos in Castile and León and his wife, María de Rojas, daughter of Diego Osorio and Isabel de Rojas, herself a daughter of Sancho de Rojas, Lord of Monzón and María de Pereira. Isabel's father was a descendant of Selomóh Ha-Leví, rabbi of the Jewish quarter of Burgos who later converted to Christianity and became the bishop of the same diocese. She had one sister, María de Rojas, wife of Pedro de Velasco, whose son, Pedro Osorio de Velasco inherited Isabel's estate after her death. Isabel was orphaned at a very young age and raised by her maternal uncle, Luis Osorio, whose name she later adopted.

The three employers of Isabel Osorio

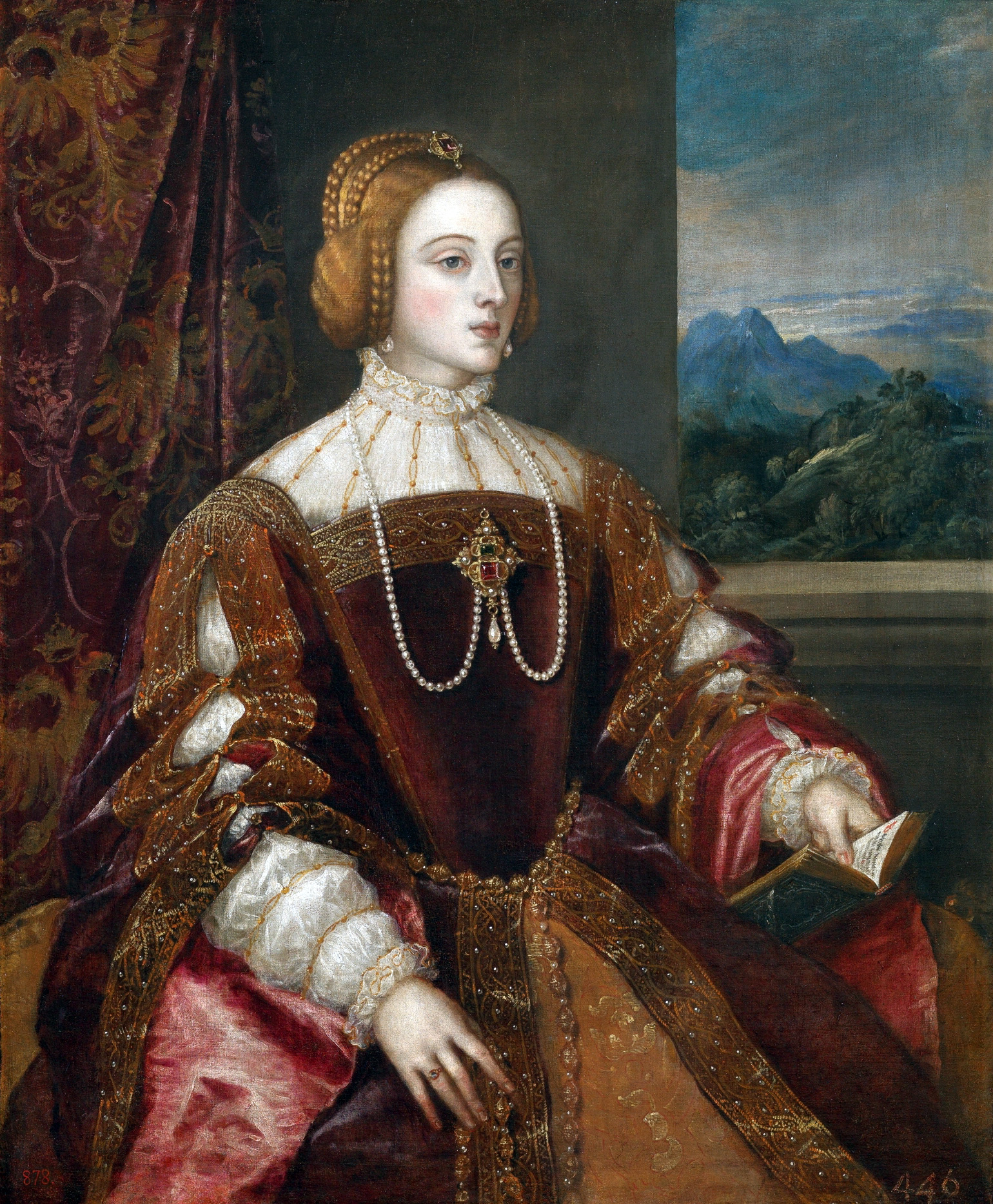
Isabella of Portugal

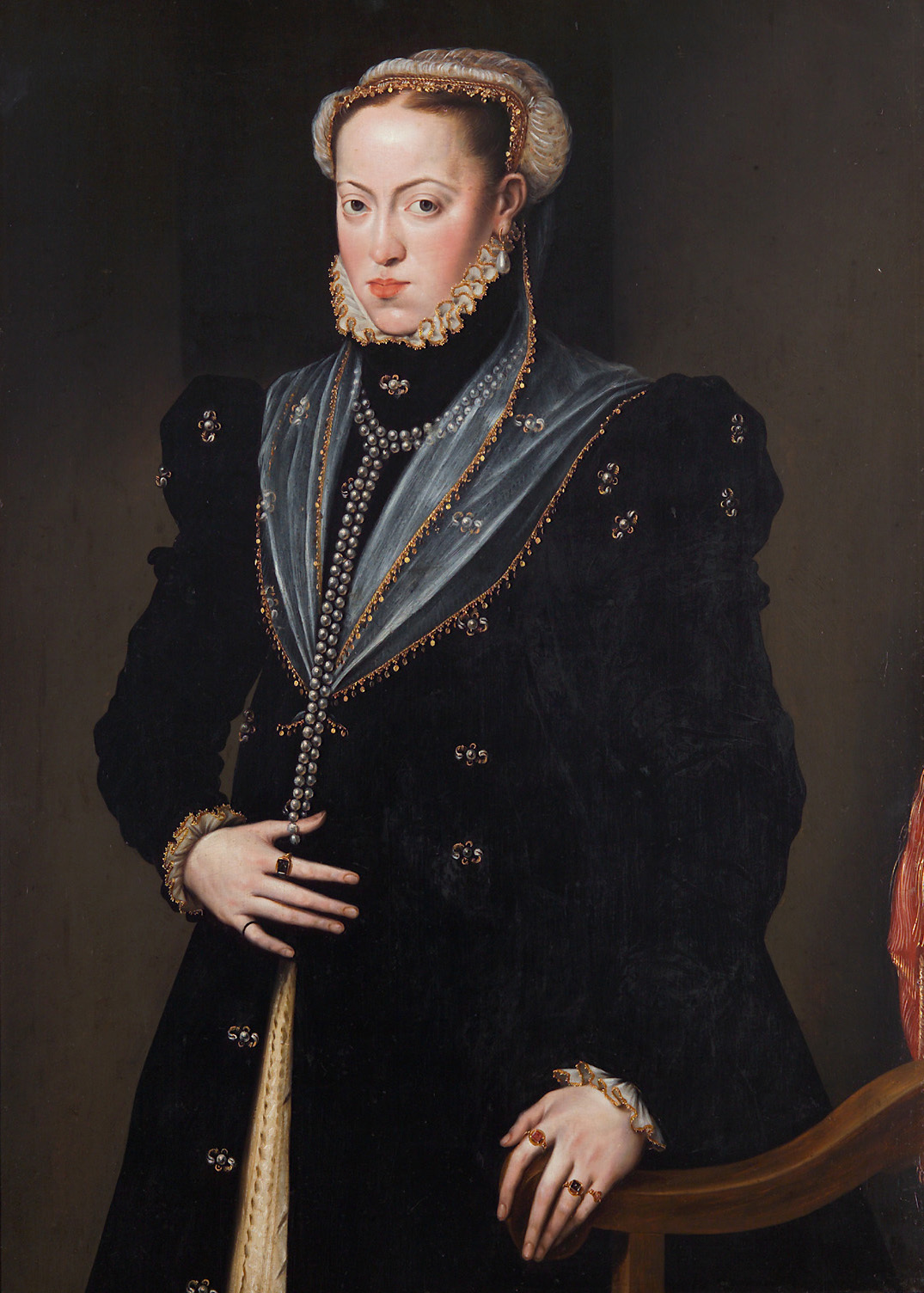
Maria of Austria

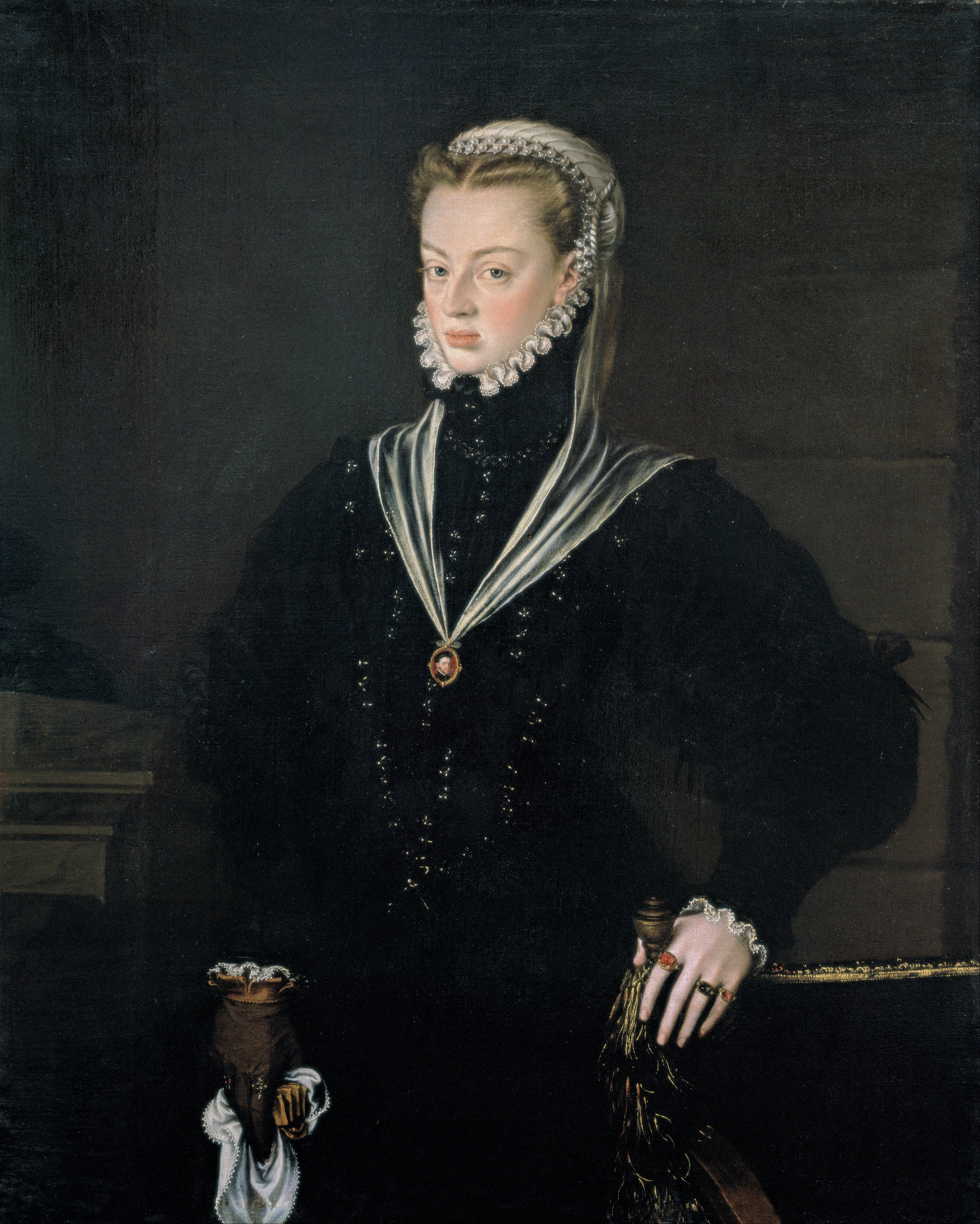
Joanna of Austria

=== As a courtier ===
Osorio became the lady-in-waiting of the Holy Roman Empress, born Infanta Isabella of Portugal (1503–1539). After her death in 1539, she went on to serve her daughters, Archduchesses Maria (1528–1603) and Joanna (1535-1573) of Austria (they were also Infantas of Castile and Aragon, among other titles).

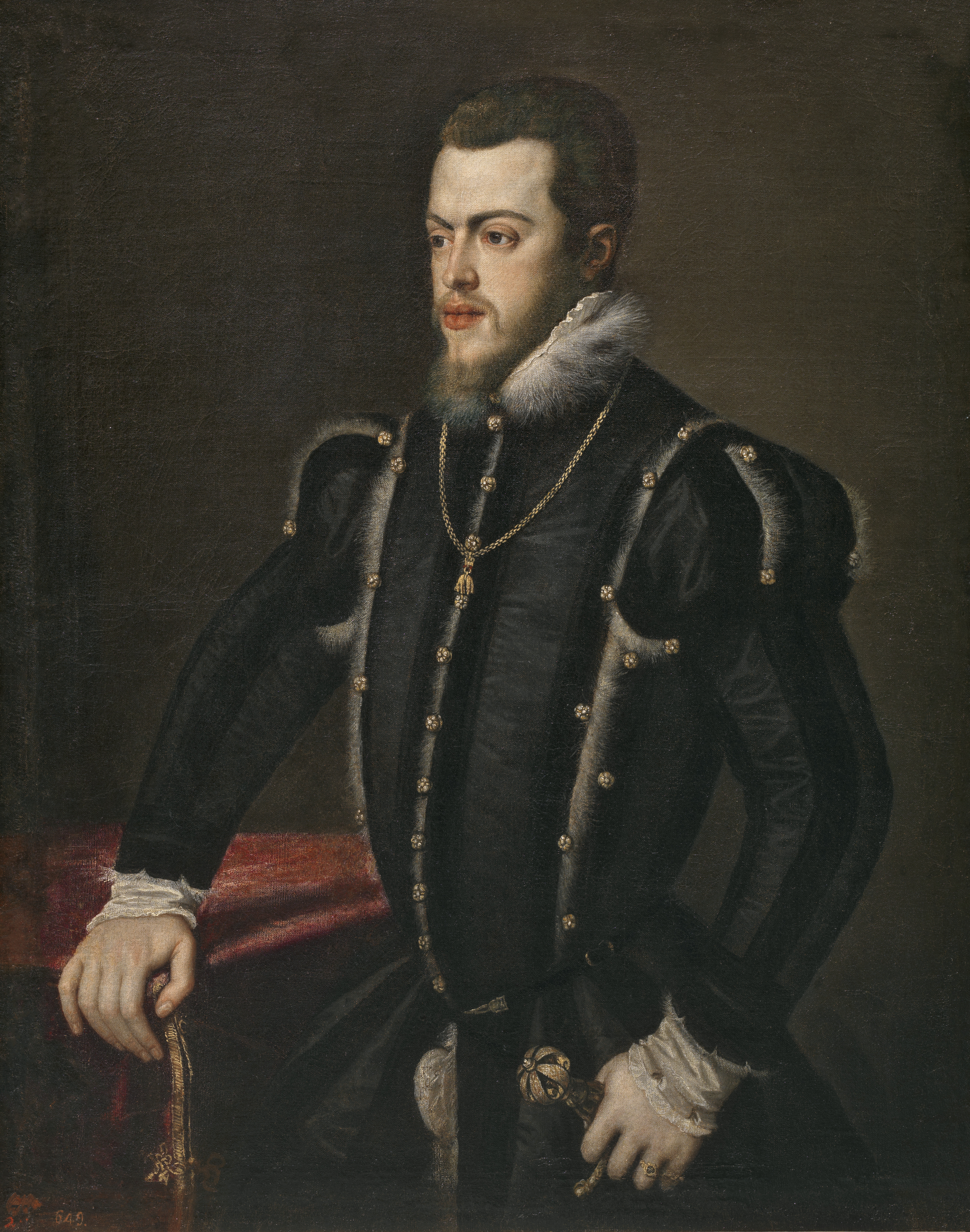
Philip, Prince of Asturias around 1550 on a portrait by Titian

==== Mistress of Philip II ====
She supposedly became the mistress of Philip, Prince of Asturias (1527–1598) when he was a teenager. They likely had two illegitimate children together. William, Prince of Orange (1533–1584; "William the Silent/Taciturn") states in his 1581 Apology that when Philip married Infanta Maria Manuela of Portugal (1527–1545) in 1543, he had already been married to Isabel Osorio, thus accusing him of bigamy. He names their children as Pedro and Bernardino. As William was the leader of Dutch Revolt (1566–1648) against Philip, his account should be treated with caution.

Osorio and the prince reportedly had an idyllic relationship for several years. Philip gave her a substantial income, which enabled her to buy numerous estates, and might have given her a secret document declaring her his wife. The relationship seems to have ended around 1559, when Philip was already King of Spain and married his third wife, Princess Elisabeth of France.

=== Later life ===
Osorio retired to the Palace of Saldañuela near Burgos which she had built after acquiring the tower that stood there with a sum of 2 million maravedís she received from the king. She lived in this palace until her death, and never married. She founded "el convento de las Trinitarias de Sarracín", the Convent of the Trinity in Sarracín, where she was buried after her death in October 1589. Her nephew Pedro Osorio de Velasco, son of her only sister María de Rojas inherited her estate.

Lady Isabel de Osorio, who pretended to be the wife of King Philip II, died and left Pedro de Osorio, her nephew, eight thousand ducats of income and sixty thousand in furniture and money.

— Luis Cabrera de Córdoba, The History of Philip II
