= Osorno =

Osorno may refer to:

== Places and administrative divisions ==
- Osorno, Chile, a city in Chile
- Osorno Province, a province of Chile
- Osorno (volcano), a 2,661-meters (8700-feet) tall conical volcano, located in Chile
- Osorno la Mayor, a municipio in Palencia Province, Castile and León, Spain

== Nobility ==
- Count of Osorno, a Spanish title
- Marquis of Osorno, title granted to Ambrosio O'Higgins, 1st Marquis of Osorno

== People ==
- José Francisco Osorno (1769–1824), Mexican revolutionary active in Zacatlán
- Daniel Osorno (born 1979), retired Mexican football player
- Guillermo Osorno, Nicaraguan pastor and radio evangelist, founder of the Nicaraguan Party of the Christian Path
- Nicolás Osorno, President of Nicaragua from 1 to 5 August 1889

== Other ==
- Osorno Airport, a public use airport near Osorno, Chile
- Osorno Pilauco Airport, a public use airport near Osorno, Chile
- Osorno Básquetbol, a basketball team in the Liga Nacional de Básquetbol de Chile
- Provincial Osorno, a football club based in Osorno, Chile
- SS Osorno, a German cargo ship, launched in 1938, beached on 25 December 1943, and permanently destroyed on 26 August 1944
