= List of mayors of Pelotas =

This is the list of mayors of Pelotas, Rio Grande do Sul, Brazil.

List of Pelotas mayors
Nº	Name	Party	Election	Start	End	Ref
1	Gervásio Alves Pereira	PRR	(Note: During the first republic, the mayor was appointed by Municipal Chamber.)	September 16, 1891	1893	
2	Antero Vitoriano Leivas	PRR	(Note: During the first republic, the mayor was appointed by Municipal Chamber.)	1893	September 1900	
3	Francisco Moreira	PRR	(Note: During the first republic, the mayor was appointed by Municipal Chamber.)	September 1900	August 1902	
4	José Barbosa Gonçalves	PRR	(Note: During the first republic, the mayor was appointed by Municipal Chamber.)	August 1902	1904	
5	Cipriano Correia Barcelos	PRR	(Note: During the first republic, the mayor was appointed by Municipal Chamber.)	1904	September 1908	
6	José Barbosa Gonçalves	PRR	(Note: During the first republic, the mayor was appointed by Municipal Chamber.)	September 1908	February 9, 1912	
7	Cipriano Correia Barcelos	PRR	(Note: During the first republic, the mayor was appointed by Municipal Chamber.)	February 9, 1912	1920	
8	Pedro Luís Osório	PRR	(Note: During the first republic, the mayor was appointed by Municipal Chamber.)	1920	1924	
9	Augusto Simões Lopes	PRR	(Note: During the first republic, the mayor was appointed by Municipal Chamber.)	1924	1928	
10	João Py Crespo	PRR	(Note: During the first republic, the mayor was appointed by Municipal Chamber.)	1928	1932	
11	Augusto Simões Lopes	PRL	(Note: During the provisional government until the promulgation of 1934 constitution, the mayors were indicated by the state governor.)	1932	1933	
12	Joaquim Assunção Júnior	PRL	(Note: During the provisional government until the promulgation of 1934 constitution, the mayors were indicated by the state governor.)	1933	1934	
13	Sílvio Barbedo	PRL	(Note: During the provisional government until the promulgation of 1934 constitution, the mayors were indicated by the state governor.)	1934	1936	
13	Sílvio Barbedo	PRL	1935	1936	1938	
14	José Júlio Barros	(Note: During New State, political parties were prohibited.)	(Note: In New State until the promulgation of 1946 Constitution, mayors were indicated by the state governor.)	1938	1944	
15	Sílvio Echenique	(Note: During New State, political parties were prohibited.)	(Note: In New State until the promulgation of 1946 Constitution, mayors were indicated by the state governor.)	1944	1945	
16	Sérgio Abreu da Silveira	(Note: During New State, political parties were prohibited.)	(Note: In New State until the promulgation of 1946 Constitution, mayors were indicated by the state governor.)	1945	1946	
17	Procópio Freitas	PSD	(Note: In New State until the promulgation of 1946 Constitution, mayors were indicated by the state governor.)	1946	1948	
18	Joaquim Duval	PSD	1947	1948	1952	
19	Mário Meneghetti	PTB	1951	1952	1960	
20	Adolfo Antônio Fetter	PSD	1955	1956	1960	
21	João Carlos Gastal	PTB	1959	1960	1964	
22	Edmar Fetter	PSD (Note: In 1965 the PSD was estinguished and Edmar entered into ARENA.)	1963	1964	1969	
22	Edmar Fetter	ARENA	1963	1964	1969	
23	Francisco Fonseca	ARENA	1968	1969	1973	
24	Ary Alcantara	ARENA	1972	1973	1977	
25	Irajá Rodrigues	MDB	1976	1977	1982	
26	Pedro Machado Filho (Note: The president of Municipal Chamber sworn 'cause mayor elected resigned to run for federal deputy in the 1982 general election.)	PMDB	1976	1982	1983	
27	Bernardo de Souza	PMDB	1982	1983	1987	
28	José Maria Carvalho (Note: The vice-mayor sworn 'cause mayor elected took office in the state administration.)	PMDB	1982	1987	January 1, 1989	
29	Anselmo Rodrigues	PDT	1988	January 1, 1989	January 1, 1993	
30	Irajá Rodrigues	PMDB	1992	January 1, 1993	January 1, 1997	
31	Anselmo Rodrigues	PDT	1996	January 1, 1997	November 21, 1998	
32	Otelmo Demari Alves (Note: The vice-mayor sworn 'cause mayor was sued by the Electoral Justice.)	PDT	1996	November 21, 1998	January 1, 2001	
33	Fernando Marroni	PT	2000	January 1, 2001	January 1, 2005	
34	Bernardo de Souza	PPS	2004	January 1, 2005	June 2006	
35	Fetter Jr (Note: The vice-mayor sworn 'cause mayor elected resigned due health problems.)	PP	2004	June 2006	January 1, 2009	
35	Fetter Jr	PP	2008	January 1, 2009	January 1, 2013	
36	Eduardo Leite	PSDB	2012	January 1, 2013	January 1, 2017	
37	Paula Mascarenhas	PSDB	2016	January 1, 2017	January 1, 2021	
37	Paula Mascarenhas	PSDB	2020	January 1, 2021	January 1, 2025	
38	Fernando Marroni	PT	2024	January 1, 2025	Incumbent	
