= Miguel Ángel Osorio =

Miguel Ángel Osorio may refer to:

- Miguel Ángel Osorio Benítez, Colombian poet and writer better known by his pseudonym, Porfirio Barba-Jacob
- Miguel Ángel Osorio Chong, Mexican politician who has served as Governor of Hidalgo
