= Carolina Osorio =

Colombian engineer

- Born: Colombia
- Education: Ensimag; University College London; École Polytechnique Fédérale de Lausanne
- Known for: Operations research applied to urban transportation
- Scientific career
- Fields: Transportation science
- Workplaces: Massachusetts Institute of Technology; HEC Montréal
- Doctoral advisor: Michel Bierlaire
- Website: https://carolinaosorio.net/

Carolina Osorio is a full professor in Decision Sciences at HEC Montreal. Her work is focused on operations research applied to urban transportation.

== Early life and education ==
Osorio was born in Colombia. She studied in France and in the United Kingdom before earning a PhD in 2010 from École Polytechnique Fédérale de Lausanne in Switzerland under the supervision of Michel Bierlaire.

== Professional accomplishments ==
Osorio was included in the MIT Technology Review's prestigious Innovators Under 35 list in 2015. She has created an algorithmic system that analyzes transit systems and is capable of proposing improvements to optimize traffic through evaluations and forecasts.

The algorithms recreate traffic simulations using data captured by a network of urban sensors and cameras. This analysis is able to reduce traffic jams as well as CO_{2} emissions, and can also inform drivers of how their movements affect traffic, how much energy they consume, and the amount of emissions they produce. Her work leverages multimodal data sources including individual travelers and vehicles to analyze and optimize the performance of transportation systems at the scale of entire metropolitan areas.

== Awards ==
According to Cornell Engineering,

She was recognized as one of the outstanding early-career engineers in the U.S. by the National Academy of Engineering's EU-US Frontiers of Engineering Symposium, and is the recipient of a US National Science Foundation CAREER Award, an MIT CEE Maseeh Excellence in Teaching Award, an MIT Technology Review EmTech Colombia TR35 Award, an IBM Faculty Award and a European Association of Operational Research Societies (EURO) Doctoral Dissertation Award.

== Selected publications ==
- Osorio, C., & Chong, L. (2015). A computationally efficient simulation-based optimization algorithm for large-scale urban transportation problems. Transportation Science, 49(3), 623-636.
- Osorio, C., & Nanduri, K. (2015). Energy-efficient urban traffic management: a microscopic simulation-based approach. Transportation Science, 49(3), 637-651.
- Osorio, C., & Nanduri, K. (2015). Urban transportation emissions mitigation: Coupling high-resolution vehicular emissions and traffic models for traffic signal optimization. Transportation Research Part B: Methodological, 81, 520-538.
- Osorio, C., & Selvam, K. K. (2017). Simulation-based optimization: achieving computational efficiency through the use of multiple simulators. Transportation Science, 51(2), 395-411.
- Osorio, C., & Yamani, J. (2017). Analytical and scalable analysis of transient tandem Markovian finite capacity queueing networks. Transportation Science, 51(3), 823-840.
