= Catholic University of Pelotas =

Private university in Pelotas, Brazil

- Universidade Católica de Pelotas
- Coat of arms of the university
- Other names: UCPel
- Motto: In Vinculo Veritatis
- Motto in English: In The Bond of Truth
- Type: Private, non-profit
- Established: November 12, 1960
- Affiliations: Roman Catholic Church
- Chancellor: Dom Antônio Zattera
- Rector: Alencar Mello Proença
- Vice rector: José Carlos Pereira Bachettini Júnior
- Location: Pelotas, Rio Grande do Sul, Brazil; 31.7745°S 52.3410°W
- Campus: Urban
- Website: www.ucpel.com.br

The Catholic University of Pelotas (Portuguese: Universidade Católica de Pelotas, UCPel) is a private and non-profit Catholic university, located in Pelotas, one of the more southern cities of Brazil. It is one of the largest and most prestigious universities in Rio Grande do Sul. It is maintained by the Catholic Archdiocese of Pelotas.

It also has campuses in five other municipalities: Arroio Grande, Canguçu, Pinheiro Machado, Piratini and Santa Vitória do Palmar.
