= Las Quemas Airport =

- IATA: none; ICAO: SCQM

Summary
- Airport type: Public
- Serves: Osorno, Chile
- Elevation AMSL: 250 ft / 76 m
- Coordinates: 40°38′16″S 73°07′40″W

Map
- Location of Las Quemas Airport in Chile

Runways
| Direction | Length | | Surface |
| Direction | m | ft | Surface |
|---|---|---|---|
| 14/32 | 750 | 2,461 | Grass |
- Source: Landings.com Google Maps GCM

Las Quemas Airport (Spanish: Aeropuerto de Las Quemas), (ICAO: SCQM) is an airport 6 kilometres (3.7 mi) south of Osorno, a city in the Los Lagos Region of Chile.

The Osorno VOR-DME (Ident: OSO) is located 3.5 nautical miles (6.5 km) east-northeast of the airport. The Osorno non-directional beacon (Ident: OSO) is located 3.6 nautical miles (6.7 km) east-northeast of the airport.

There are unmarked power lines along the highway just short of the Runway 14 threshold.

== See also ==
- Transport in Chile
- List of airports in Chile
