= Felipe Barrera-Osorio =

Colombian economist

Academic background
- Education: Universidad de los Andes (Colombia)

Academic work
- Discipline: Economics
- Institutions: Vanderbilt University
- Awards: Juan Luis Londono Medal

Felipe Barrera-Osorio is a Colombian economist and associate professor of Public Policy, Education and Economics at Peabody College of Education and Human Development at Vanderbilt University. Barrera-Osorio's work on the economics of education earned him the Juan Luis Londono Medal, Colombia's equivalent to the John Bates Clark Medal, in 2008.

== Biography ==
Felipe Barrera-Osorio earned a B.A. and master's degree in economics from the Universidad de los Andes (Colombia) in 1992, followed by a Ph.D. in economics from the University of Maryland, College Park in 2003. During his graduate studies, Barrera-Osorio specialized on public economics, labour economics and political economy and published a thesis on the relationship between decentralization and education under Jonas Gelbach, Robert Schwab, Wallace Oates, Jennifer Rice and Seth Sanders. After his graduation, Barrera-Osorio became deputy director of the Higher Education and Development Foundation (Fedesarrollo) (2004–06) before accepting a position as Senior Economist in the World Bank's Human Development Network on Education (2006–11). During his work for the World Bank, Barrera-Osorio led impact evaluations of educational programs in, e.g. Kenya, Ghana, Pakistan, Cambodia and Indonesia. In 2011, he left the World Bank to accept a position as assistant professor of education and economics at the Harvard Graduate School of Education, where he was promoted to associate professor in 2015. Besides his academic work, Barrera-Osorio also serves as Head of the Latin American and Caribbean Economic Association's Impact Evaluation Network.

== Research ==
Felipe Barrera-Osorio's current research focuses on the impact of educational incentives on the learning of children in primary and secondary school. In the past, his research has included the role and impact of public-private partnerships in education (with Harry Anthony Patrinos and Juliana Guáqueta), the computerization of education (with Leigh Linden), the design of conditional cash transfer programmes (with Marianne Bertrand, Linden and Francisco Perez-Calle), and the theory and empirics of school-based management (with Patrinos, Tazeen Fasih, and Lucrecia Santibánez).
