= Sarracín =

Coordinates: 42°15′N 3°42′W

- Municipality and town
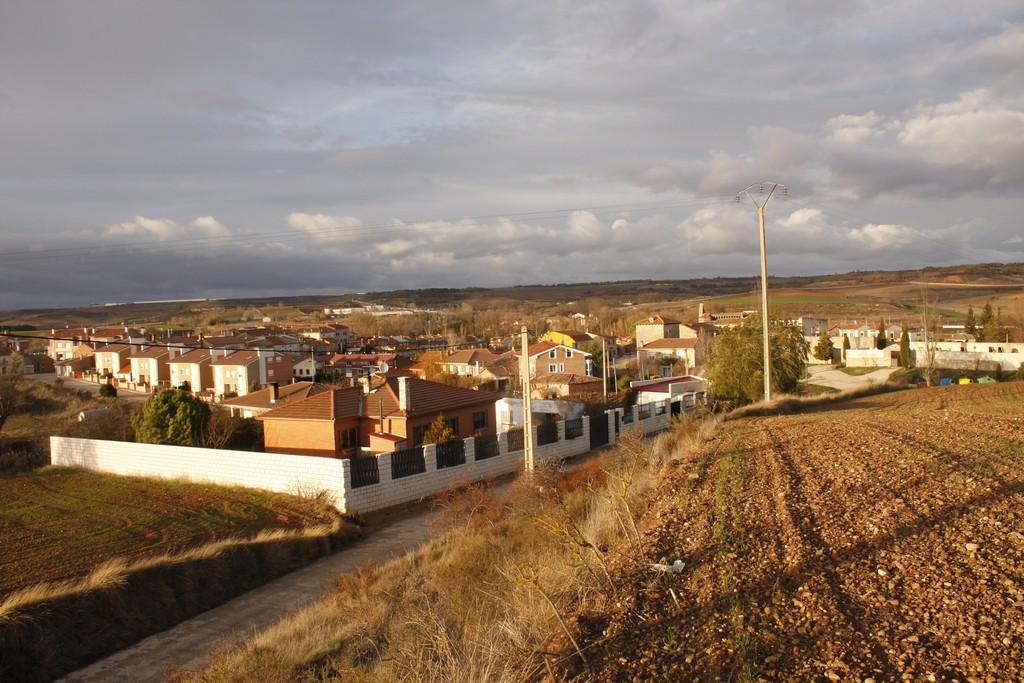
- View of Sarracín, 2009

- Flag Coat of arms
- Interactive map of Sarracín
- Country: Spain
- Autonomous community: Castile and León
- Province: Burgos
- Comarca: Alfoz de Burgos

Area
  - Total: 9 km^{2} (3.5 sq mi)

Population (2025-01-01)
  - Total: 261
  - Density: 29/km^{2} (75/sq mi)
- Time zone: UTC+1 (CET)
  - Summer (DST): UTC+2 (CEST)
- Postal code: 09620
- Website: http://www.sarracin.es/

Sarracín is a municipality and town located in the province of Burgos, Castile and León, Spain. According to the 2004 census (INE), the municipality has a population of 285 inhabitants.
