= Marco Osório =

Portuguese footballer

Personal information
- Full name: Marco Alberto Pereira Osório
- Date of birth: 7 September 1979 (age 47)
- Place of birth: São Sebastião da Pedreira, Portugal
- Height: 1.83 m (6 ft 0 in)
- Position: Midfielder

Youth career
- 1991–1995: Benfica
- 1995–1998: Alverca

Senior career*
Years	Team	Apps	(Gls)
1998–2000	Samora Correia		
2000–2004	Olivais e Moscavide (Note: The statistics for the 2000–01 season are unavailable.)	83	(1)
2004–2005	Espinho	15	(1)
2005	Pandurii Târgu Jiu	3	(0)
2006	Operário	11	(0)
2006–2007	Imortal	7	(0)
2007–2008	Eléctrico	45	(3)
2009	Madalena	6	(0)
2010	Vitória Pico	13	(2)
2010–2011	Praiense	11	(0)
2011–2012	Santo António Lisbon		
2012–2013	Futebol Benfica	7	(0)
Total		201	(7)
- * Club domestic league appearances and goals

Marco Alberto Pereira Osório (born 7 September 1979), known simply as Marco Osório, is a Portuguese former footballer who played as a midfielder.
