= Tomás Luís Osório =

Colonel Tomás Luís Osório (died 1763) was a Portuguese military figure. He is best known for leading troops against Pedro de Cevallos in the southern Brazil/Uruguay region in the 1760s. On October 6, 1762, he began to rebuild the Fortaleza de Santa Teresa . On April 19, 1763, Pedro de Cevallos captured the fortress, taking Osório prisoner along with 25 officers. After the war, Osório was submitted to a council of war in Portugal and accused of having favored the Spanish conquest, and was subsequently hanged in Lisbon. His widow then presented evidence that showed the error of the indictment.
