= Uruguay =

Country in South America

Oriental Republic of Uruguay República Oriental del Uruguay (Spanish)
- Flag (Note: Uruguay has three official flags. They are the National Pavilion, which has a higher status and is the flag shown here, the Artigas flag, and the flag of the Treinta y Tres) Coat of arms
- Motto: Libertad o Muerte "Freedom or Death"
- Anthem: Himno Nacional del Uruguay "National Anthem of Uruguay"
- Sol de Mayo (Sun of May)

- Location of Uruguay (dark green) in South America
- Capital and largest city: Montevideo; 34°53′S 56°10′W
- Official languages: None (de jure): Spanish (Note: Spanish has never been proclaimed the official language of Uruguay by either constitution or any decree. However, it is de facto official in all forms of government and society.); Uruguayan Sign Language (Note: It has de jure official status as of 2001.); (de facto)
- Ethnic groups (2023): 86.0% White (Note: Self-identified ethnic-racial ancestry. Total adds up to more than 100% as people were allowed to choose more than one ancestral group); 10.4% Black; 6.3% Indigenous; 0.7% East Asian; 6.3% other
- Religion (2022): 60.8% Christianity; 38.0% no religion; 1.2% other
- Demonym: Uruguayan
- Government: Unitary presidential republic
  - President: Yamandú Orsi
  - Vice-President: Carolina Cosse
- Legislature: General Assembly
  - Upper house: Senate
  - Lower house: Chamber of Representatives

Independence from Brazil (Note: Initially established in 1813 as the Província Oriental, part of the United Provinces of Rio de la Plata, from 1815 to 1817 it was part of the Federal League, after which it was invaded and later annexed (in 1821) by Brazil, which ruled it as the Cisplatina Province until it declared independence from Brazil and adhesion to the United Provinces, which did not come to fruition.)
  - Declared: 25 August 1825
  - Recognised: 27 August 1828
  - Current constitution: 15 February 1967

Area
  - Total: 176,215 km^{2} (68,037 sq mi) (89th)
  - Water (%): 1.5

Population
  - 2023 census: ▼3,499,451 (132nd)
  - Density: 19.5/km^{2} (50.5/sq mi) (206th)
- GDP (PPP): 2026 estimate
  - Total: ▲$135.773 billion (95th)
  - Per capita: ▲$39,008 (57th)
- GDP (nominal): 2026 estimate
  - Total: ▲$95.155 billion (80th)
  - Per capita: ▲$27,339 (51st)
- Gini (2024): ▼40.0 medium inequality
- HDI (2023): ▲0.862 very high (48th)
- Currency: Uruguayan peso (UYU)
- Time zone: UTC−03:00 (UYT)
- Date format: dd/mm/yyyy
- Calling code: +598
- ISO 3166 code: UY
- Internet TLD: .uy

Uruguay, (Note: /ˈjʊərəɡwaɪ/ YOOR-ə-gwy, Spanish: [uɾuˈɣwaj]; Portuguese: Uruguai) officially the Oriental Republic of Uruguay, (Note: Spanish: República Oriental del Uruguay) is a country in southeastern South America. It shares borders with Argentina to its west and southwest and Brazil to its north and northeast, while bordering the Río de la Plata to the south and the Atlantic Ocean to the southeast. It is part of the Southern Cone region of South America. Uruguay covers an area of approximately 176,215 square kilometers (68,037 sq mi). It has a population of almost 3.5 million people, of whom nearly 2 million live in the metropolitan area of its capital and largest city, Montevideo.

The area that became Uruguay was first inhabited by groups of hunter gatherers 13,000 years ago. The first European explorer to reach the region was Juan Díaz de Solís in 1516, but the area was colonised later than its neighbours. At the time of European arrival, the Charrúa were the predominant tribe, alongside other groups such as the Guaraní and the Chaná. However, none of these peoples were socially or politically organised in large groups, which contributed to their decline. Amid territorial disputes, the Portuguese established Colônia do Sacramento in 1680, and the Spanish founded Montevideo as a military stronghold. Uruguay secured its independence between 1811 and 1828, following a four-way struggle involving Portugal, Spain, and later the United Provinces of the Río de la Plata and the Empire of Brazil. In 1830, the country enacted its constitution and was formally established as an independent state.

Following independence, Uruguay experienced foreign intervention, internal conflicts and political instability. From the second half of the 19th century, successive waves of European migration, particularly from Spain, Italy and France, reshaped the country's demographics and contributed to the development of modern Uruguayan culture. During this period, national politics were dominated by the Colorado Party and the National Party, collectively known as the Traditional Parties, which fought several civil wars. In the early 20th century, a series of economic, labour and social reforms, combined with sustained political stability, established Uruguay as an advanced welfare state and earned it the nickname "Switzerland of the Americas".

Economic crises and escalating political and social tensions amid the Cold War, including the activities of the far-left National Liberation Movement–Tupamaros, an urban guerrilla movement, contributed to the erosion of democratic institutions in the late 1960s and early 1970s. This culminated in the 1973 coup d'état, which ushered in a civic-military dictatorship that lasted until 1985. Since the restoration of democracy, Uruguay has been a constitutional republic, with a president who serves as both head of state and head of government.

Uruguay is highly ranked in international measurements of democracy, government transparency, economic freedom, social progress, income equality, per capita income, innovation, and infrastructure. It is classified as a high-income economy. It is also highly socially liberal, and has fully legalised cannabis—the first country in the world to do so—as well as same-sex marriage, abortion and euthanasia. Uruguay is also a founding member of the United Nations, the OAS, and Mercosur.

== Etymology ==
The country of Uruguay takes its name from the Río Uruguay in the Indigenous Guaraní language. There are several interpretations, including "bird-river" ("the river of the uru", via Charruan, urú being a common noun for any wild fowl). The name could also refer to a river snail called uruguá (Pomella megastoma) that was plentiful across its shores.

One of the most popular interpretations of the name was proposed by the renowned Uruguayan poet Juan Zorrilla de San Martín, "the river of painted birds"; this interpretation, although dubious, still holds an important cultural significance in the country.

In Spanish colonial times and for some time thereafter, Uruguay and some neighbouring territories were called Banda Oriental [del Uruguay] ("Eastern Bank [of the Uruguay River]"), then for a few years the Provincia Oriental ("Eastern Province").

Since its independence, the country has been known as "República Oriental del Uruguay", which literally translates to "Republic East of the Uruguay [River]". However, it is officially translated either as the "Oriental Republic of Uruguay" or the "Eastern Republic of Uruguay".

== History ==
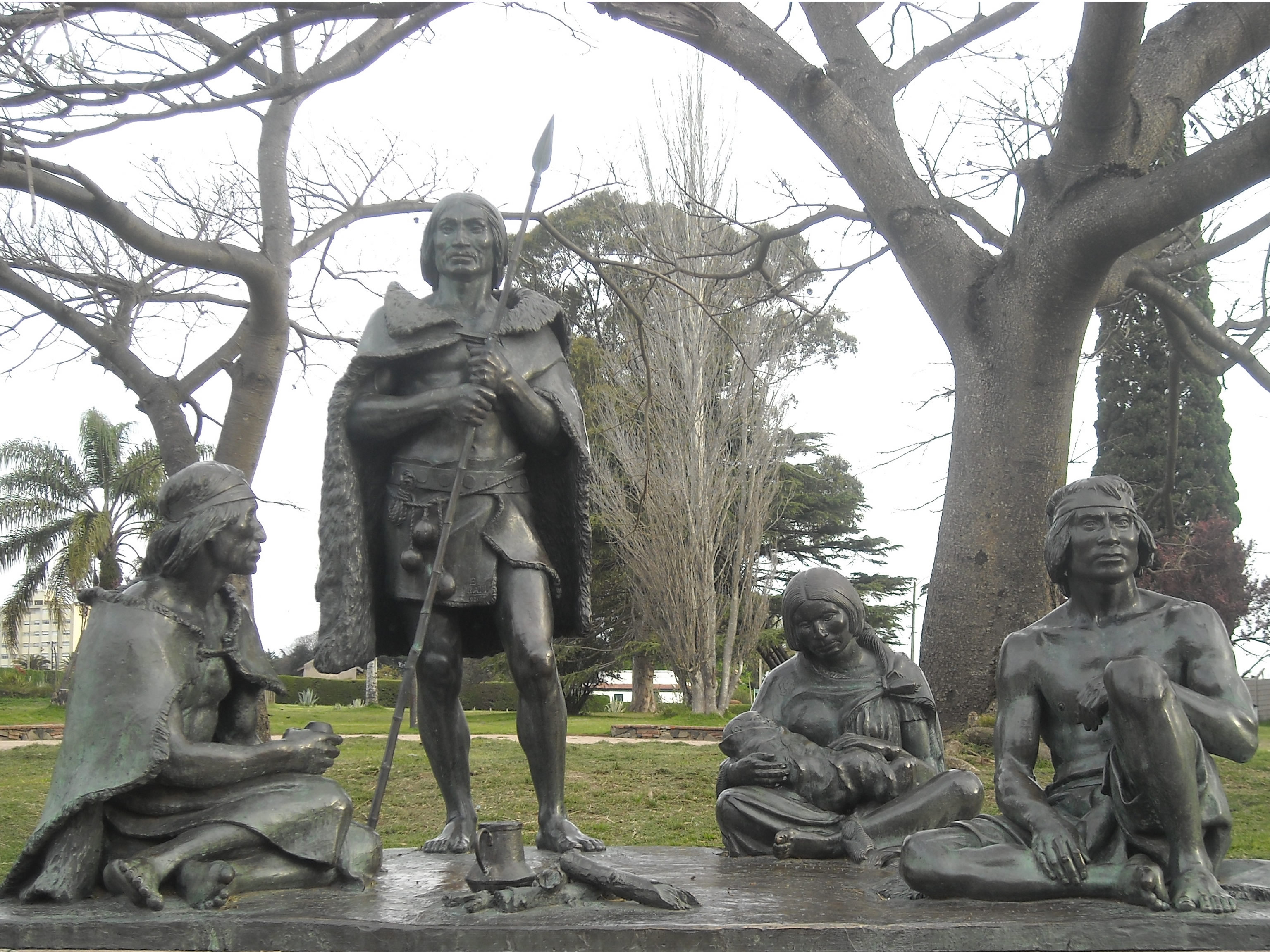
Monument to four Charrúa, the Indigenous people of Uruguay, who survived the Massacre of Salsipuedes

=== Prehistory ===
Human presence in the region now known as Uruguay dates back approximately 13,000 years, with evidence of hunter-gatherer communities. It is estimated that at the time of the first contact with Europeans in the 16th century, there were about 9,000 Charrúa and 6,000 Chaná and some Guaraní island settlements.

There is an extensive archaeological collection of man-made tumuli known as "Cerritos de Indios" in the eastern part of the country, some of them dating back to 5,000 years ago. Very little is known about the people who built them as they left no written record, but evidence has been found in place of indigenous agriculture and of extinct indigenous woolly dogs.

=== Colonial rule ===
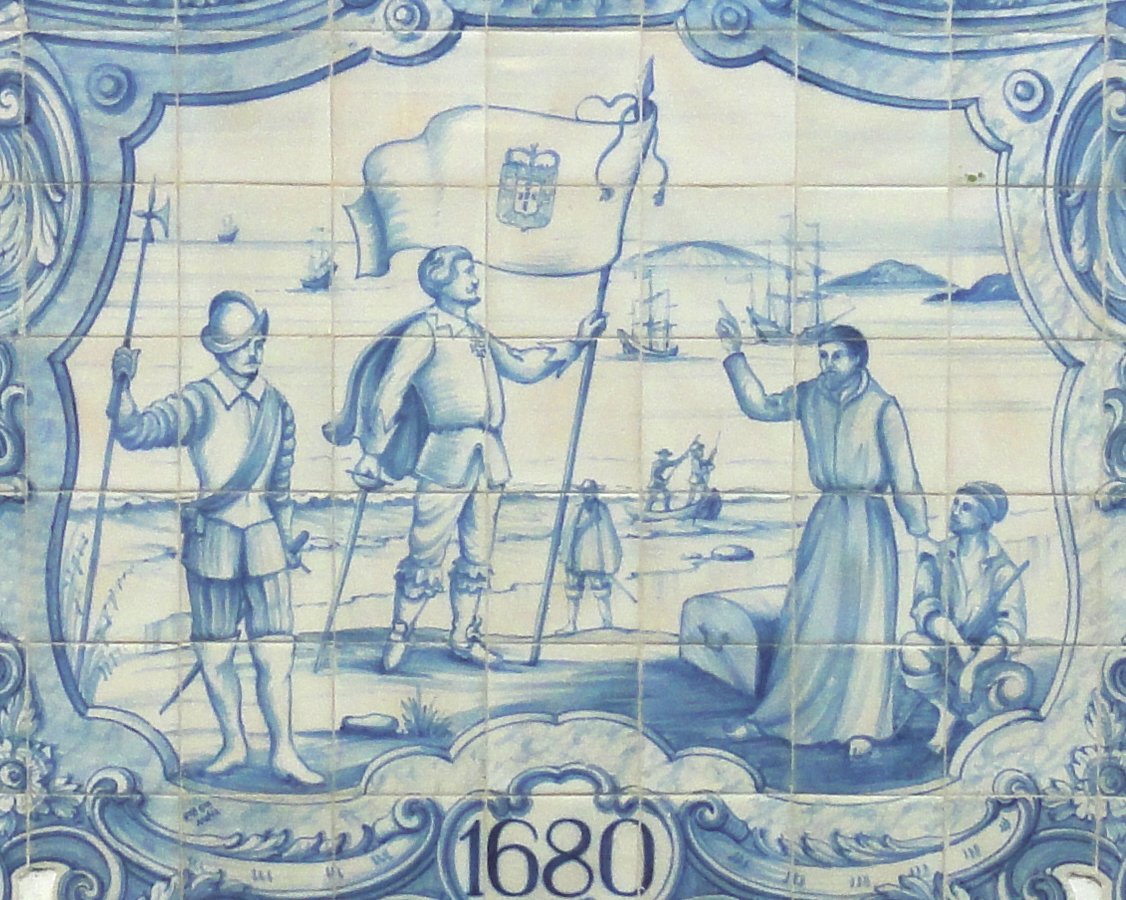
The Portuguese first established Colonia do Sacramento in 1680.

The Portuguese were the first Europeans to enter the region of present-day Uruguay in 1512. The Spanish arrived in present-day Uruguay in 1515 but were the first to set foot in the area, claiming it for the crown. The indigenous peoples' fierce resistance to conquest, combined with the absence of valuable resources, limited European settlement in the region during the 16th and 17th centuries. Uruguay then became a zone of contention between the Spanish and Portuguese empires. In 1603, the Spanish began introducing cattle, which became a source of regional wealth. The first permanent Spanish settlement was founded in 1624 at Soriano on the Río Negro. In 1680, the Portuguese built a fort at Colonia del Sacramento.

Montevideo, the current capital of Uruguay, was founded by the Spanish in 1726 as a military stronghold. Its natural harbour soon developed into a commercial area competing with Río de la Plata's capital, Buenos Aires. Uruguay's early 19th-century history was shaped by ongoing fights for dominance in the Platine region between British, Spanish, Portuguese, and other colonial forces. In 1806 and 1807, the British army attempted to seize Buenos Aires and Montevideo as part of the Napoleonic Wars. Montevideo was occupied by British forces from February to September 1807.

=== Independence struggle ===
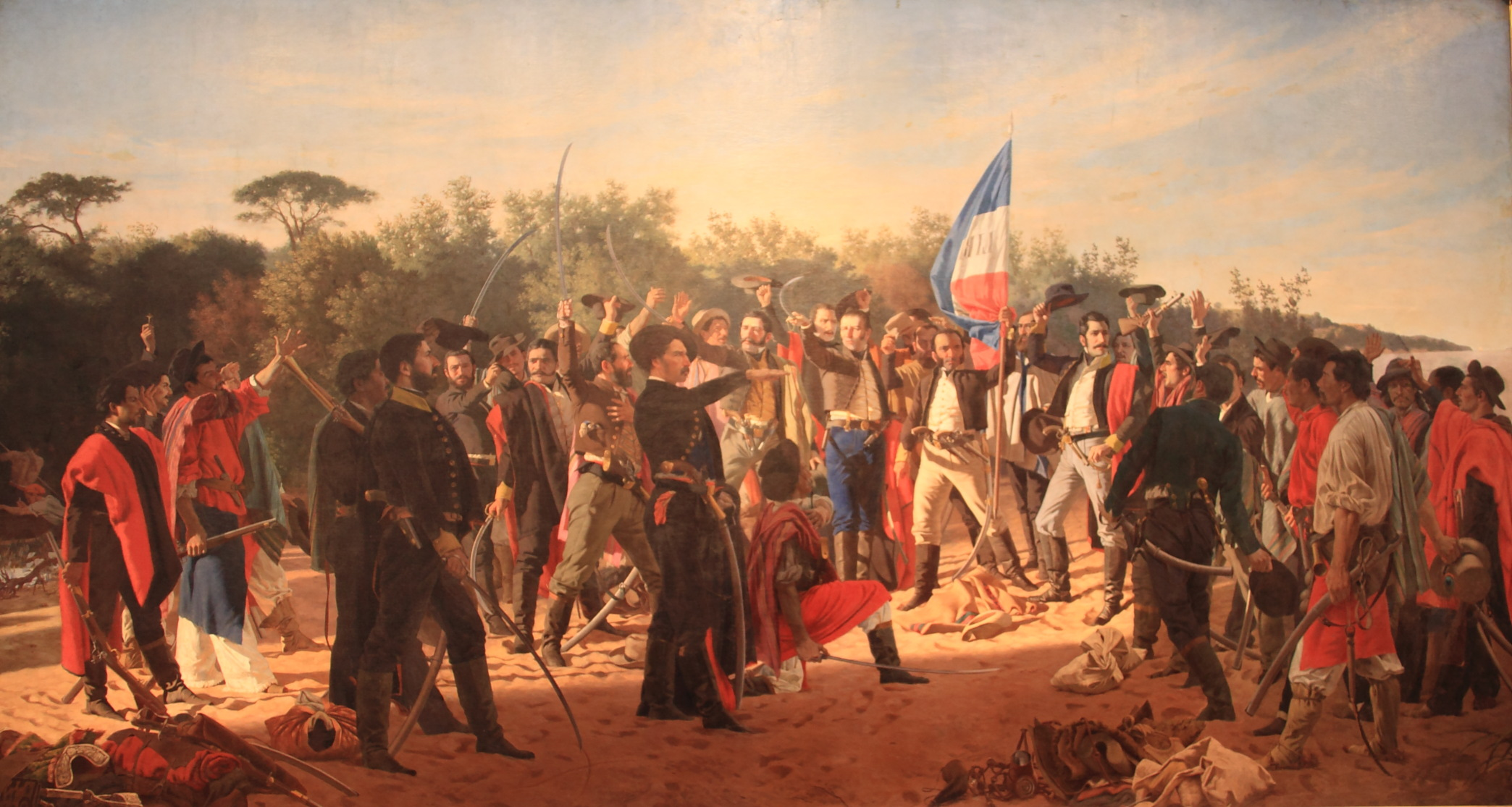
In 1825, The oath of the Thirty-Three Orientals set in motion the process in which Uruguay gained independence from the Empire of Brazil.

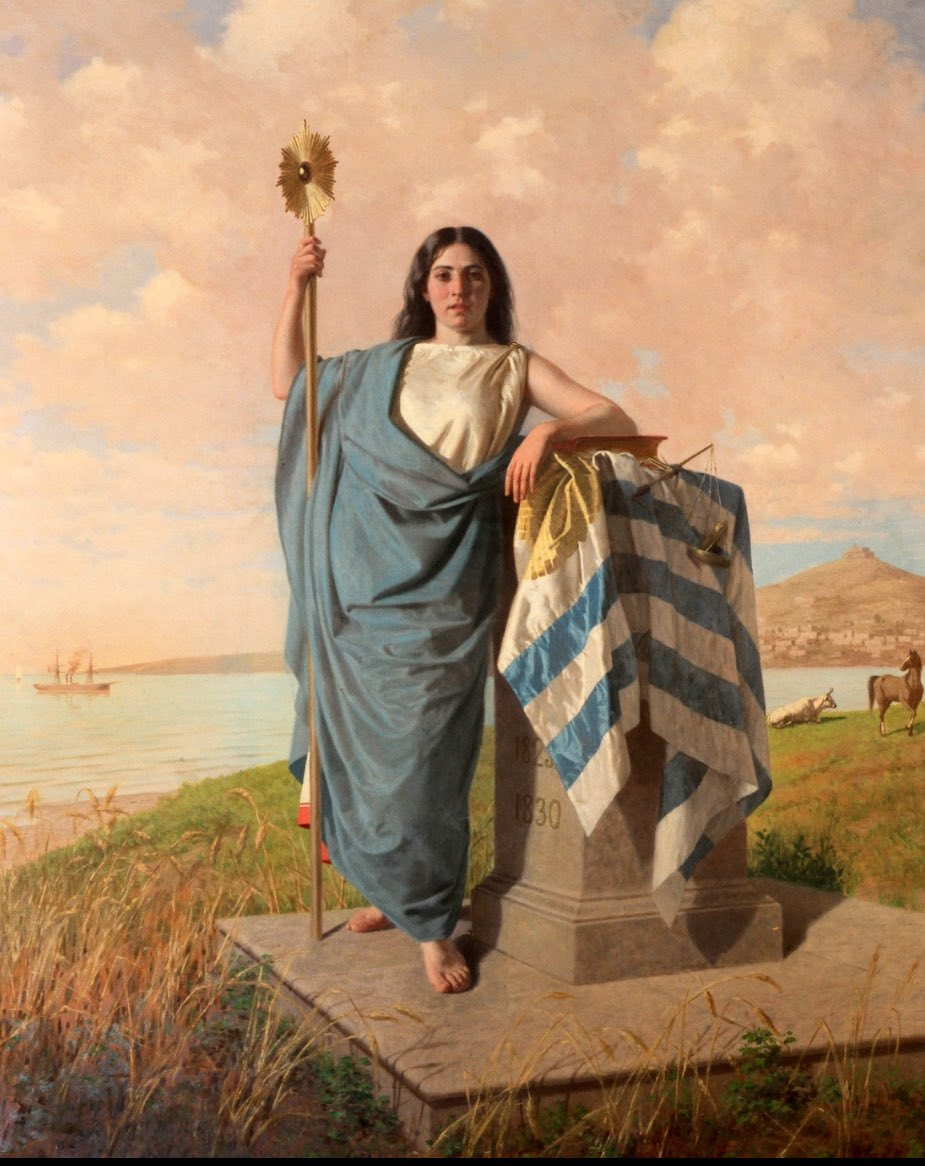
National personification of Uruguay by Juan Manuel Blanes

In 1811, José Gervasio Artigas, who became Uruguay's national hero, launched a successful revolt against the Spanish authorities, defeating them on 18 May at the Battle of Las Piedras. In 1813, the new government in Buenos Aires convened a constituent assembly where Artigas emerged as a champion of federalism, demanding political and economic autonomy for each area and the Banda Oriental in particular. The assembly refused to seat the delegates from the Banda Oriental; however, Buenos Aires pursued a system based on unitary centralism.

As a result, Artigas broke with Buenos Aires and besieged Montevideo, taking the city in early 1815. Once the troops from Buenos Aires had withdrawn, the Banda Oriental appointed its first autonomous government. Artigas organised the Federal League under his protection, consisting of six provinces, five of which later became part of Argentina.

In 1816, 10,000 Portuguese troops invaded the Banda Oriental from Brazil; they took Montevideo in January 1817. After nearly four more years of struggle, the Portuguese Kingdom of Brazil annexed the Banda Oriental as a province under the name of "Cisplatina". The Brazilian Empire became independent of Portugal in 1822. In response to the annexation, the Thirty-Three Orientals, led by Juan Antonio Lavalleja, declared independence on 25 August 1825, supported by the United Provinces of the Río de la Plata (present-day Argentina). This led to the 500-day-long Cisplatine War. Neither side gained the upper hand, and in 1828, the Treaty of Montevideo, fostered by the United Kingdom through the diplomatic efforts of Viscount John Ponsonby, gave birth to Uruguay as an independent state. 25 August is celebrated as Independence Day, a national holiday. The nation's first constitution was adopted on 18 July 1830. The country was officially the Oriental State of Uruguay.

=== 19th century ===
At the time of independence, Uruguay had an estimated population of just under 75,000. The political scene in Uruguay became split between two parties: the conservative Blancos (Whites), headed by the second President Manuel Oribe, representing the agricultural interests of the countryside, and the liberal Colorados (Reds), led by the first President Fructuoso Rivera, representing the business interests of Montevideo. The Uruguayan parties received support from warring political factions in neighbouring Argentina, which became involved in Uruguayan affairs.

The Colorados favoured the exiled Argentine liberal Unitarios, many of whom had taken refuge in Montevideo, while the Blanco president Manuel Oribe was a close friend of the Argentine ruler Manuel de Rosas. On 15 June 1838, an army led by the Colorado leader Rivera overthrew President Oribe, who fled to Argentina. Rivera declared war on Rosas in 1839. The conflict would last 13 years and become known as the Guerra Grande (the Great War). In 1843, an Argentine army overran Uruguay on Oribe's behalf but failed to take the capital. The siege of Montevideo began in February 1843 and lasted nine years. The besieged Uruguayans called on resident foreigners for help, which led to a French and an Italian legion being formed, the latter led by the exiled Giuseppe Garibaldi.

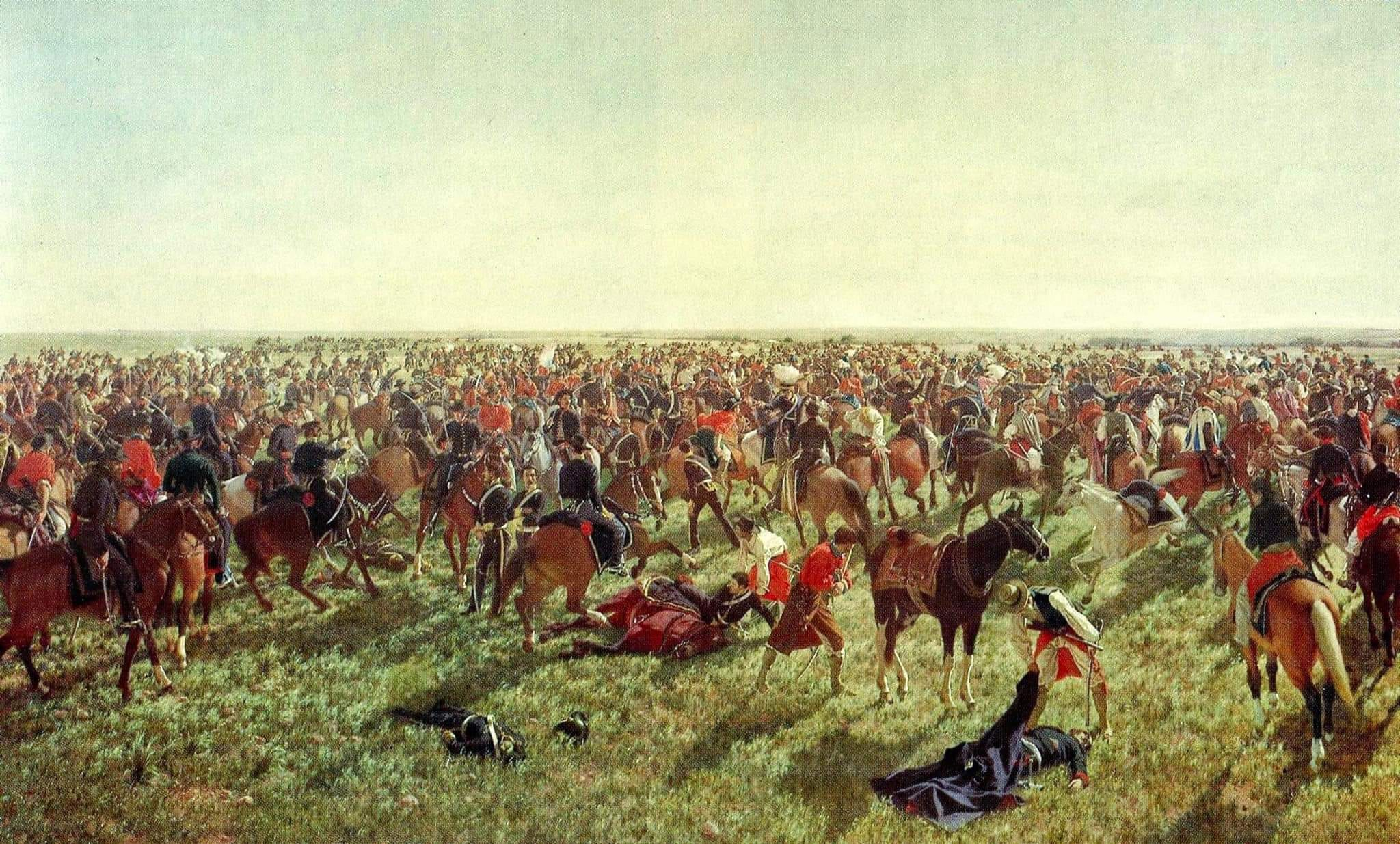
In 1825, in the Battle of Sarandí, Uruguayan troops first defeated the Brazilian Empire.

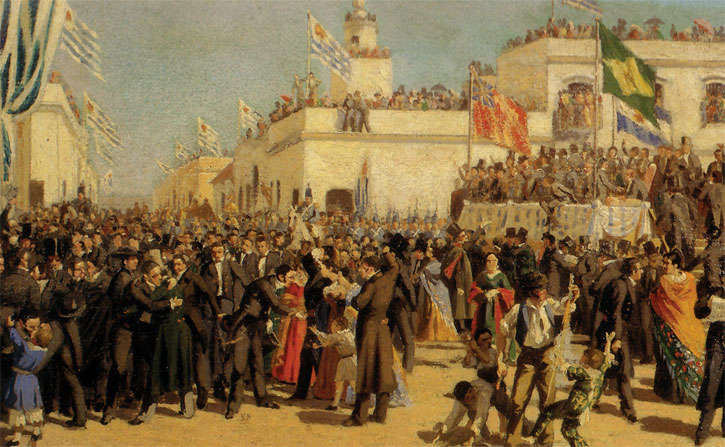
On 18 July 1830, Uruguay proclaimed its first Constitution, a significant event that marked the end of the independence process.

In 1845, Britain and France intervened against Rosas to restore commerce to normal levels in the region. Their efforts proved ineffective, and by 1849, tired of the war, both withdrew after signing a treaty favourable to Rosas. It appeared that Montevideo would finally fall when an uprising against Rosas, led by Justo José de Urquiza, governor of Argentina's Entre Ríos Province, began. The Brazilian intervention in May 1851 on behalf of the Colorados, combined with the uprising, changed the situation, and Oribe was defeated. The siege of Montevideo was lifted, and the Guerra Grande finally came to an end. Montevideo rewarded Brazil's support by signing treaties that confirmed Brazil's right to intervene in Uruguay's internal affairs.

In accordance with the 1851 treaties, Brazil intervened militarily in Uruguay as often as it deemed necessary. In 1865, the Triple Alliance was formed by the emperor of Brazil, the president of Argentina, and the Colorado general Venancio Flores, the Uruguayan head of government whom they both had helped to gain power. The Triple Alliance declared war on the Paraguayan leader Francisco Solano López. The resulting Paraguayan War ended with the invasion of Paraguay and its defeat by the armies of the three countries. Montevideo was used as a supply station by the Brazilian navy, and it experienced a period of prosperity and relative calm during the war.

The first railway line was assembled in Uruguay in 1867, and a branch consisting of a horse-drawn train was opened. The present-day State Railways Administration of Uruguay maintains 2,900 km (1,800 mi) of extendable railway network.

The constitutional government of General Lorenzo Batlle y Grau (1868–72) suppressed the Revolution of the Lances by the Blancos. After two years of struggle, a peace agreement was signed in 1872 that gave the Blancos a share in the emoluments and functions of government through control of four of the departments of Uruguay. This establishment of the policy of co-participation represented the search for a new formula of compromise based on the coexistence of the party in power and the opposition party. Despite this agreement, the Colorado rule was threatened by the failed Tricolor Revolution in 1875 and the Revolution of the Quebracho in 1886.

The Colorado effort to reduce Blancos to only three departments caused a Blanco uprising of 1897, which ended with creating 16 departments, of which the Blancos now had control over six. Blancos were given ⅓ seats in Congress. This division of power lasted until President Jose Batlle y Ordonez instituted his political reforms, which caused the last uprising by Blancos in 1904 that ended with the Battle of Masoller and the death of Blanco leader Aparicio Saravia.

Between 1875 and 1890, the centre of power shifted toward the military. During this authoritarian period, the government took steps toward the organisation of the country as a modern state, encouraging its economic and social transformation. Pressure groups (consisting mainly of businessmen, hacendados, and industrialists) were organised and had a strong influence on the government. A transition period (1886–90) followed, during which politicians began recovering lost ground, and some civilian participation in government occurred. After the Guerra Grande, there was a sharp rise in the number of immigrants, primarily from Italy and Spain. By 1879, the total population of the country was over 438,500. The economy reflected a steep upswing (if demonstrated graphically, above all other related economic determinants) in livestock raising and exports. Montevideo became a major financial centre of the region and an entrepôt for goods from Argentina, Brazil, and Paraguay.

=== 20th century ===
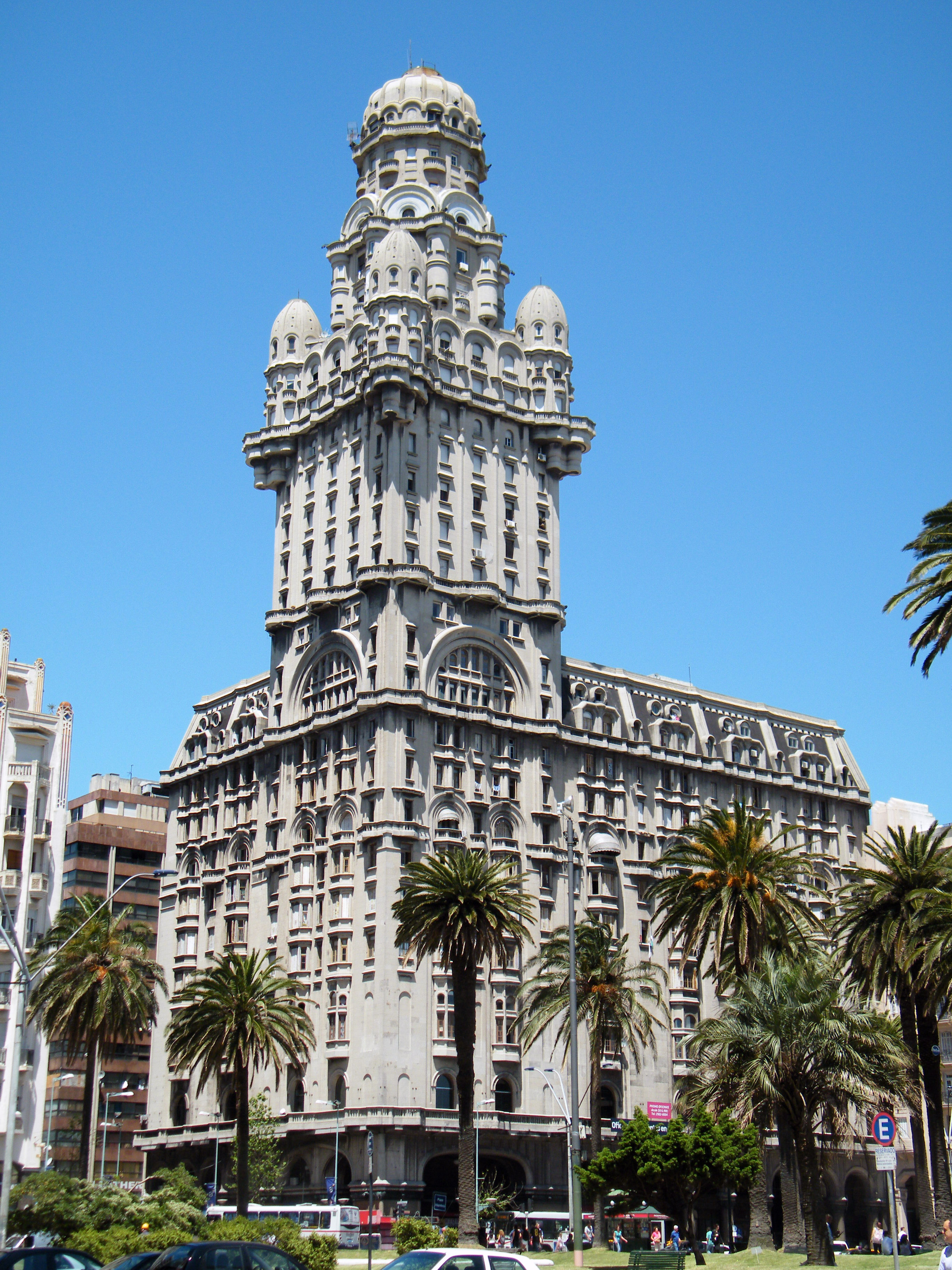
Palacio Salvo, built in Montevideo from 1925 to 1928, was once the tallest building in Latin America.

The Colorado leader José Batlle y Ordóñez was elected president in 1903. The following year, the Blancos led a rural revolt, and eight bloody months of fighting ensued before their leader, Aparicio Saravia, was killed in battle. Government forces emerged victorious, leading to the end of the co-participation politics that had begun in 1872. Batlle had two terms (1903–07 and 1911–15) during which he instituted major reforms, such as a welfare program, government participation in the economy, and a plural executive.

Gabriel Terra became president in March 1931. His inauguration coincided with the effects of the Great Depression, and the social climate became tense as a result of the lack of jobs. There were confrontations in which police and leftists died. In 1933, Terra organised a coup d'état, dissolving the General Assembly and governing by decree. A new constitution was promulgated in 1934, transferring powers to the president. In general, the Terra government weakened or neutralised economic nationalism and social reform.

In 1938, general elections were held, and Terra's brother-in-law, General Alfredo Baldomir, was elected president. Under pressure from organised labour and the National Party, Baldomir advocated free elections, freedom of the press, and a new constitution. Although Baldomir declared Uruguay neutral in 1939, British warships and the German ship Admiral Graf Spee fought a battle not far off Uruguay's coast. The Admiral Graf Spee took refuge in Montevideo, claiming sanctuary in a neutral port, but was later ordered out.

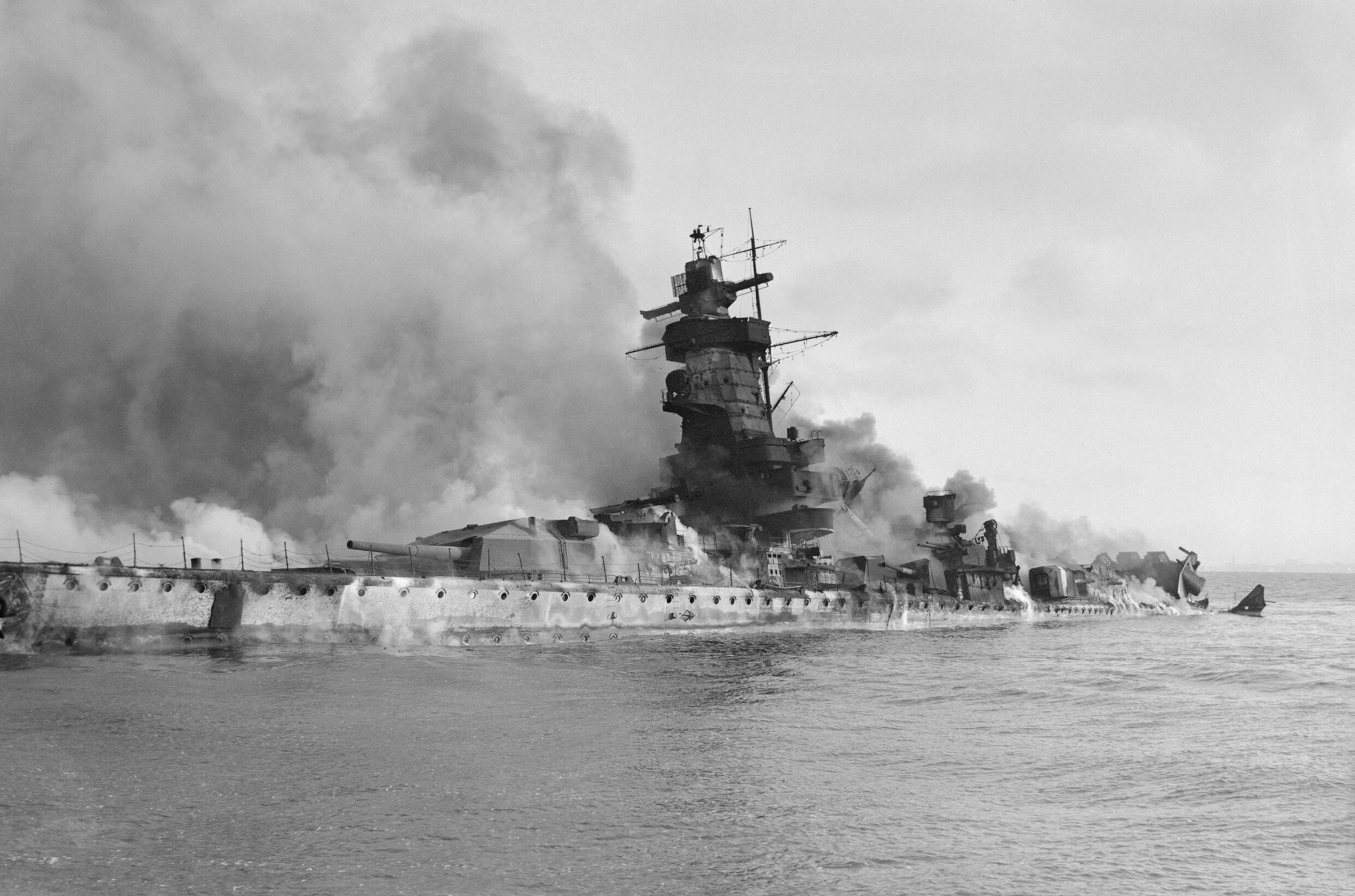
The sinking of the German cruiser Admiral Graf Spee was the major event occurring in Uruguay during World War II.

In 1945, Uruguay formally signed the Declaration by the United Nations and entered World War II, leading the country to declare war on Germany and Japan. Following the end of the war, it became a founding member of the United Nations.

An armed group of Marxist–Leninist urban guerrillas, known as the Tupamaros, emerged in the 1960s, engaging in activities such as bank robbery, kidnapping, and assassination, in addition to attempting an overthrow of the government.

=== Civic-military dictatorship ===
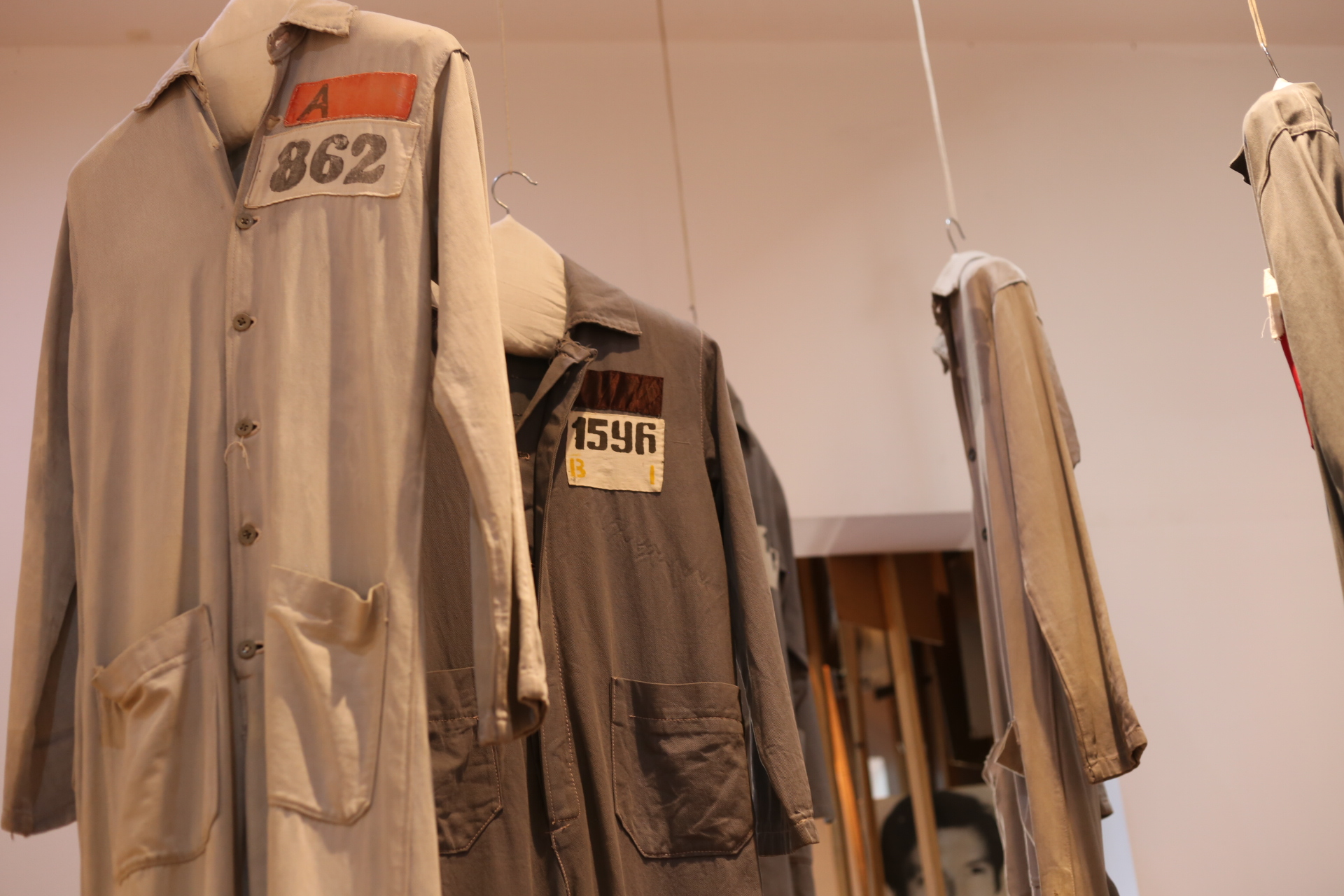
Garments worn by prisoners during the dictatorship, exhibited at the Museum of Memory

President Jorge Pacheco declared a state of emergency in 1968, followed by a further suspension of civil liberties in 1972. In 1973, amid increasing economic and political turmoil, the armed forces, asked by President Juan María Bordaberry, disbanded Parliament and established a civilian-military regime. The CIA-backed campaign of political repression and state terror involving intelligence operations and assassination of opponents was called Operation Condor.

According to one source, around 180 Uruguayans are known to have been killed and disappeared, with thousands more illegally detained and tortured during the 12-year civil-military rule from 1973 to 1985. Most were killed in Argentina and other neighbouring countries, with 36 of them having been killed in Uruguay. According to Edy Kaufman (cited by David Altman), Uruguay at the time had the highest per capita number of political prisoners in the world. "Kaufman, who spoke at the U.S. Congressional Hearings of 1976 on behalf of Amnesty International, estimated that one in every five Uruguayans went into exile, one in fifty were detained, and one in five hundred went to prison (most of them tortured)." Social spending was reduced, and many state-owned companies were privatised. However, the economy did not improve and deteriorated after 1980; the gross domestic product (GDP) fell by 20%, and unemployment rose to 17%. The state intervened by trying to bail out failing companies and banks.

=== Return to democracy (1984–present) ===
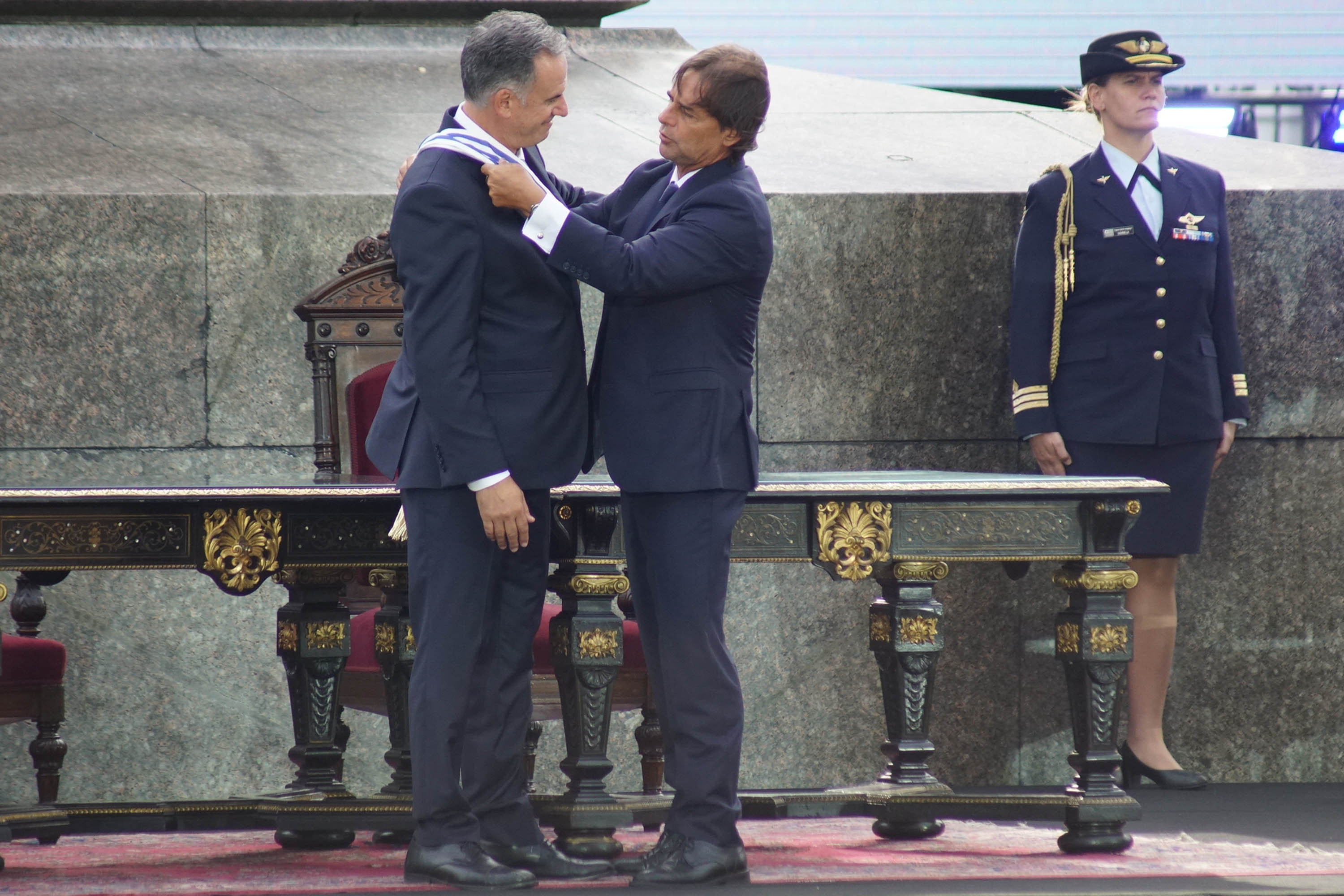
Uruguayan presidents Yamandú Orsi and Luis Lacalle Pou in the inauguration of the former, March 2025

A new constitution, drafted by the military, was rejected in a November 1980 referendum. Following the referendum, the armed forces announced a plan for the return to civilian rule, and national elections were held in 1984. Colorado Party leader Julio María Sanguinetti won the presidency and served from 1985 to 1990. The first Sanguinetti administration implemented economic reforms and consolidated democracy following the country's years under military rule. The National Party's Luis Alberto Lacalle won the 1989 presidential election, and a referendum endorsed amnesty for human rights abusers. Sanguinetti was then reelected in 1994. Both presidents continued the economic structural reforms initiated after the reinstatement of democracy.

The 1999 national elections were held under a new electoral system established by a 1996 constitutional amendment. Colorado Party candidate Jorge Batlle, aided by the support of the National Party, defeated Broad Front candidate Tabaré Vázquez. The formal coalition ended in November 2002, when the Blancos withdrew their ministers from the cabinet, although the Blancos continued to support the Colorados on most issues. Low commodity prices and economic difficulties in Uruguay's main export markets (starting in Brazil with the devaluation of the real, then in Argentina in 2002) caused a severe recession; the economy contracted by 11%, unemployment climbed to 21%, and the percentage of Uruguayans in poverty rose to over 30%.

In 2004, Uruguayans elected Tabaré Vázquez as president while giving the Broad Front a majority in both houses of Parliament. Vázquez stuck to economic orthodoxy. As commodity prices soared and the economy recovered from the recession, he tripled foreign investment, cut poverty and unemployment, cut public debt from 79% of GDP to 60%, and kept inflation steady. In 2009, José Mujica, a former left-wing guerrilla leader (Tupamaros) who spent almost 15 years in prison during the country's military rule, emerged as the new president as the Broad Front won the election for a second time. Abortion was legalised in 2012, followed by same-sex marriage and cannabis in the following year, making Uruguay the first country in the modern era to legalise cannabis.

In 2014, Tabaré Vázquez was elected to a non-consecutive second presidential term, which began on 1 March 2015. In 2020, after 15 years of left-wing rule, he was succeeded by Luis Alberto Lacalle Pou, a member of the conservative National Party, as the 42nd President of Uruguay. On 1 March 2025, Yamandu Orsi took office as Uruguay's new president, as the left-wing coalition of the Broad Front returned to power after a five-year interruption.

== Geography ==
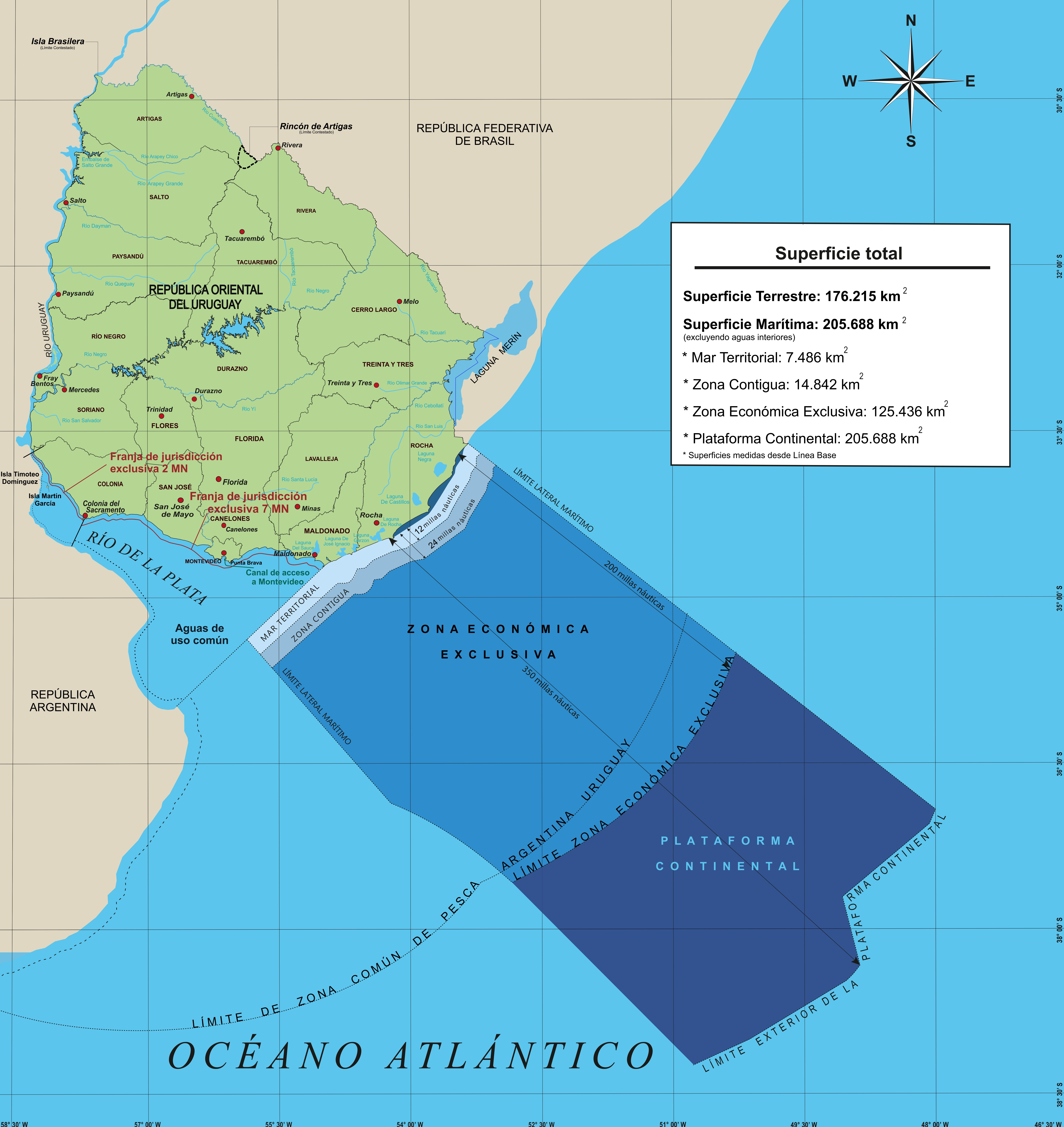
Map of Uruguay; including its 19 departments, territorial sea, exclusive economic zone and extended continental shelf

With 176,214 km^{2} (68,037 sq mi) of continental land and 125,436 km^{2} (48,431 sq mi) of territorial waters, Uruguay is the second-smallest sovereign nation in South America (after Suriname) and the third smallest territory (French Guiana is the smallest). The landscape features mostly rolling plains and low hill ranges (cuchillas) with a fertile coastal lowland. Uruguay has 660 km (410 mi) of coastline. The highest point in the country is the Cerro Catedral, whose peak reaches 514 m (1,686 ft) AMSL in the Sierra Carapé hill range. To the southwest is the Río de la Plata, the estuary of the Uruguay River (the river which forms the country's western border).

A dense fluvial network covers the country, consisting of four river basins, or deltas: the Río de la Plata Basin, the Uruguay River, the Laguna Merín, and the Río Negro. The major internal river is the Río Negro ("Black River"), dammed in 1945, resulting in the formation of the artificial Rincón del Bonete Lake in the heart of Uruguay. Several lagoons are found along the Atlantic coast.

Montevideo is the southernmost national capital in the Americas and the third most southerly in the world (after Canberra and Wellington). Uruguay is the only country in South America situated entirely south of the Tropic of Capricorn, and is the southernmost sovereign state in the world when ordered by northernmost point of latitude. There are ten national parks in Uruguay: Five in the wetland areas of the east, three in the central hill country, and one in the west along the Rio Uruguay. Uruguay is home to the Uruguayan savanna terrestrial ecoregion. The country had a 2019 Forest Landscape Integrity Index mean score of 3.61/10, ranking it 147th globally out of 172 countries.

=== Climate ===
Köppen–Geiger climate classification map for Uruguay

Located entirely within the southern temperate zone, Uruguay has a climate that is relatively mild and fairly uniform nationwide. According to the Köppen climate classification, most of the country has a humid subtropical climate (Cfa). Only in some spots of the Atlantic Coast and at the summit of the highest hills of the Cuchilla Grande is the climate oceanic (Cfb).

The country experiences four seasons, with summer from December to March and winter from June to September. Seasonal variations are pronounced, but extremes in temperature are rare. Summers are tempered by winds off the Atlantic, and severe cold in winter is unknown. Although it never gets too cold, frosts occur every year during the winter months, and precipitation such as sleet and hail occur almost every winter, but snow is very rare; it does occur every couple of years at higher elevations, but almost always without accumulation. As would be expected with its abundance of water, high humidity and fog are common.

The absence of mountains, which act as weather barriers, makes all locations vulnerable to high winds and rapid changes in weather as fronts or storms sweep across the country. These storms can be strong; they can bring squalls, hail, and sometimes even tornadoes. The country experiences extratropical cyclones but no tropical cyclones, due to the fact that the South Atlantic Ocean is rarely warm enough for their development. Both summer and winter weather may vary from day to day with the passing of storm fronts, where a hot northerly wind may occasionally be followed by a cold wind (pampero) from the Argentine Pampas.

Even though both temperature and precipitation are quite uniform nationwide, there are considerable differences across the territory. The average annual temperature of the country is 17.5 °C (63.5 °F), ranging from 16 °C (61 °F) in the southeast to 19 °C (66 °F) in the northwest. Winter temperatures range from a daily average of 11 °C (52 °F) in the south to 14 °C (57 °F) in the north, while summer average daily temperatures range from 21 °C (70 °F) in the southeast to 25 °C (77 °F) in the northwest. The southeast is considerably cooler than the rest of the country, especially during spring, when the ocean with cold water after the winter cools down the temperature of the air and brings more humidity to that region. However, the south of the country receives less precipitation than the north. For example, Montevideo receives approximately 1,100 mm (43 in) of precipitation per year, while the city of Rivera in the northeast receives 1,600 mm (63 in). The heaviest precipitation occurs during the autumn months, although more frequent rainy spells occur in winter. But periods of drought or excessive rain can occur anytime during the year.

National extreme temperatures at sea level are 44 °C (111 °F) in Paysandú city (20 January 1943) and Florida city (14 January 2022) and −11.0 °C (12.2 °F) in Melo city (14 June 1967).

== Government and politics ==
=== Government ===
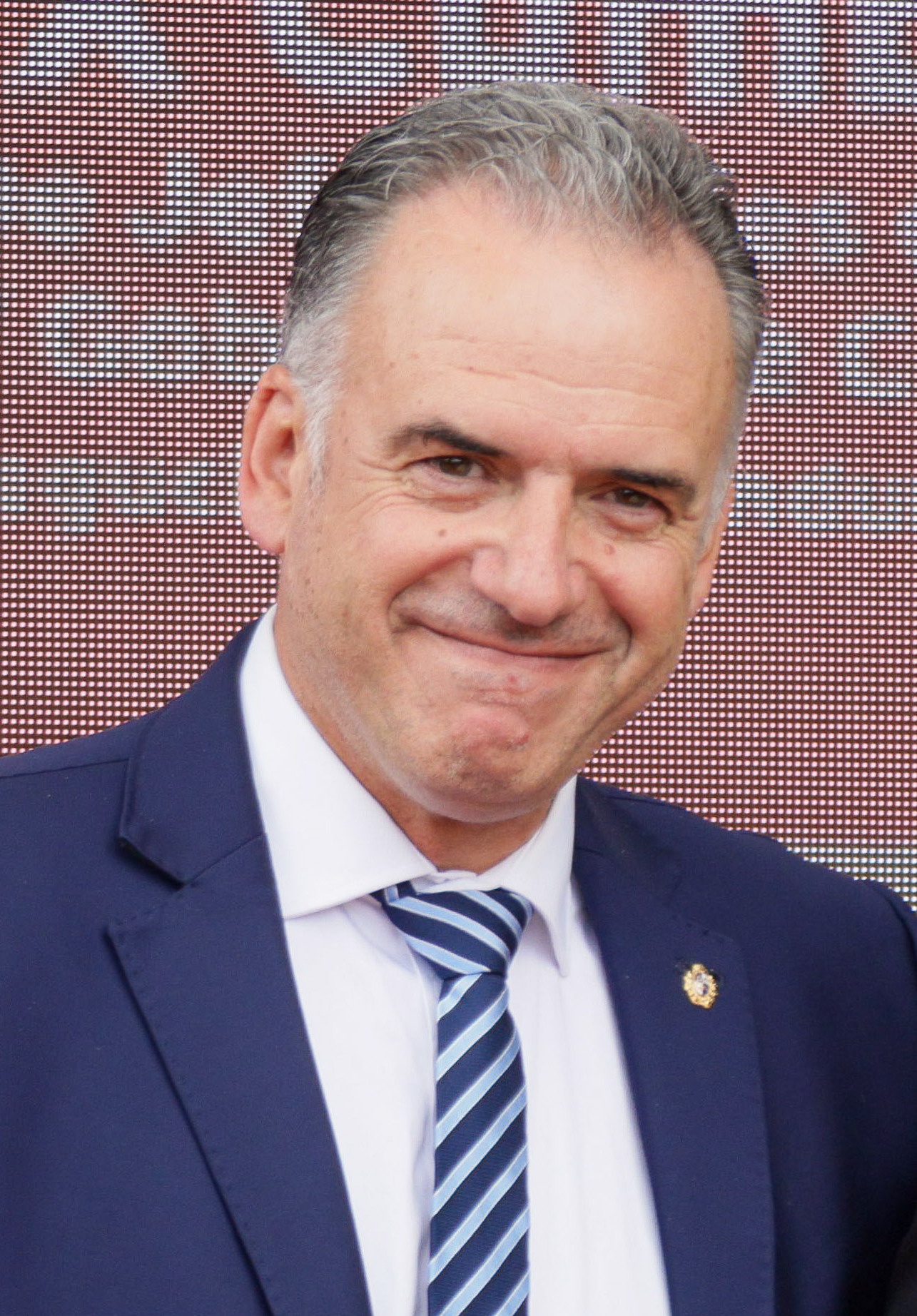
Yamandú Orsi
President

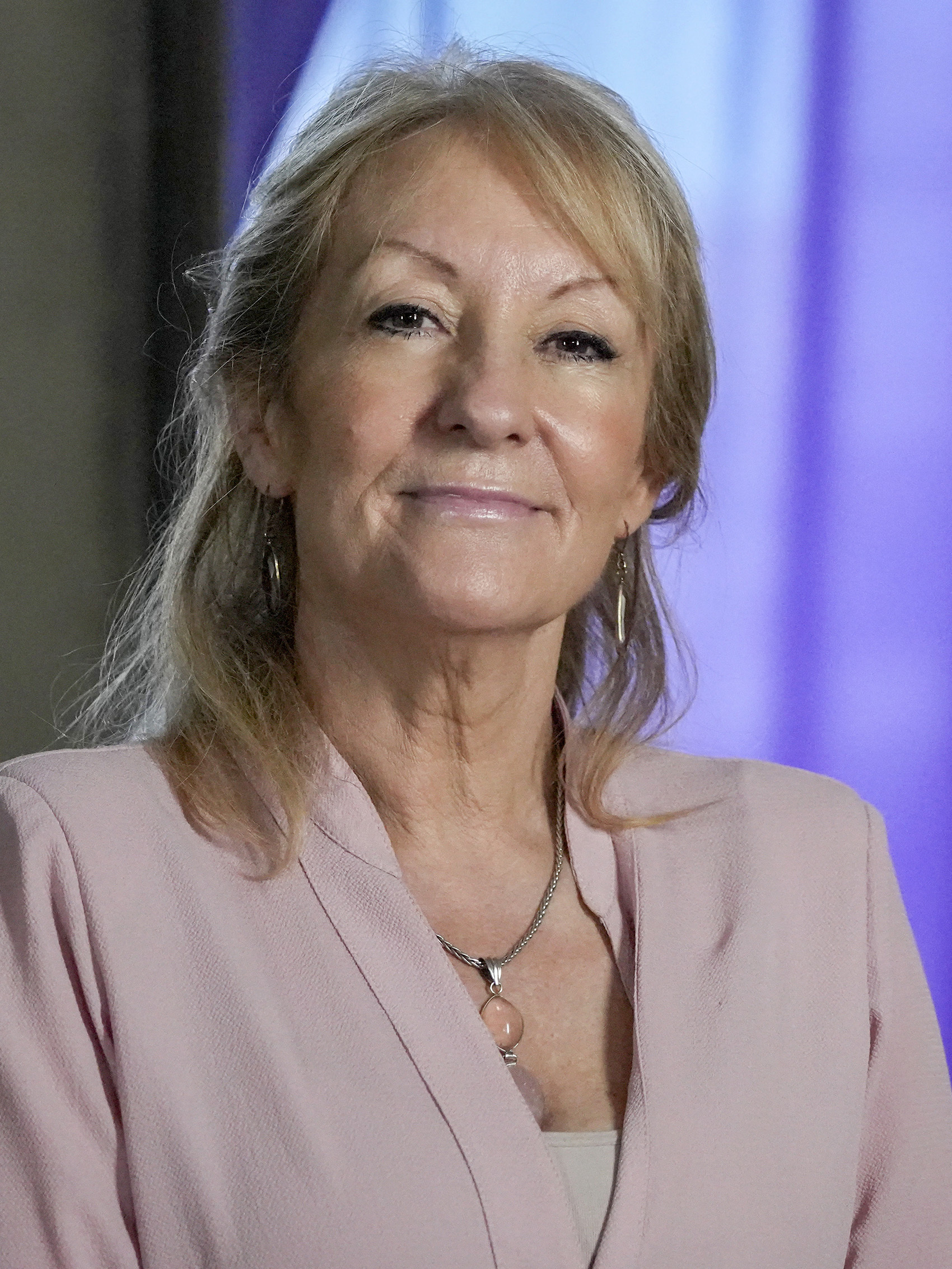
Carolina Cosse
Vice-President

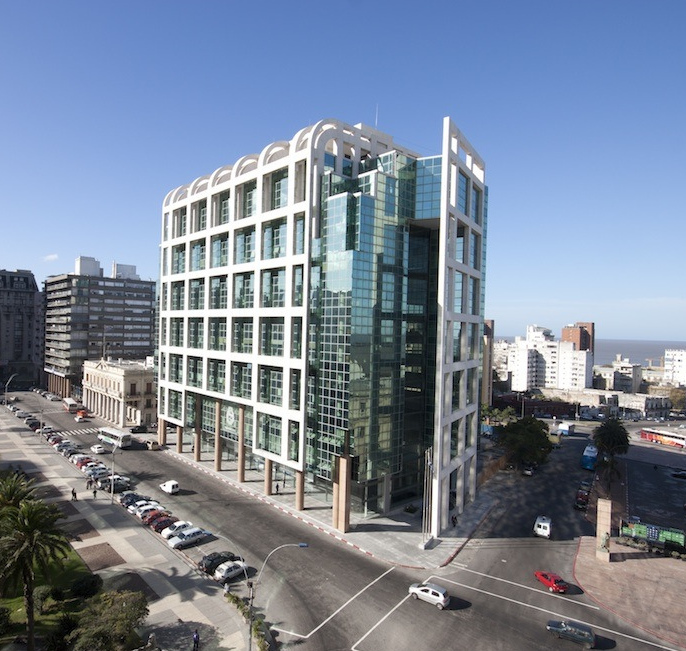
Executive Tower, seat of the Executive Branch and office to the president of the Republic.

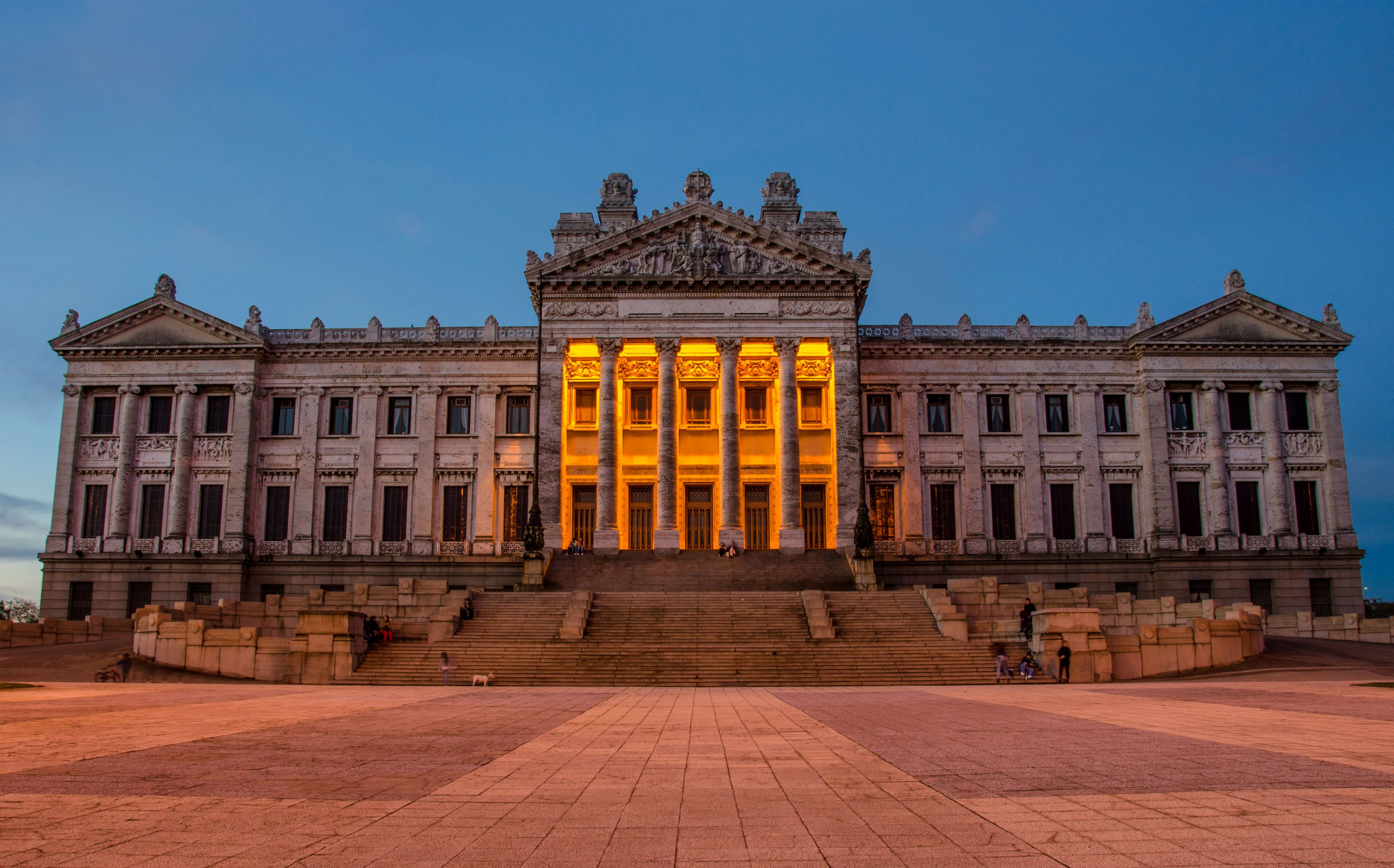
Legislative Palace, seat of the Uruguayan Parliament.

Palacio Piria, seat of the Supreme Court.

Uruguay is a representative democratic republic with a presidential system. The Uruguayan Constitution establishes a separation of powers intended to provide a system of checks and balances and members of government are elected for a five-year term by a universal suffrage system. Uruguay is a unitary state: justice, education, health, security, foreign policy and defence are all administered nationwide.

The Executive branch is exercised by the president of the Republic who serves both as head of state and head of government, along with a Council of Ministers of 14 members. Together with the Vice-President, the President is elected through a direct popular vote for a five-year term, with no possibility of immediate re-election. Each party presents a single presidential ticket—determined through primary elections—and the winning ticket must receive an absolute majority of votes.

The Legislative branch is constituted by the General Assembly, a bicameral legislature made up of the Chamber of Representatives and the Chamber of Senators. The former consists of 99 members representing the 19 departments, elected for a five-year term based on proportional representation, while the latter comprises 31 members—30 elected for five-year terms by proportional representation—and the Vice-President, who presides over the chamber and has the right to vote. Parliamentary elections are held jointly with the presidential election in a general vote.

The Judicial branch is headed by the Supreme Court, whose members—known as "Ministers"—are appointed by the General Assembly with a two-thirds majority and serve ten-year terms or until reaching the age of 70. The Court functions as the highest appellate body and the court of last resort, while also reviewing the constitutionality of laws. Below it are the Courts of Appeals—each composed of three members—and the Lawyer Judges and the Justices of the Peace, the latter two being single-member courts, with all appointed by the Supreme Court.

Uruguay adopted its current constitution in 1967, with the most recent reform occurring in 1997. Drawing on Switzerland and its use of the initiative, the Uruguayan Constitution allows citizens to propose bills, call for referendums to repeal laws, and submit constitutional reform proposals, which are ultimately decided in a nationwide referendum.

For most of Uruguay's history, the country was characterised by a two-party system between the Colorado and National parties, although the former held power for longer periods. At certain times, Uruguay has had periods of collegial executive governance. The earlier period, under the National Council of Administration (1919–1933), was a diarchic system in which the Council shared executive power with the President and Cabinet. The later period, under the National Council of Government (1952–1967), authority was largely concentrated in the Council itself, which acted as the sole executive body.

In 2024, Uruguay was classified as a "full democracy" by The Economist's Democracy Index, ranking 15th globally and first in Latin America. Latinobarómetro surveys consistently place the country among the highest in terms of public support for democracy and satisfaction with it. Moreover, according to the 2023 V-Dem Democracy Indices, Uruguay ranked 31st in the world for electoral democracy and 2nd globally—behind Switzerland—for citizen-initiated direct democracy.

=== Administrative divisions ===
Uruguay is divided into 19 departments.

Uruguay is divided into 19 departments whose local administrations replicate the division of the executive and legislative powers. Each department elects its own authorities through a universal suffrage system. The departmental executive authority resides in a superintendent and the legislative authority in a departmental board.

Department	Capital	Area		Population (2023 census)
Department	Capital	km^{2}	sq mi	Population (2023 census)
Artigas	Artigas	11,928	4,605	77,487
Canelones	Canelones	4,536	1,751	608,956
Cerro Largo	Melo	13,648	5,270	91,025
Colonia	Colonia del Sacramento	6,106	2,358	135,797
Durazno	Durazno	11,643	4,495	62,011
Flores	Trinidad	5,144	1,986	26,271
Florida	Florida	10,417	4,022	70,325
Lavalleja	Minas	10,016	3,867	59,175
Maldonado	Maldonado	4,793	1,851	212,951
Montevideo	Montevideo	530	200	1,302,954
Paysandú	Paysandú	13,922	5,375	121,843
Río Negro	Fray Bentos	9,282	3,584	57,334
Rivera	Rivera	9,370	3,620	109,300
Rocha	Rocha	10,551	4,074	80,707
Salto	Salto	14,163	5,468	136,197
San José	San José de Mayo	4,992	1,927	119,714
Soriano	Mercedes	9,008	3,478	83,685
Tacuarembó	Tacuarembó	15,438	5,961	96,013
Treinta y Tres	Treinta y Tres	9,529	3,679	47,706
Total (Note: Total does not include the 1,199 km^{2} (463 sq mi) artificial lakes of the Rio Negro.)	—	175,016	67,574	3,499,451

=== Foreign relations ===
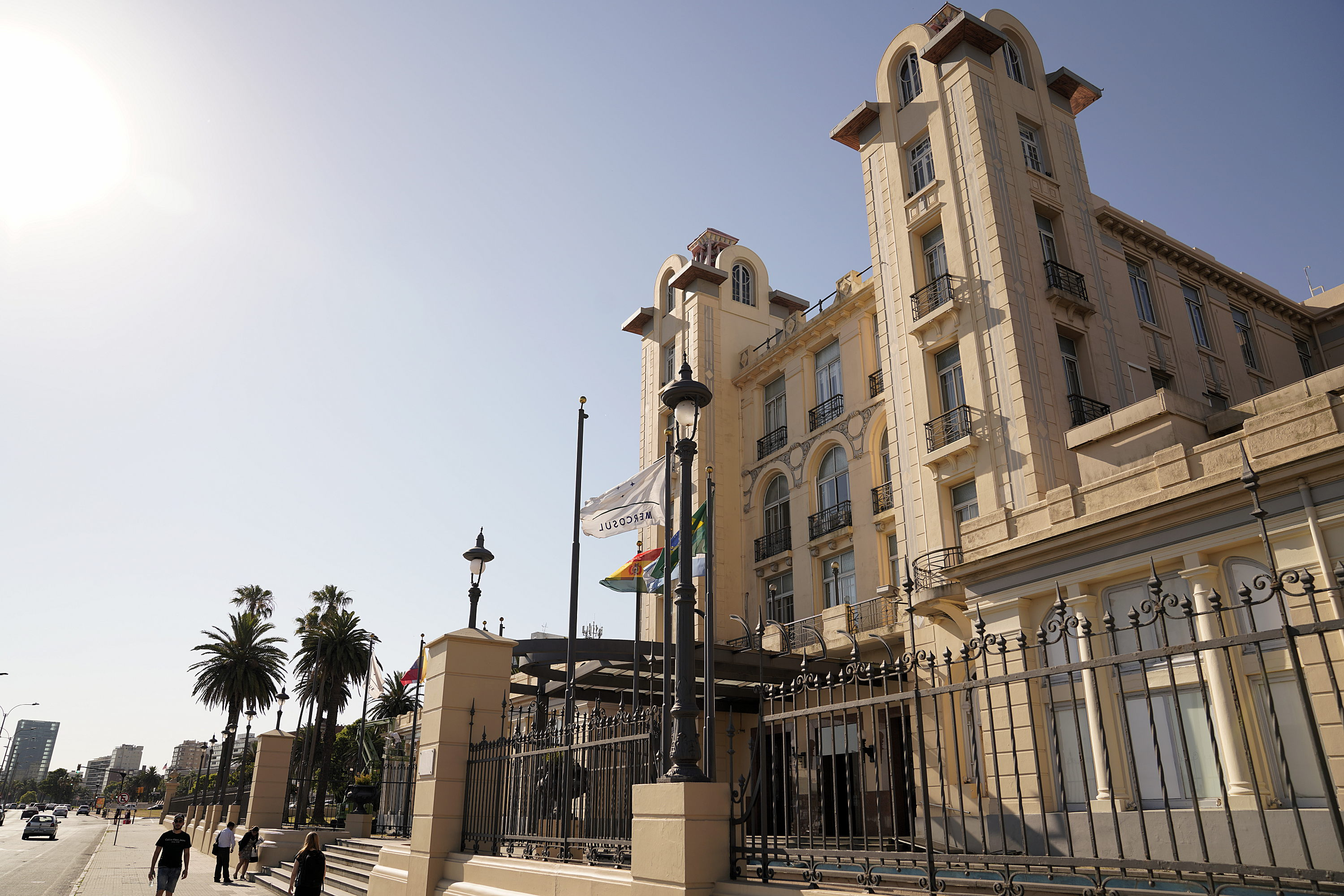
The seat and parliament of Mercosur are located in Montevideo.

The country's foreign policy is directed by the Ministry of Foreign Relations. Uruguay has traditionally had strong political and cultural ties with its neighbouring countries and with Europe, and its international relations have been guided by the principles of non-intervention and multilateralism. The country is a founding member of international organisations such as the United Nations, the Organization of American States, the Southern Common Market, and the Latin American Integration Association. The headquarters of the latter two are located in its capital Montevideo, for which the role of the city has been compared to that of Brussels in Europe.

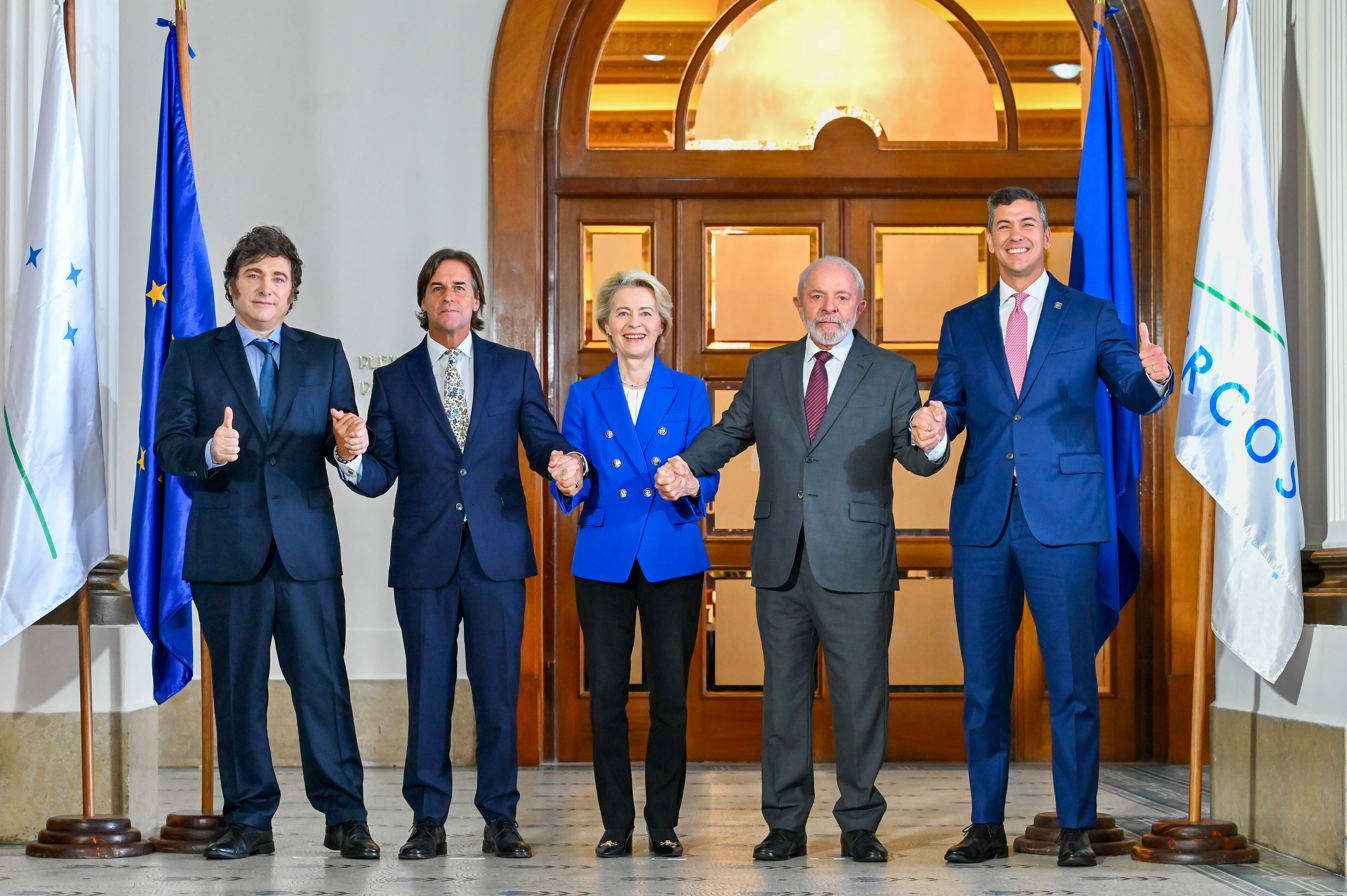
Uruguayan President Luis Lacalle Pou (second from left) at the 65th Mercosur Summit, alongside European Commission President Ursula von der Leyen, 2024

Uruguay has two uncontested boundary disputes with Brazil, over Isla Brasilera and the 235 km^{2} (91 sq mi) Invernada River region near Masoller. The two countries disagree on which tributary represents the legitimate source of the Quaraí/Cuareim River, which would define the border in the latter disputed section, according to the 1851 border treaty between the two countries. The disputed areas remain de facto under Brazilian control, with little to no actual effort by Uruguay to assert its claims. Both countries have friendly diplomatic relations and strong economic ties.

Uruguay is also a founding member of the Forum of Small States (FOSS), a voluntary and informal grouping at the UN. The country has friendly relations with the United States since its transition back to democracy. Commercial ties between both countries have expanded with the signing of a bilateral investment treaty in 2004 and a Trade and Investment Framework Agreement in January 2007. The United States and Uruguay have also cooperated on military matters, with both countries playing significant roles in the United Nations Stabilization Mission in Haiti. In 2017, Uruguay signed the UN treaty on the Prohibition of Nuclear Weapons. It also rejoined the Inter-American Treaty of Reciprocal Assistance (TIAR or "Rio Pact") in 2020.

=== Military ===
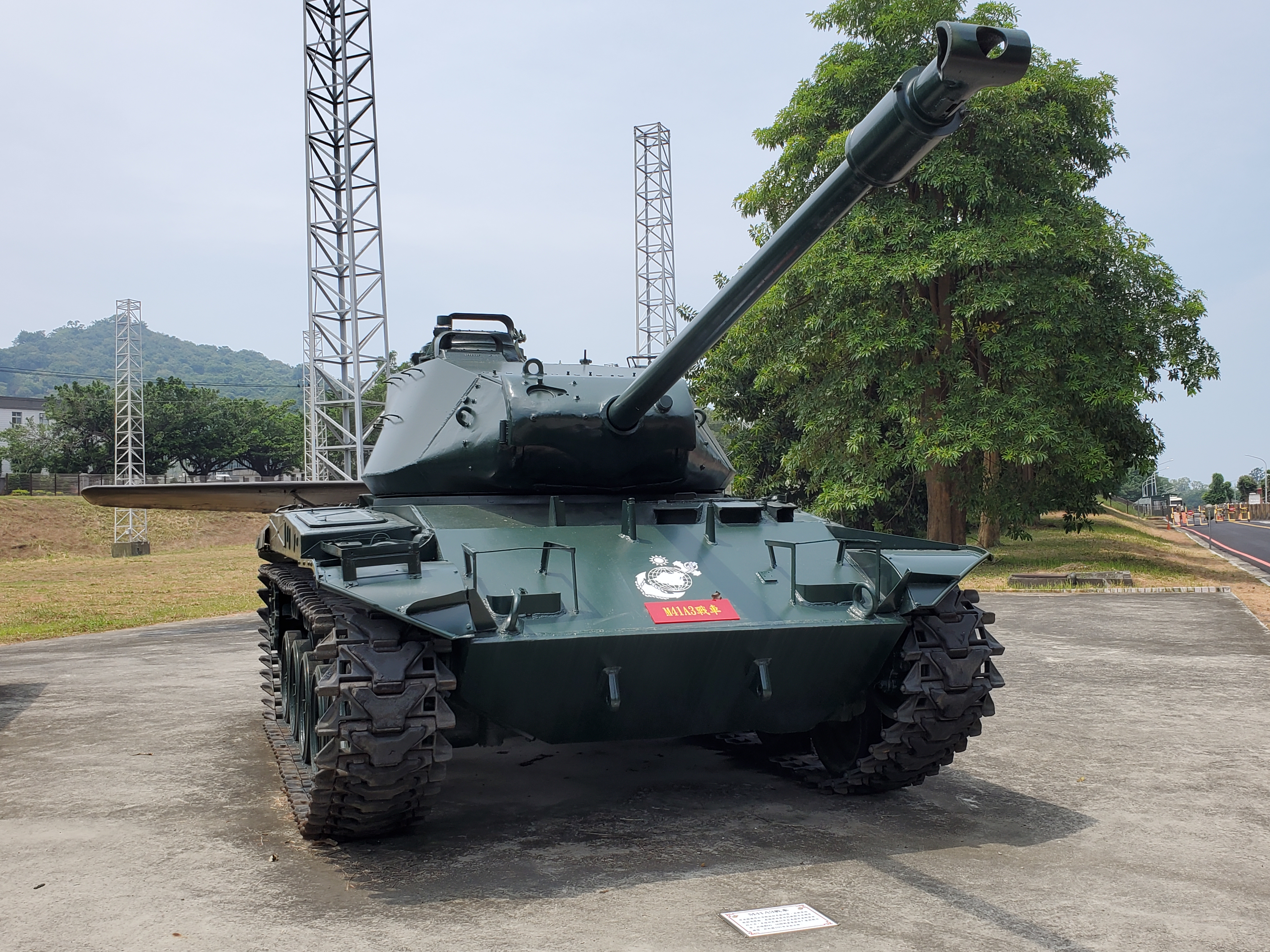
Uruguayan Army M41 Walker Bulldog light tank monument

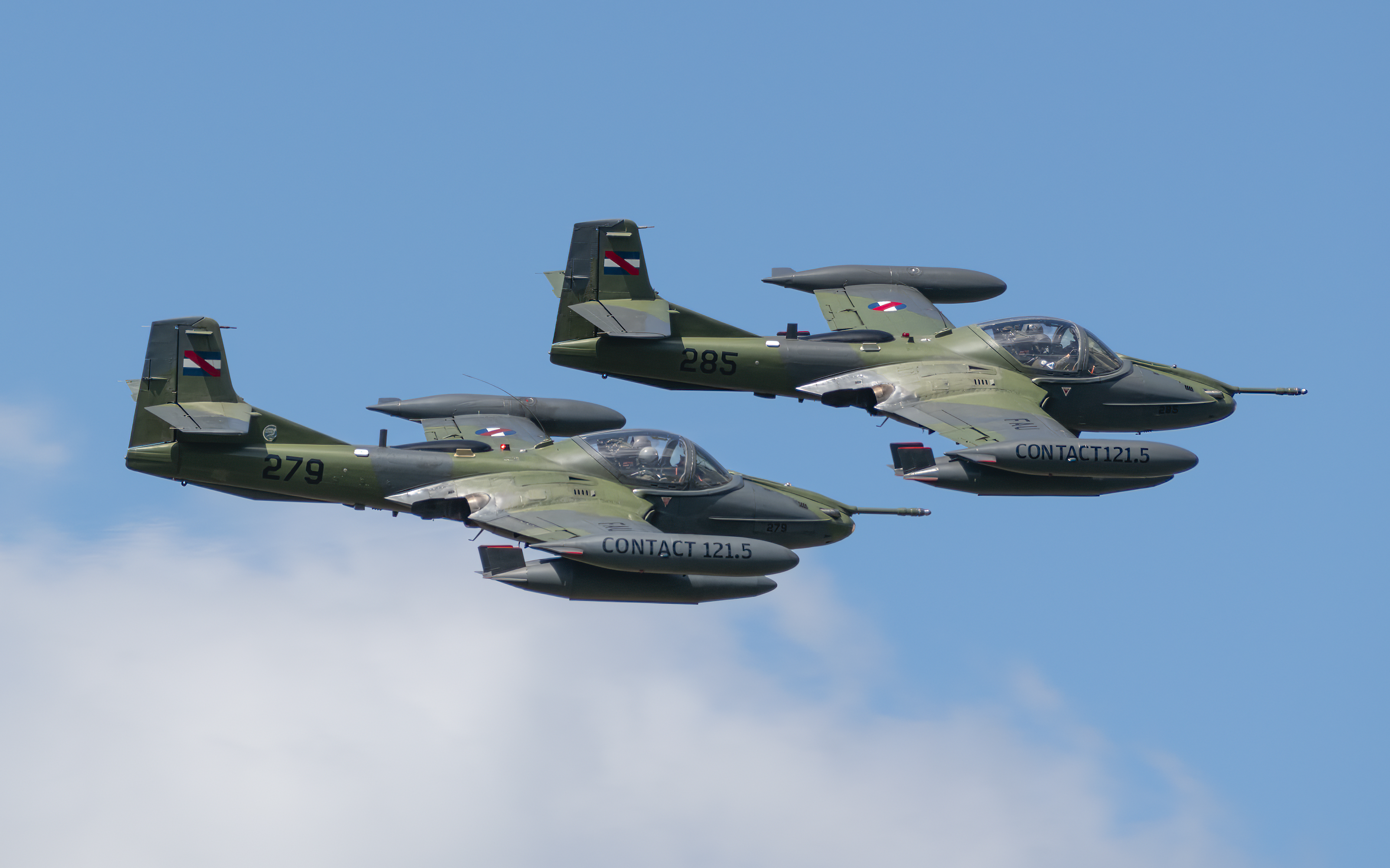
Two Cessna A-37 Dragonfly of the Air Force during a flypast

The Uruguayan Armed Forces are constitutionally subordinate to the president of the Republic, through the minister of defence. Armed forces personnel number about 18,000 for the Army, 6,000 for the Navy, and 3,000 for the Air Force. Enlistment is voluntary in peacetime, but the government has the authority to conscript in emergencies.

Uruguay ranks first in the world on a per capita basis for its contributions to the United Nations peacekeeping forces, with 2,513 soldiers and officers in 10 UN peacekeeping missions. As of February 2010, Uruguay had 1,136 military personnel deployed to Haiti in support of MINUSTAH and 1,360 deployed in support of MONUC in the Congo. In December 2010, Uruguayan Major General Gloodtdofsky, was appointed Chief Military Observer and head of the United Nations Military Observer Group in India and Pakistan.

Since May 2009, homosexuals have been allowed to serve in the military after the defence minister signed a decree stating that military recruitment policy would no longer discriminate on the basis of sexual orientation. In the fiscal year 2010, the United States provided Uruguay with $1.7 million in military assistance, including $1 million in Foreign Military Financing and $480,000 in International Military Education and Training.

== Economy ==
GDP per capita development since 1900

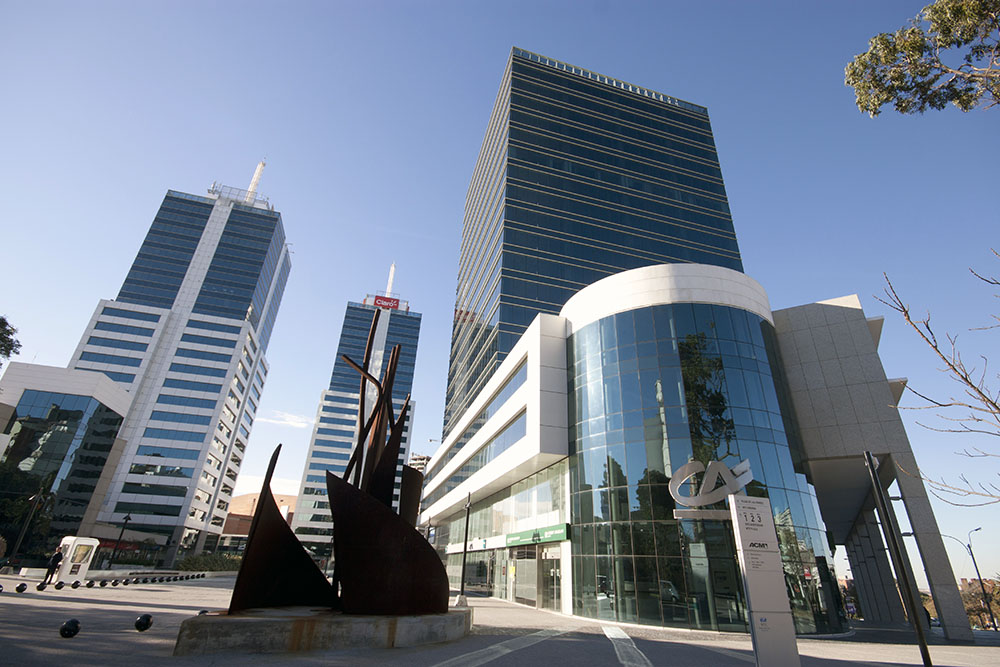
World Trade Center Montevideo

In 1991, the country experienced an increase in strikes to obtain wage compensation to offset inflation and to oppose the privatisations desired by the government of Luis Alberto Lacalle. A general strike was called in 1992, and the privatisation policy was widely rejected by the referendum. In 1994 and 1995, Uruguay faced economic difficulties caused by the liberalisation of foreign trade, which increased the trade deficit. The Montevideo Gas Company and the Pluna airline were turned over to the private sector, but the pace of privatisation slowed down in 1996. Uruguay experienced a major economic and financial crisis between 1999 and 2002, principally a spillover effect from the economic problems of Argentina. The economy contracted by 11%, and unemployment climbed to 14–21%.

In 2004, the Batlle government signed a three-year $1.1 billion stand-by arrangement with the International Monetary Fund (IMF), committing the country to a substantial primary fiscal surplus, low inflation, considerable reductions in external debt, and several structural reforms designed to improve competitiveness and attract foreign investment. Uruguay terminated the agreement in 2006 following the early repayment of its debt but maintained a number of the policy commitments. Vázquez, who assumed the government in March 2005, created the Ministry of Social Development and sought to reduce the country's poverty rate with a $240 million National Plan to Address the Social Emergency (PANES), which provided a monthly conditional cash transfer of approximately $75 to over 100,000 households in extreme poverty. In exchange, those receiving the benefits were required to participate in community work, ensure that their children attended school daily, and have regular health check-ups.

Following the 2001 Argentine credit default, prices in the Uruguayan economy made a variety of services, including information technology and architectural expertise, once too expensive in many foreign markets, exportable. The Frente Amplio government, while continuing payments on Uruguay's external debt, also undertook an emergency plan to attack the widespread problems of poverty and unemployment. The economy grew at an annual rate of 6.7% during the 2004–2008 period. Uruguay's export markets have been diversified to reduce dependency on Argentina and Brazil. Poverty was reduced from 33% in 2002 to 21.7% in July 2008, while extreme poverty dropped from 3.3% to 1.7%.

Between 2007 and 2009, Uruguay was the only country in the Americas that did not technically experience a recession (two consecutive downward quarters). Unemployment reached a record low of 5.4% in December 2010 before rising to 6.1% in January 2011. While unemployment is still at a low level, the IMF observed a rise in inflationary pressures, and Uruguay's GDP expanded by 10.4% for the first half of 2010. According to IMF estimates, Uruguay was probably to achieve growth in real GDP of between 8% and 8.5% in 2010, followed by 5% growth in 2011 and 4% in subsequent years. Gross public sector debt contracted in the second quarter of 2010, after five consecutive periods of sustained increase, reaching $21.885 billion US dollars, equivalent to 59.5% of the GDP.

Uruguay was ranked 68th in the Global Innovation Index in 2025. The number of union members has quadrupled since 2003, rising from 110,000 to more than 400,000 in 2015 for a working population of 1.5 million. According to the International Trade Union Confederation, Uruguay has "ratified all eight core ILO labour Conventions". The growth, use, and sale of cannabis were legalised on 11 December 2013, by former president José "Pepe" Mujica, making Uruguay the first country in the world to fully legalise marijuana. The law was voted on at the Uruguayan Senate on the same date with 16 votes to approve it and 13 against.

=== Agriculture ===
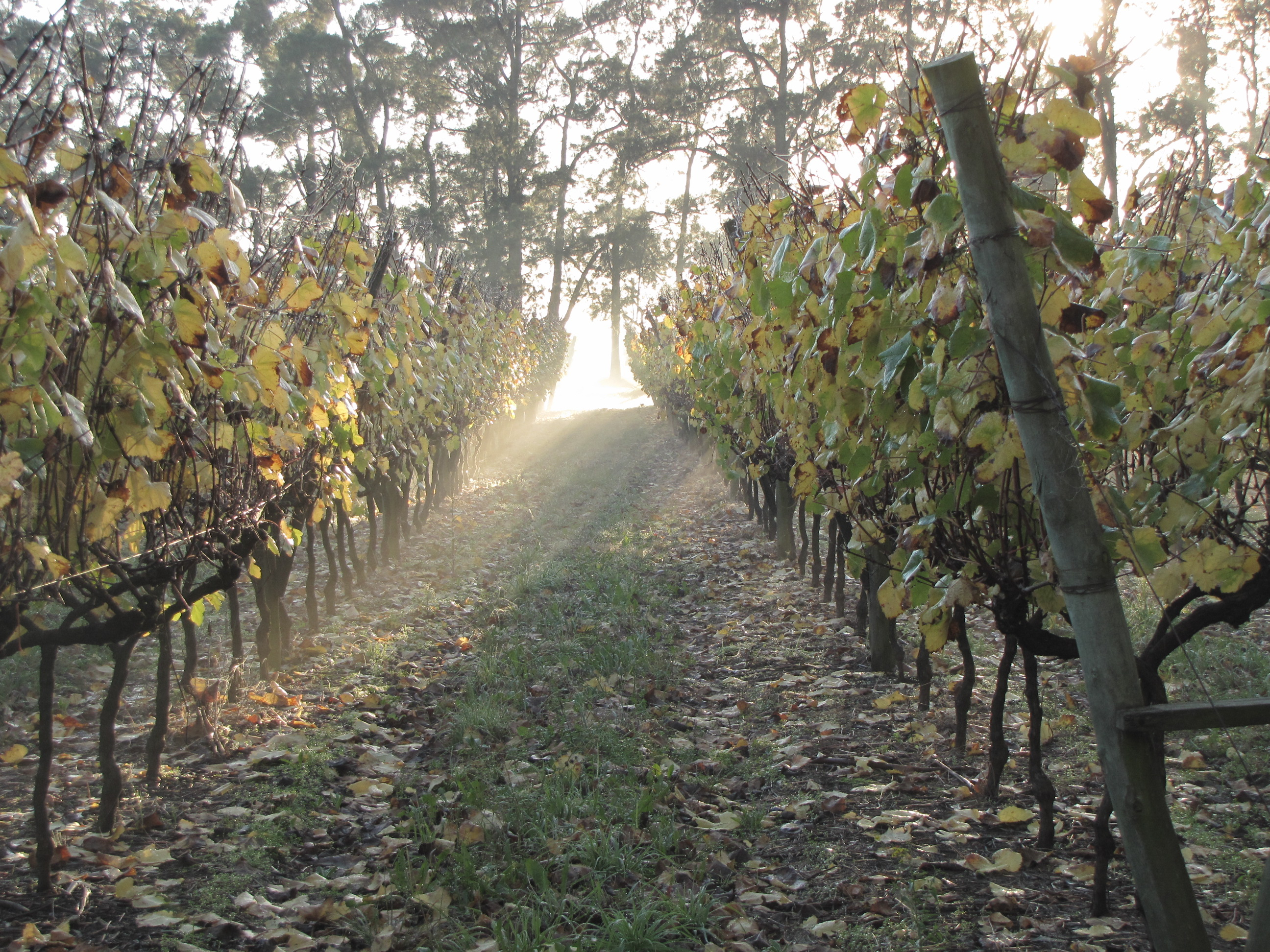
Vineyards in Uruguay

In 2010, Uruguay's export-oriented agricultural sector contributed to 9.3% of the GDP and employed 13% of the workforce. Official statistics from Uruguay's Agriculture and Livestock Ministry indicate that meat and sheep farming in Uruguay occupies 59.6% of the land. The percentage further increases to 82.4% when cattle breeding is linked to other farm activities such as dairy, forage, and rotation with crops such as rice.

According to FAOSTAT, Uruguay is one of the world's largest producers of soybeans (9th), wool (12th), horse meat (14th), beeswax (14th), and quinces (17th). Most farms (25,500 out of 39,120) are family-managed; beef and wool represent the main activities and main source of income for 65% of them, followed by vegetable farming at 12%, dairy farming at 11%, hogs at 2%, and poultry also at 2%. Beef is the main export commodity of the country, totalling over US$1 billion in 2006.

In 2007, Uruguay had cattle herds totalling 12 million head, making it the country with the highest number of cattle per capita at 3.8. However, 54% is in the hands of 11% of farmers, who have a minimum of 500 head. At the other extreme, 38% of farmers exploit small lots and have herds averaging below one hundred head.

=== Tourism ===
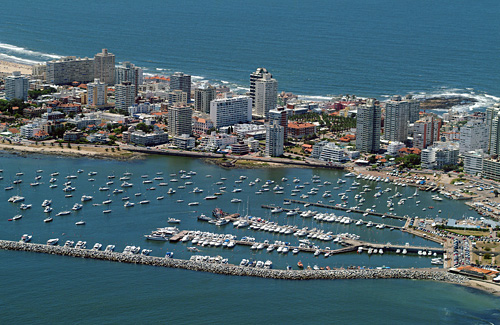
Punta del Este is one of the main tourist destinations in the Southern Cone.

Tourism is an important sector of Uruguay's economy. In 2012, it was estimated to account for 97,000 jobs and (directly and indirectly) 9% of GDP. Uruguay is the Latin American country that receives the most tourists in relation to its population. In 2023, 3.8 million tourists entered Uruguay, of which the majority were Argentines and Brazilians, followed by Chileans, Paraguayans, Americans and Europeans of various nationalities.

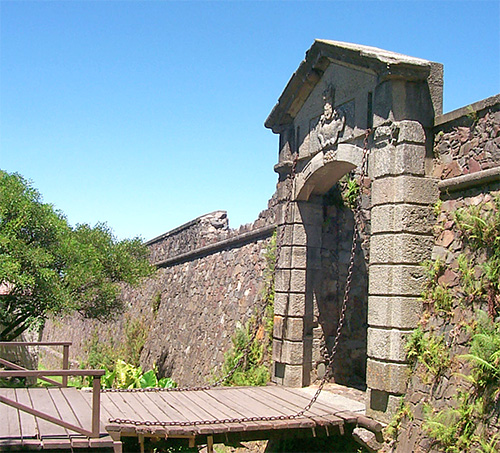
The old town of Colonia del Sacramento was declared as the first Uruguayan UNESCO World Heritage Site in 1995.

Cultural experiences in Uruguay include exploring the country's colonial heritage, as found in Colonia del Sacramento. Historical monuments include Torres García Museum and Estadio Centenario. One of the main natural attractions in Uruguay is Punta del Este, situated on a small peninsula off the southeast coast of Uruguay. Its beaches are divided into Mansa, or tame (river) side and Brava, or rugged (ocean) side. Punta del Este adjoins the city of Maldonado, while to its northeast along the coast are found the smaller resorts of La Barra and José Ignacio.

Another popular tourist attraction is Cabo Polonio, a seaside resort located in the municipality of Castillos, in the Rocha Department of Uruguay. This seaside resort is part of Cabo Polonio National Park. It lies a short distance from the resort town of Valizas and features three small islands off its coast, known as the Torres Islands: Isla Rasa, Isla Encantada, and El Islote.

=== Transportation ===
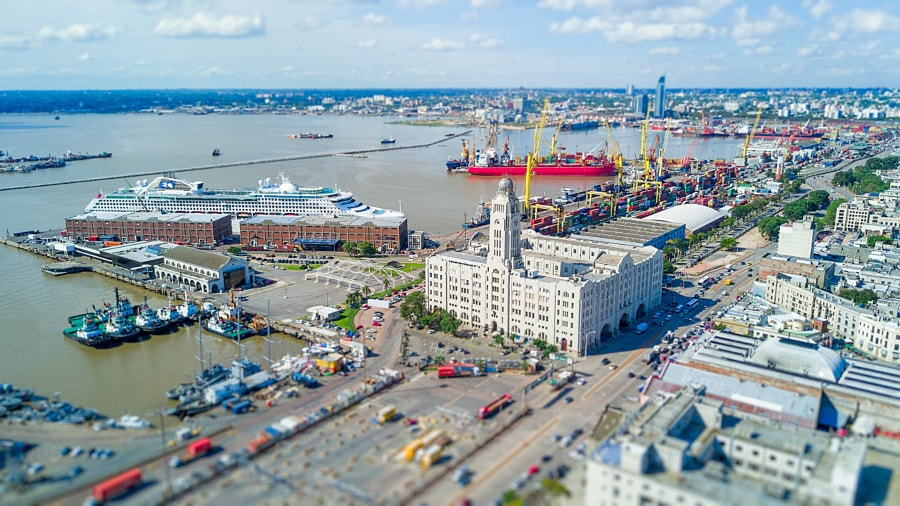
The Port of Montevideo, located at the mouth of the Río de la Plata Basin serves as a hub for high sea and inland navigation in the region.

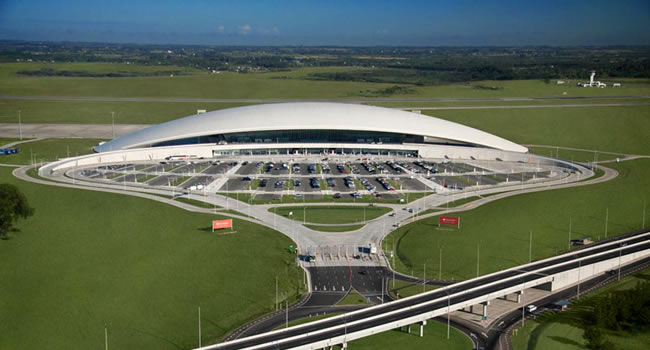
The Carrasco International Airport in Montevideo is the main airport of the country.

The Port of Montevideo is one of the major container terminal ports; it handles over 1.1 million containers annually. Its quay can handle 14-meter draft (46 ft) vessels. Nine straddle cranes allow for 80 to 100 movements per hour. The port of Nueva Palmira is a major regional merchandise transfer point and houses both private and government-run terminals.

==== Air ====
Carrasco International Airport was initially inaugurated in 1947, and in 2009, Puerta del Sur, the airport owner and operator, commissioned Rafael Viñoly Architects to expand and modernize the existing facilities with a spacious new passenger terminal with an investment of $165 million. The airport can handle up to 4.5 million users per year. PLUNA was the flag carrier of Uruguay and was headquartered in Carrasco.

The Punta del Este International Airport, located 15 kilometers (9.3 mi) from Punta del Este in the Maldonado Department, is the second busiest air terminal in Uruguay, built by the Uruguayan architect Carlos Ott. It was inaugurated in 1997.

==== Land ====
The Administración de Ferrocarriles del Estado is the autonomous agency in charge of rail transport and the maintenance of the railroad network. Uruguay has about 1,200 km (750 mi) of operational railroad track. Until 1947, about 90% of the railroad system was British-owned. In 1949, the government nationalised the railways, along with the electric trams and the Montevideo Waterworks Company. However, in 1985, the "National Transport Plan" suggested passenger trains were too costly to repair and maintain. Cargo trains would continue, but bus transportation became the "economic" alternative for travellers. Passenger service was then discontinued in 1988. However, rail passenger commuter service into Montevideo was restarted in 1993, and now comprises three suburban lines.

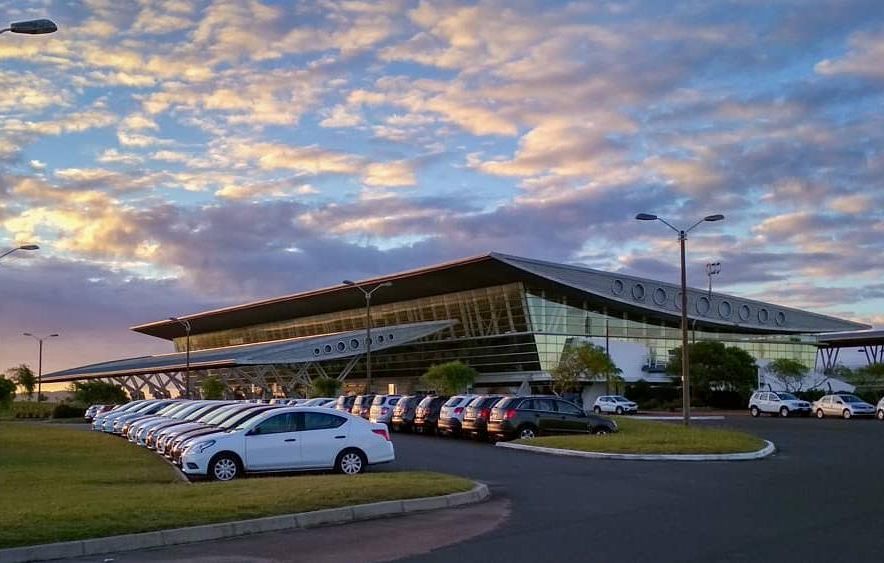
Punta del Este International Airport

Surfaced roads connect Montevideo to the other urban centres in the country, the main highways leading to the border and neighbouring cities. Numerous unpaved roads connect farms and small towns. Overland trade has increased markedly since Mercosur (Southern Common Market) was formed in the 1990s and again in the later 2000s. Most of the country's domestic freight and passenger service is by road rather than rail. The country has several international bus services connecting the capital and frontier localities to neighbouring countries. These include 17 destinations in Argentina, (Note: Namely Bell Ville, Buenos Aires, Concepción del Uruguay, Concordia, Entre Ríos, Córdoba, Gualeguaychú, Mendoza, Paraná, Rio Cuarto, Rosario, San Francisco, San Luis, Santa Fe, Tigre, Venado Tuerto, Villa María, and Villa Mercedes) 12 destinations in Brazil, (Note: Namely Camboriú, Curitiba, Florianópolis, Jaguarão, Joinville, Pelotas, Porto Alegre, Quaraí, São Gabriel, São Paulo, Santa Maria, and Santana do Livramento (Santana do Livramento has open borders with the Uruguayan city of Rivera. There are no physical barriers or immigration checkpoints inhibiting movement between or within the two contiguous cities, despite each one belonging to separate national jurisdictions.)) and the capital cities of Chile and Paraguay.

=== Telecommunications ===
The telecommunications industry is more developed than in most other Latin American countries, being the first country in the Americas to achieve complete digital telephone coverage in 1997. The system is government-owned, and there have been controversial proposals to partially privatise it since the 1990s.

The mobile phone market is shared by the state-owned ANTEL and two private companies, Movistar and Claro. ANTEL has the largest market share at 49% of Uruguay's mobile lines. ANTEL has launched a commercial 5G network in April 2019 with still continual development. Movistar and Claro have 30% and 21% market share, respectively. The Google Search engine accounted for 95% of total search engine market share in 2023–2024.

=== Energy ===
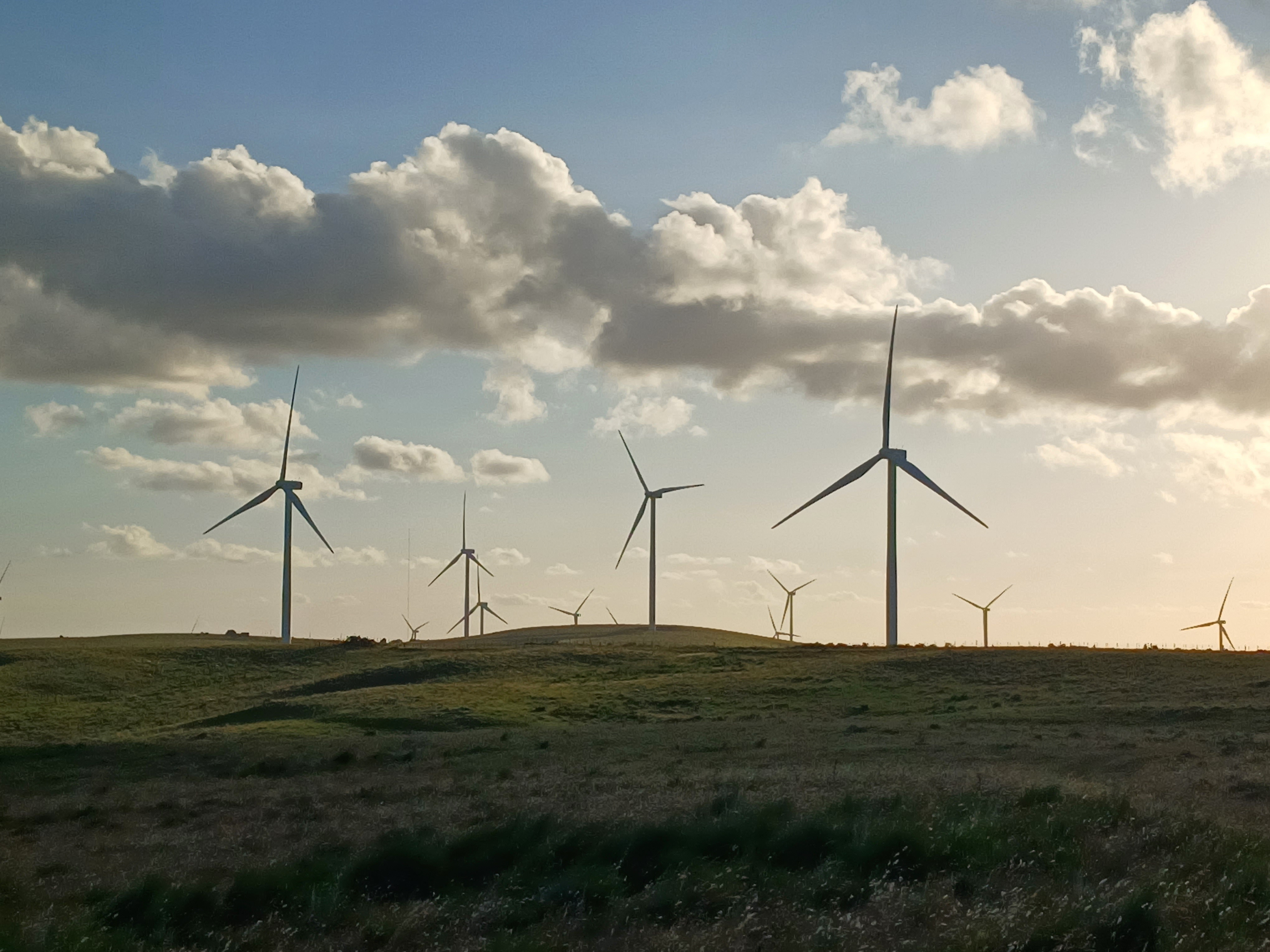
Wind power rapidly grew from 1% of Uruguay's electricity mix in 2013 to 34% in 2018.

In 2010, the Ministry of Energy, Mining and Industry of Uruguay approved Decree 354 on the Promotion of Renewable Energies. In 2021, Uruguay had, in terms of installed renewable electricity, 1,538 MW in hydropower, 1,514 MW in wind power (35th largest in the world), 258 MW in solar power (66th largest in the world), and 423 MW in biomass. In 2023, 98% of Uruguay's electricity comes from renewable energy. The dramatic shift, taking less than ten years and without government funding, lowered electricity costs and slashed the country's carbon footprint. Most of the electricity comes from hydroelectric facilities and wind parks. Uruguay no longer imports electricity. In 2022, 49% of the country's total carbon dioxide emissions came from the burning of diesel fuel, followed by gasoline, with a 25% share.

== Demographics ==
Racial groups in Uruguay (2023 census)
	Percent
Whites	86.0%
Blacks	10.4%
Indigenous	6.3%
East Asians	0.7%
Other/none	6.3%
Results are more than 100% due to choosing more than one ancestry.

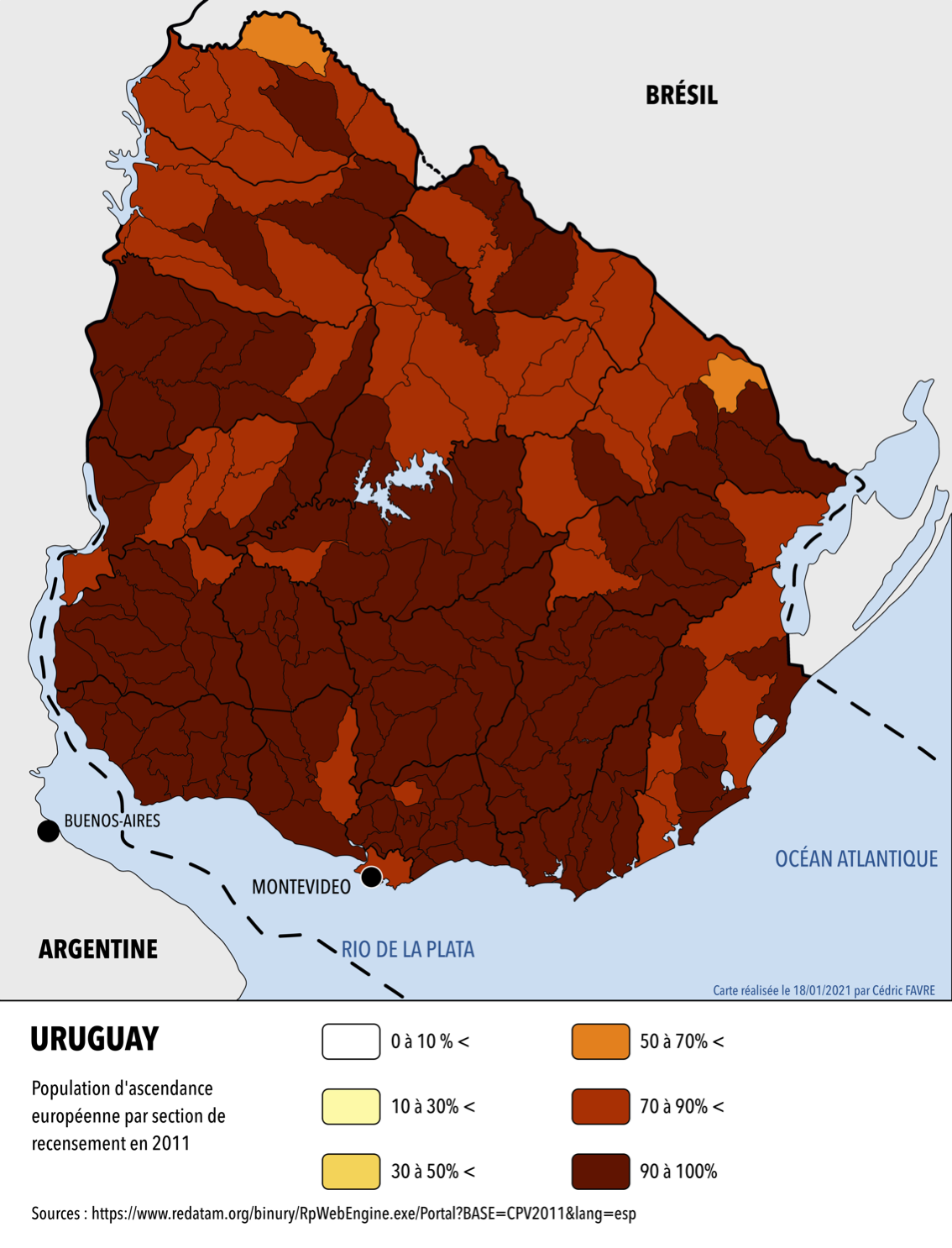
Distribution of White people.

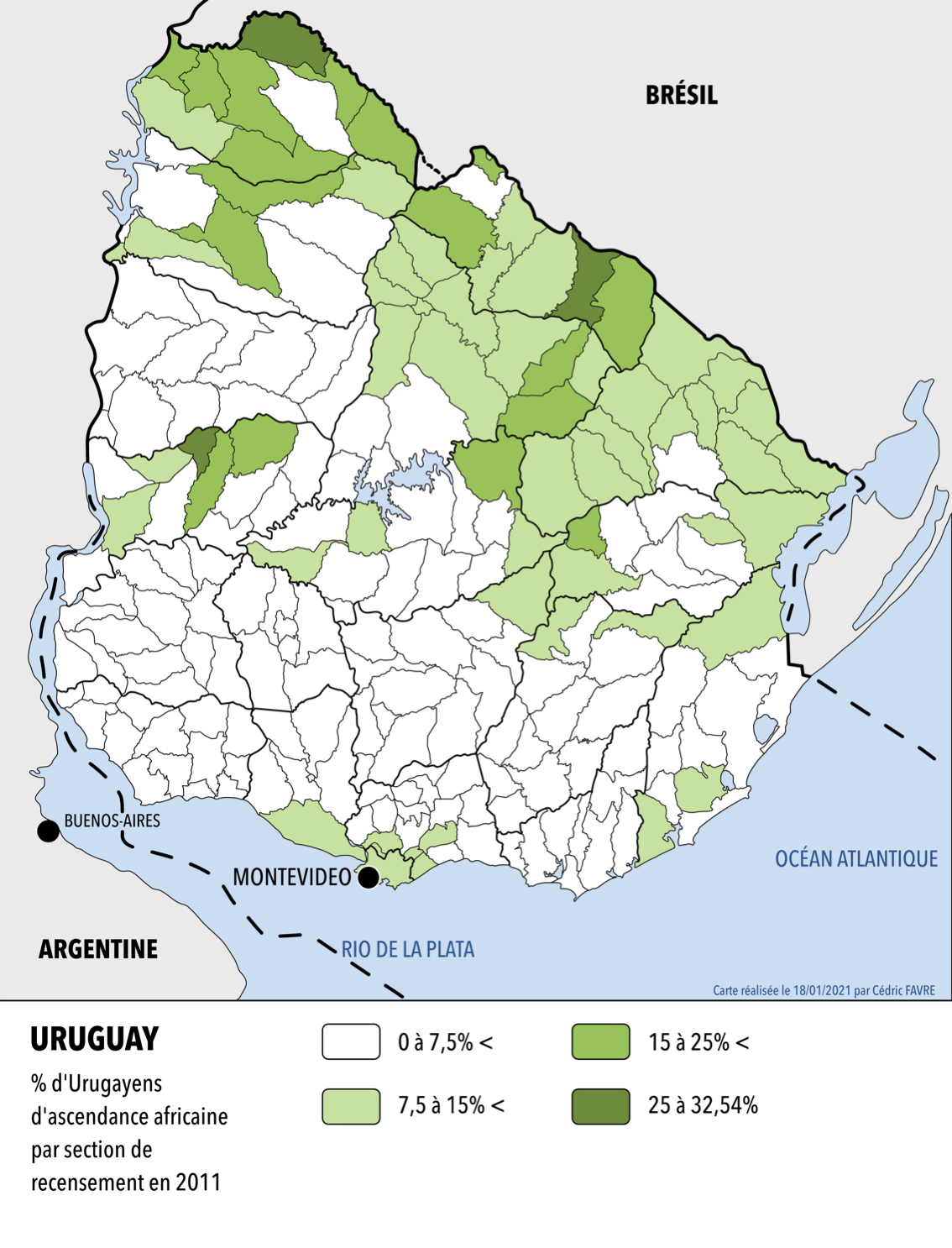
Distribution of Black people.

Uruguayans are of predominantly European origin, with 86.0% of the population claiming "white" as their dominant ancestry self-identified in the 2023 census, a decrease from 87.7% over the 2011 census. Most Uruguayans of European ancestry are descendants of 19th and 20th century immigrants from Spain and Italy, and to a lesser degree France, Germany, and Britain. Earlier settlers had migrated from Argentina. People of African descent make up around ten per cent of the total population. There are also important communities of Japanese descent. Overall, the ethnic composition is similar to neighbouring Argentine provinces as well as Southern Brazil.

From 1963 to 1985, an estimated 320,000 Uruguayans emigrated. The most popular destinations for Uruguayan emigrants are Argentina, followed by the United States, Australia, Canada, Spain, Brazil, Italy, France and Portugal. In 2009, for the first time in 44 years, the country saw an overall positive influx when comparing immigration to emigration. 3,825 residence permits were awarded in 2009, compared with 1,216 in 2005. 50% of new legal residents come from Argentina and Brazil. A migration law passed in 2008 gives immigrants the same rights and opportunities that nationals have, with the requisite of proving a monthly income of $650.

Metropolitan Montevideo is the only large city, with around 1.9 million inhabitants, or more than half the country's total population. The rest of the urban population lives in about 30 towns. Uruguay's rate of population growth is much lower than in other Latin American countries. Its median age is 35.3 years, higher than the global average due to its low birth rate, high life expectancy, and relatively high rate of emigration among younger people. A quarter of the population is less than 15 years old, and about a sixth are aged 60 and older. In 2017, the average total fertility rate (TFR) across Uruguay was 1.70 children born per woman, below the replacement rate of 2.1. It remains considerably below the high of 5.76 children born per woman in 1882. A 2017 IADB report on labour conditions for Latin American nations ranked Uruguay as the region's leader overall in all but one subindexes, including gender, age, income, formality, and labour participation.

=== Largest cities ===
Largest cities or towns in Uruguay "Uruguay". citypopulation.de.
Rank	Name	Department	Pop.	Rank	Name	Department	Pop.
1	Montevideo	Montevideo	1,304,687	11	Artigas	Artigas	40,657
2	Salto	Salto	104,011	12	Minas	Lavalleja	38,446
3	Ciudad de la Costa	Canelones	95,176	13	San José de Mayo	San José	36,743
4	Paysandú	Paysandú	76,412	14	Durazno	Durazno	34,368
5	Las Piedras	Canelones	71,258	15	Florida	Florida	33,639
6	Rivera	Rivera	64,465	16	Barros Blancos	Canelones	31,650
7	Maldonado	Maldonado	62,590	17	Ciudad del Plata	San José	31,145
8	Tacuarembó	Tacuarembó	54,755	18	San Carlos	Maldonado	27,471
9	Melo	Cerro Largo	51,830	19	Colonia del Sacramento	Colonia	26,231
10	Mercedes	Soriano	41,974	20	Pando	Canelones	25,947

=== Language ===
Spanish is the de facto national language. Uruguayan Spanish, as a variant of Rioplatense, employs both voseo and yeísmo (with [ʃ] or [ʒ]) and has a great influence of the Italian language and its different dialects since it incorporates lunfardo. In the border areas with Brazil in the northeast of the country, Uruguayan Portuguese is spoken, which consists of a mixture of Spanish with Brazilian Portuguese. It is a dialect without formally defined orthography and without any official recognition.

English is the most widely known foreign language among the Uruguayan people. French and Italian have also historically been present in the country, owing to immigration and their inclusion as compulsory subjects in the school curriculum until the 2000s. No Indigenous languages are known to remain in active use in Uruguay. Historically, Guaraní and Chaná were spoken in some parts of the country, particularly in rural areas, but are no longer spoken.

In 2001, Uruguayan Sign Language (LSU) was recognised as an official language of Uruguay under Law 17.378.

=== Religion ===
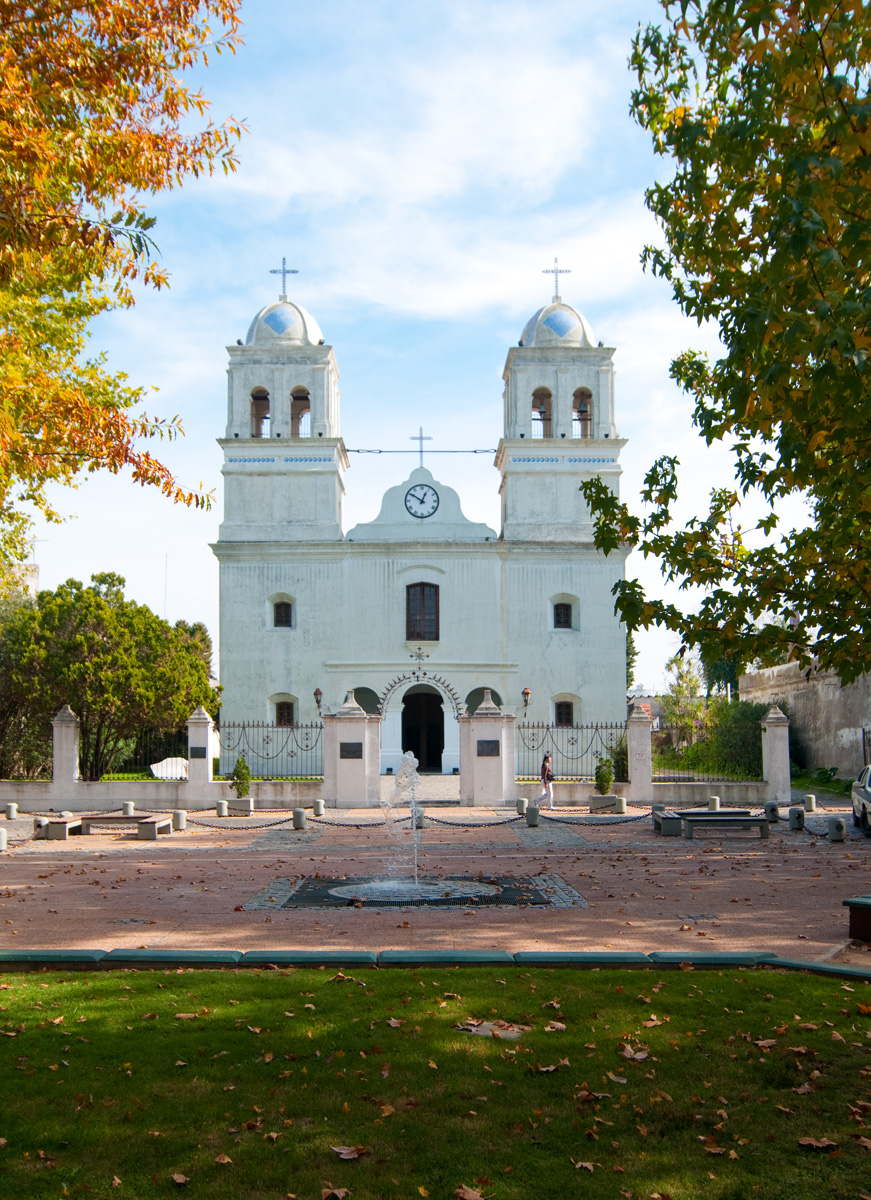
The Church of Saint Charles Borromeo in San Carlos is one of the oldest churches in Uruguay.

Uruguay is a secular country where freedom of religion is constitutionally guaranteed. It is often considered the most secular country in the Americas. Secularisation began during the colonial period, when the Catholic Church wielded less influence than in other parts of the Spanish Empire, partly owing to the region's small Indigenous population and the limited success of missionary efforts. Following independence, anticlericalism, influenced in part by French ideas of laïcité, further eroded the Church's influence, culminating in the separation of church and state under the 1918 Constitution.

Christianity is the largest religion in Uruguay, with Catholicism as its largest branch, followed by approximately 33–38% of the population. However, around 47% of Uruguayans identify as nonreligious, one of the highest proportions in the Americas. Protestantism, including Evangelical, Methodist, Lutheran and Anglican churches, represents approximately 9–12% of the population. Judaism is practised by around 0.4% of Uruguayans, and the country is home to the fourth-largest Jewish community in South America. Other minority religious traditions include animism and Umbanda, an Afro-Brazilian religion. Within Montevideo's sizeable Armenian community, the predominant Christian tradition is the Armenian Apostolic Church.

=== Education ===
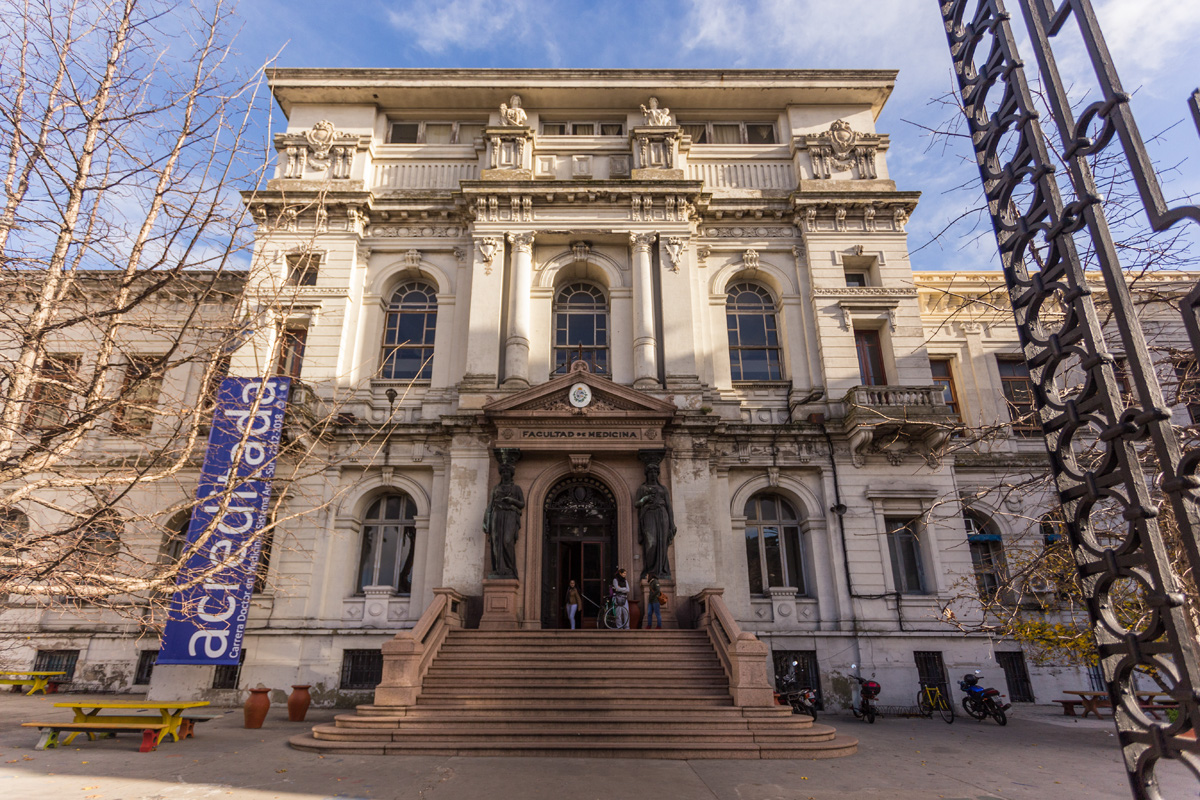
Faculty of Medicine of the University of the Republic, founded 1849

Education in Uruguay is secular, free, and compulsory for 14 years, starting at the age of 4. The system is divided into six levels of education: early childhood (3–5 years), primary (6–11 years), basic secondary (12–14 years), upper secondary (15–17 years), higher education (18 and up), and postgraduate education. Public education is managed by three main institutions: the Ministry of Education and Culture, which coordinates national policies; the National Administration of Public Education, responsible for early childhood through secondary education; and the University of the Republic, which oversees higher education as the nation's leading institution.

The country maintains an adult literacy rate approaching 100% and ranks high at the regional level in standardized assessments, including PISA. In 2023, the government invested 4.9% of GDP in education.

Uruguay is part of the One Laptop per Child project, and in 2009 it became the first country in the world to provide a laptop for every primary school student as part of the Plan Ceibal. Over the 2007–2009 period, 362,000 pupils and 18,000 teachers were involved in the scheme; around 70% of the laptops were given to children who did not have computers at home. The OLPC project represents less than 5% of the country's education budget.

== Culture ==
Uruguayan culture is predominantly European. The tradition of the gaucho has been an important element in the art and folklore of both Uruguay and Argentina.

=== Visual arts ===
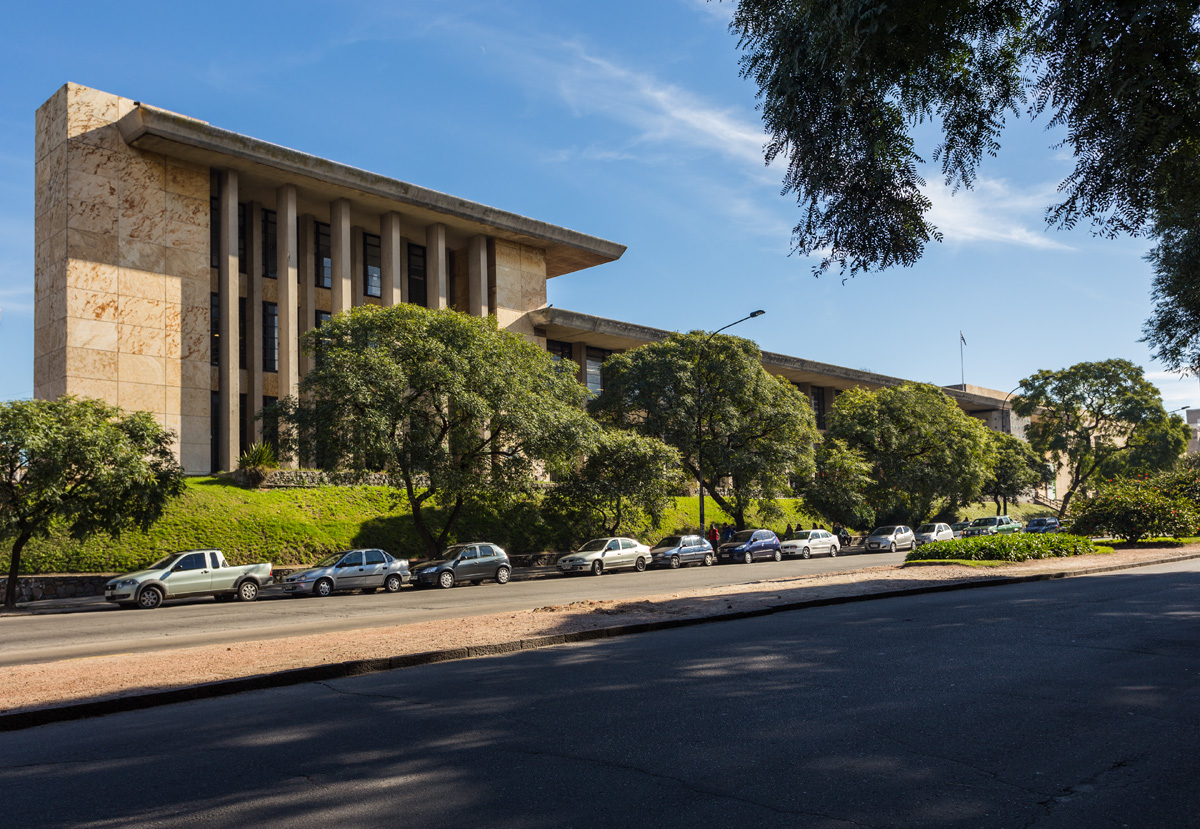
The School of Architecture in Montevideo

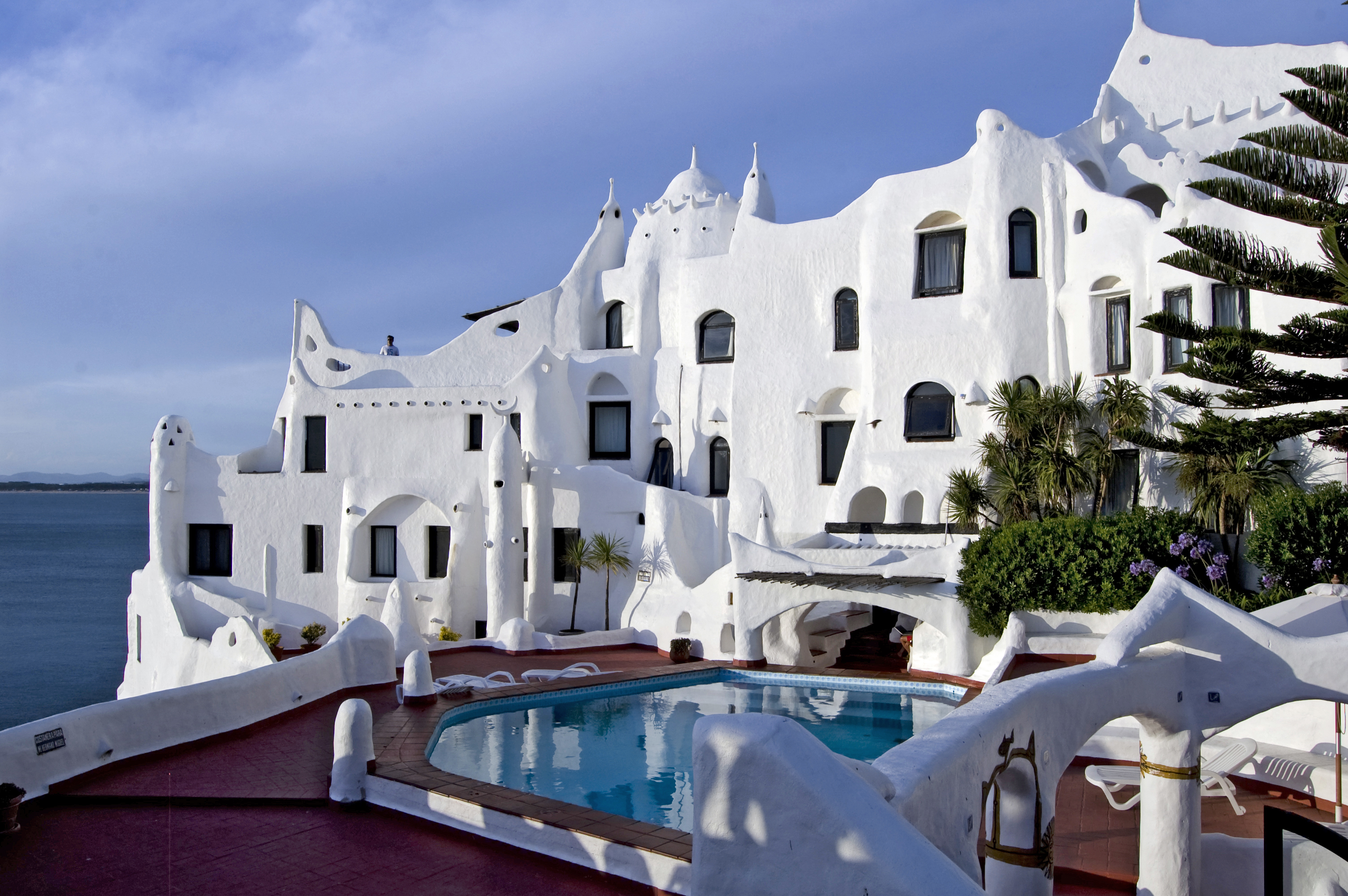
A "livable sculpture", Carlos Páez Vilaró's Casapueblo was his home, hotel and museum.

Abstract painter and sculptor Carlos Páez Vilaró was a prominent Uruguayan artist. He drew from both Timbuktu and Mykonos to create his best-known work: his home, hotel and atelier Casapueblo near Punta del Este. The 19th-century painter Juan Manuel Blanes, whose works depict historical events, was the first Uruguayan artist to gain widespread recognition. The Post-Impressionist painter Pedro Figari did pastel studies in Montevideo and the countryside. Most of the paintings were part of the abstract trend, not muralism.

Uruguay has many art museums, most of which are in Montevideo, such as the Torres García Museum and the Gurvich Museum. The Torres García Museum was dedicated in honour of the Uruguayan artist Joaquín Torres-García.

=== Music ===
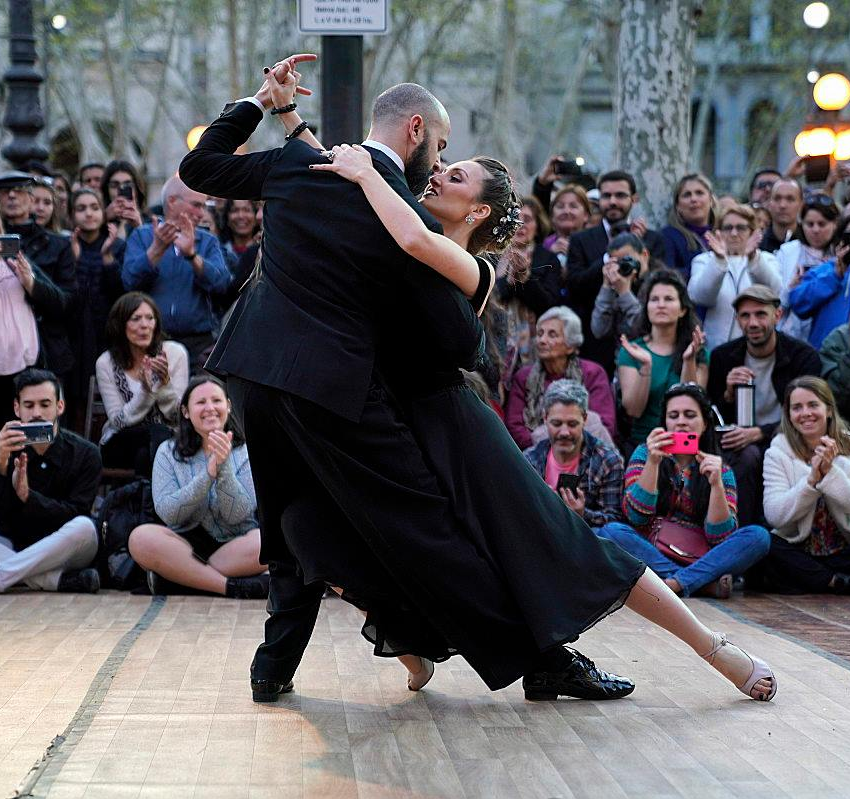
Tango dancers in Montevideo

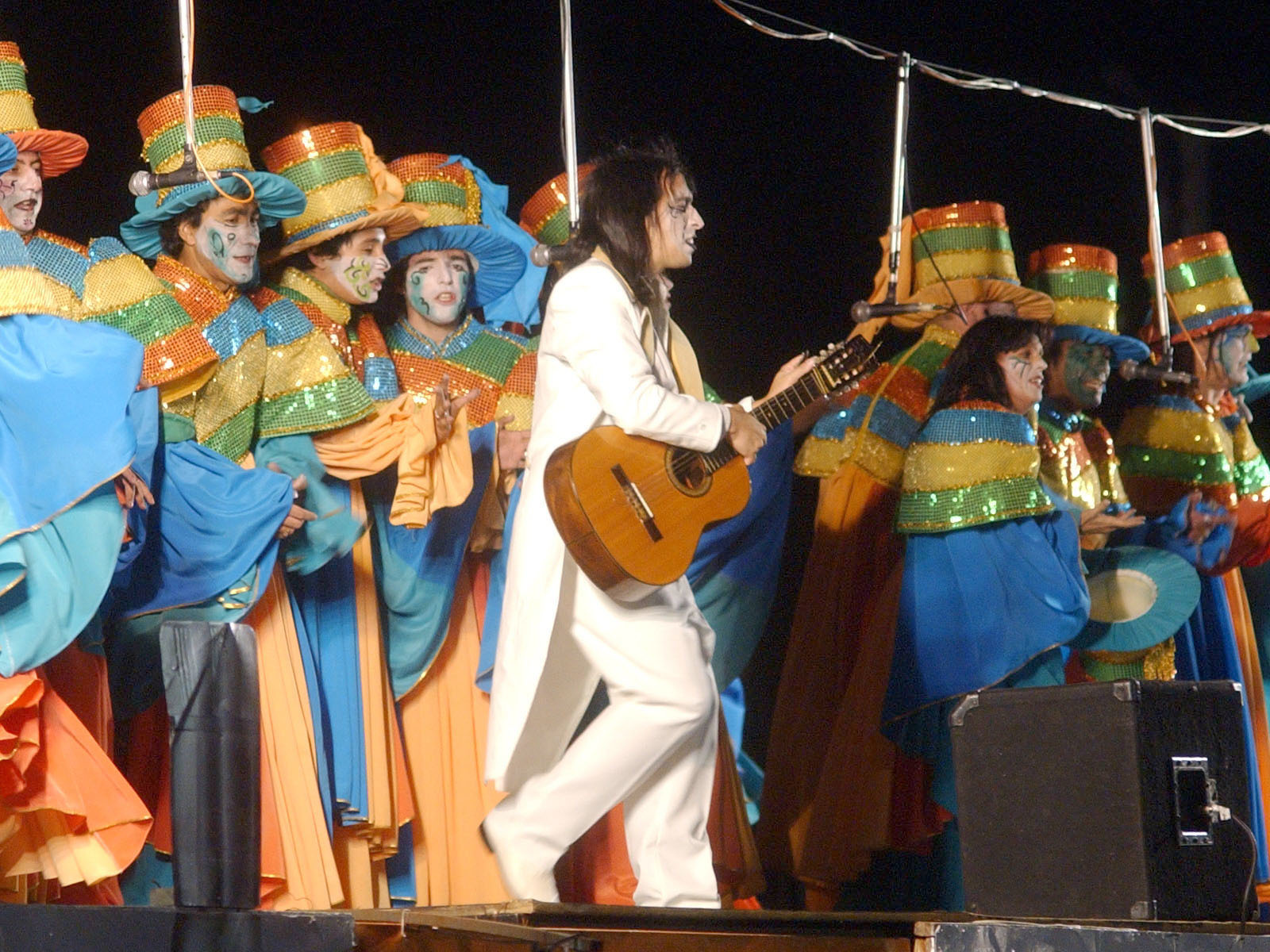
Murga singers at the Carnival

The folk and popular music of Uruguay shares its gaucho roots with Argentina and the tango. One of the most famous tangos, "La cumparsita" (1917), was written by the Uruguayan composer Gerardo Matos Rodríguez. The candombe is a folk dance performed at Carnival, especially Uruguayan Carnival, mainly by Uruguayans of African ancestry. The guitar is the preferred musical instrument, and in a popular traditional contest called the payada, two singers, each with a guitar, take turns improvising verses to the same tune. Folk music is called canto popular and includes some guitar players and singers such as Los Olimareños, and Numa Moraes.

There are numerous radio stations and musical events of rock music and the Caribbean genres. Early classical music in Uruguay showed Spanish and Italian influence, but since the 20th century, a number of composers of classical music, including Eduardo Fabini, Héctor Tosar, and Eduardo Gilardoni, have made use of Latin American musical idioms more. There are two symphony orchestras in Montevideo, OSSODRE and Filarmonica de Montevideo. Some of the well-known classical musicians are pianists Albert Enrique Graf; guitarists Eduardo Fernandez and Marco Sartor; and singers Erwin Schrott.

Tango has especially affected Uruguayan culture during the 20th century, particularly the 1930s and 1940s with Uruguayan singers such as Julio Sosa from Las Piedras. When tango singer Carlos Gardel was 29 years old, he changed his nationality to be Uruguayan, saying he was born in Tacuarembó. Nevertheless, a Carlos Gardel museum was established in 1999 in Valle Edén, near Tacuarembó.

Rock and roll was first introduced into Uruguay with the arrival of the Beatles and other British bands in the early 1960s. A wave of bands appeared in Montevideo, including Los Shakers, Los Iracundos, Los Moonlights, and Los Malditos, of which all became major figures in the so-called Uruguayan Invasion of Argentina. Popular Uruguayan rock bands include La Vela Puerca, El Cuarteto de Nos, and Cursi. In 2004, the Uruguayan musician and actor Jorge Drexler won an Academy Award for composing the song "Al otro lado del río" from the movie The Motorcycle Diaries, which narrated the life of Che Guevara.

=== Literature ===
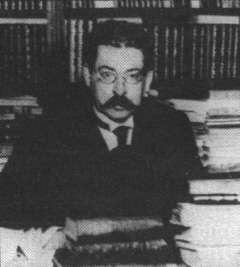
José Enrique Rodó

José Enrique Rodó (1871–1917), a modernist, is considered Uruguay's most significant literary figure. His book, Ariel (1900), deals with the need to maintain spiritual values while pursuing material and technical progress. It also stresses resisting cultural dominance by Europe and the United States. Notable amongst Latin American playwrights is Florencio Sánchez (1875–1910), who wrote plays about contemporary social problems that are still performed today.

From about the same period came the romantic poetry of Juan Zorrilla de San Martín (1855–1931), who wrote epic poems about Uruguayan history. Also notable are Juana de Ibarbourou (1892–1979), Delmira Agustini (1886–1914), Idea Vilariño (1920–2009), and the short stories of Horacio Quiroga and Juan José Morosoli (1899–1959). The psychological stories of Juan Carlos Onetti (such as "No Man's Land" and "The Shipyard") have earned widespread critical praise, as have the writings of Mario Benedetti.

Uruguay's best-known contemporary writer is Eduardo Galeano, author of Las venas abiertas de América Latina (1971; "Open Veins of Latin America") and the trilogy Memoria del fuego (1982–87; "Memory of Fire"). Other modern Uruguayan writers include Sylvia Lago, Jorge Majfud, and Jesús Moraes.

=== Media ===
The Reporters Without Borders worldwide press freedom index has ranked Uruguay as 19th of 180 reported countries in 2019. Freedom of speech and media are guaranteed by the constitution, with qualifications for inciting violence or "insulting the nation". Uruguay's freedom of the press was severely curtailed during the years of military dictatorship. On his first day in office in March 1985, Sanguinetti reestablished complete freedom of the press. Consequently, Montevideo's newspapers expanded their circulations. Uruguayans have access to more than 100 private daily and weekly newspapers, more than 100 radio stations, and some 20 terrestrial television channels, and cable TV is widely available.

State-run radio and TV are operated by the official broadcasting service SODRE. Some newspapers are owned by, or linked to, the main political parties. El Día was the nation's most prestigious paper until its demise in the early 1990s, founded in 1886 by the Colorado party leader and (later) president José Batlle y Ordóñez. El País, the paper of the rival Blanco Party, has the largest circulation. Búsqueda serves as a forum for political and economic analysis. Although it sells only about 16,000 copies a week, its estimated readership exceeds 50,000.

=== Cuisine ===
Uruguayan cuisine reflects the country's history of immigration, particularly from Spain and Italy, and to a lesser extent from England, France, and Germany, among others. Pasta, pizza, seafood, pastries, and other dishes of European origin are widely incorporated into the national cuisine, while beef occupies a central place in traditional meals.

Among the best known dishes are asado and the chivito. Asado consists of meat cooked over a grill or open fire and is an important social tradition in Uruguay. The chivito is a sandwich generally containing thin grilled beef and toppings such as lettuce, tomatoes, fried egg, ham, and olives. Other commonly eaten dishes include milanesa, a kind of fried breaded meat cutlet, and a variety of pastas reflecting Italian cultural influence.

One of the most consumed spreads in Uruguay is dulce de leche (a caramel confection from Latin America prepared by slowly heating sugar and milk). The most typical sweet is alfajor, which is a small cake, filled with dulce de leche and covered with chocolate or meringue. Other typical desserts include the pastafrola (a type of cake filled with quince jelly) and chajá (meringue, sponge cake, whipped cream and fruits, typically peaches and strawberries are added). Mate, an herbal drink, is the most typical beverage in Uruguay.

=== Sports ===
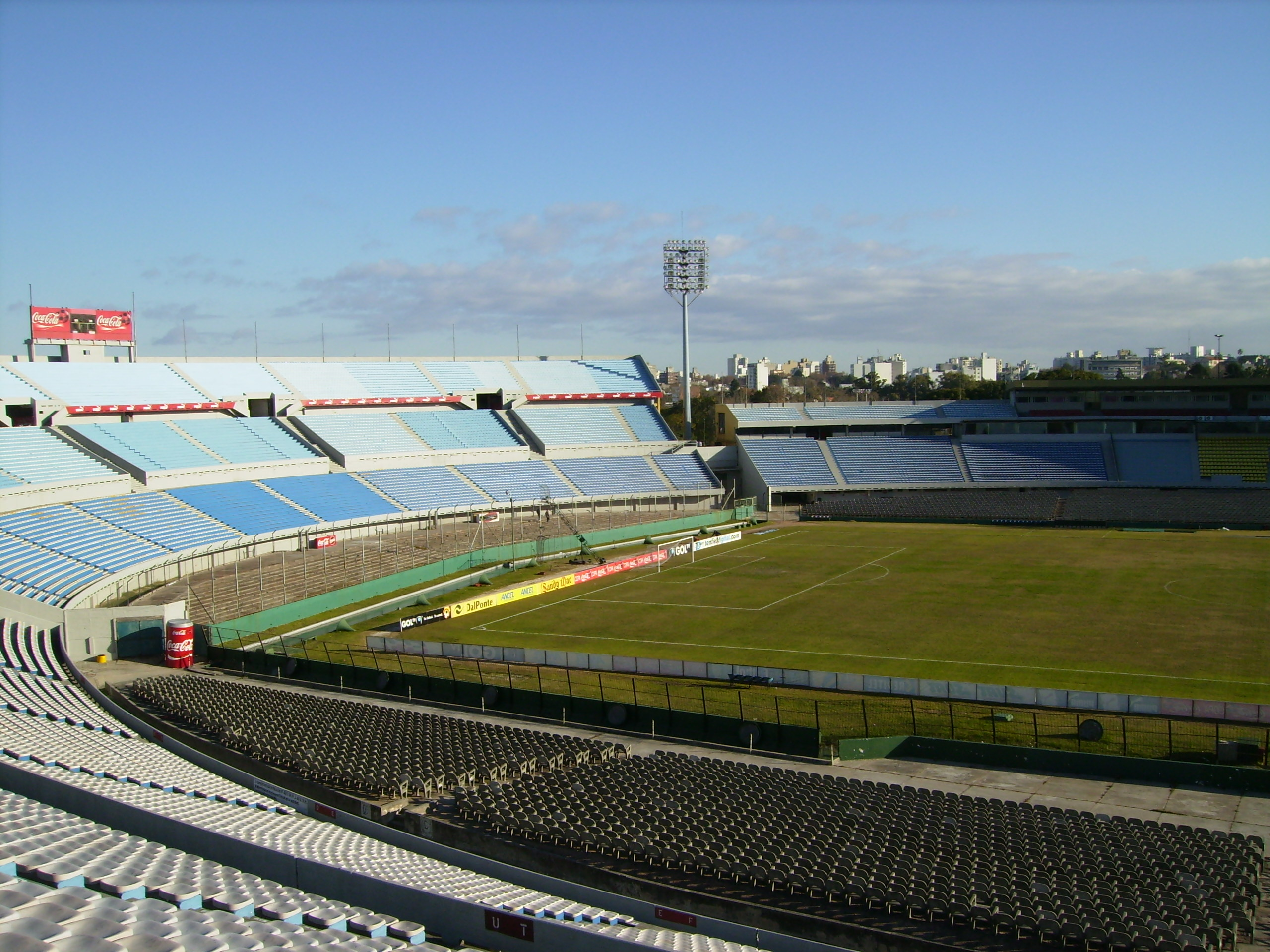
Centenario Stadium

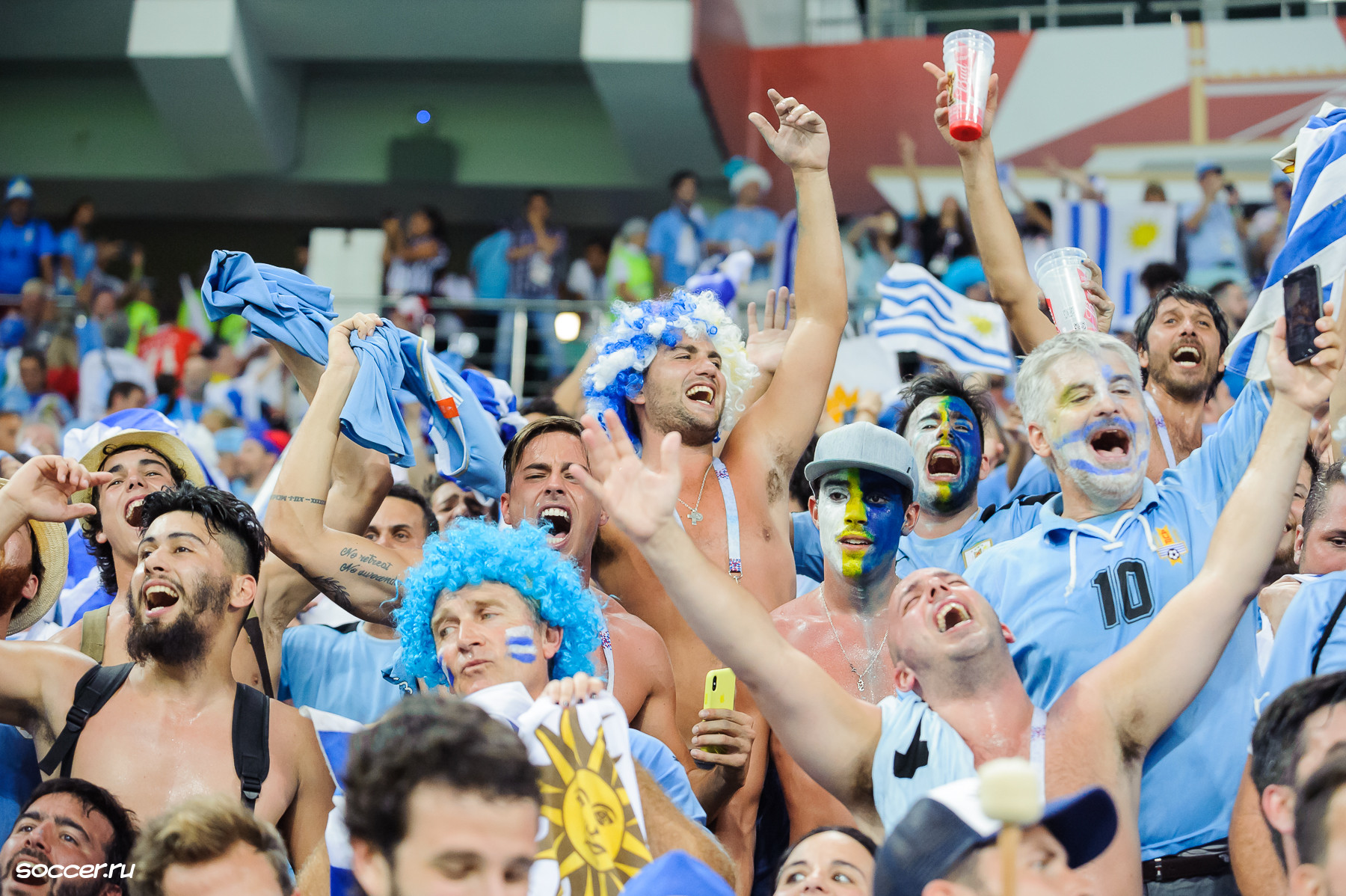
Uruguay supporters at the 2018 FIFA World Cup in Russia

Association football (Spanish: fútbol) is the most popular sport in Uruguay. The first international match outside the British Isles was played between Uruguay and Argentina in Montevideo in July 1902. Football was introduced to Uruguay by English sailors and workers in the 19th century alongside rugby and cricket. Uruguay won gold at the 1924 Paris Olympic Games and again in 1928 in Amsterdam. Its national football team has won the FIFA World Cup on two occasions. Uruguay won the inaugural tournament on home soil in 1930 and again in 1950, famously defeating home favourites Brazil in the final match. Uruguay has won the Copa América (an international tournament for South American nations and guests) 15 times, one less than Argentina, the last one in 2011. Uruguay has by far the smallest population of any country that has won a World Cup. Despite their early success, they missed three World Cups in four attempts from 1994 to 2006. Uruguay reached the semifinal for the first time in 40 years in the 2010 FIFA World Cup. Diego Forlán was presented with the Golden Ball award as the best player of the 2010 tournament. Uruguay exported 1,414 football players during the 2000s, almost as many players as Brazil and Argentina. In 2010, the Uruguayan government enacted measures intended to retain players in the country. There are two Montevideo-based football clubs, Nacional and Peñarol; they have won three Intercontinental Cups each. When the two clubs play each other, it is known as Uruguayan Clásico. As of the latest FIFA Men's World Rankings released on July 2026, Uruguay is ranked 20th in the world. Their highest-ever FIFA ranking remains 2nd, achieved in June 2012, when they finished behind Spain.

Another popular sport is basketball. Its national team qualified for the Basketball World Cup seven times, more often than other countries in South America, except Brazil and Argentina. Uruguay hosted the official Basketball World Cup for the 1967 FIBA World Championship and the official Americas Basketball Championship in 1988 and 1997, and was a host of the 2017 FIBA AmeriCup.

== See also ==
- Outline of Uruguay
