= List of divided cities =

A divided city is one which, as a consequence of political changes or border shifts, currently constitutes (or once constituted) two separate entities, or an urban area with a border running through it. Listed below are the localities and the state they belonged to at the time of division.

Especially notable examples of divided cities are divided capitals, including Nicosia (since 1974), Jerusalem (1948–1967; de jure ongoing since 1948), Berlin (1949–1990) and Beirut (1975–1990).

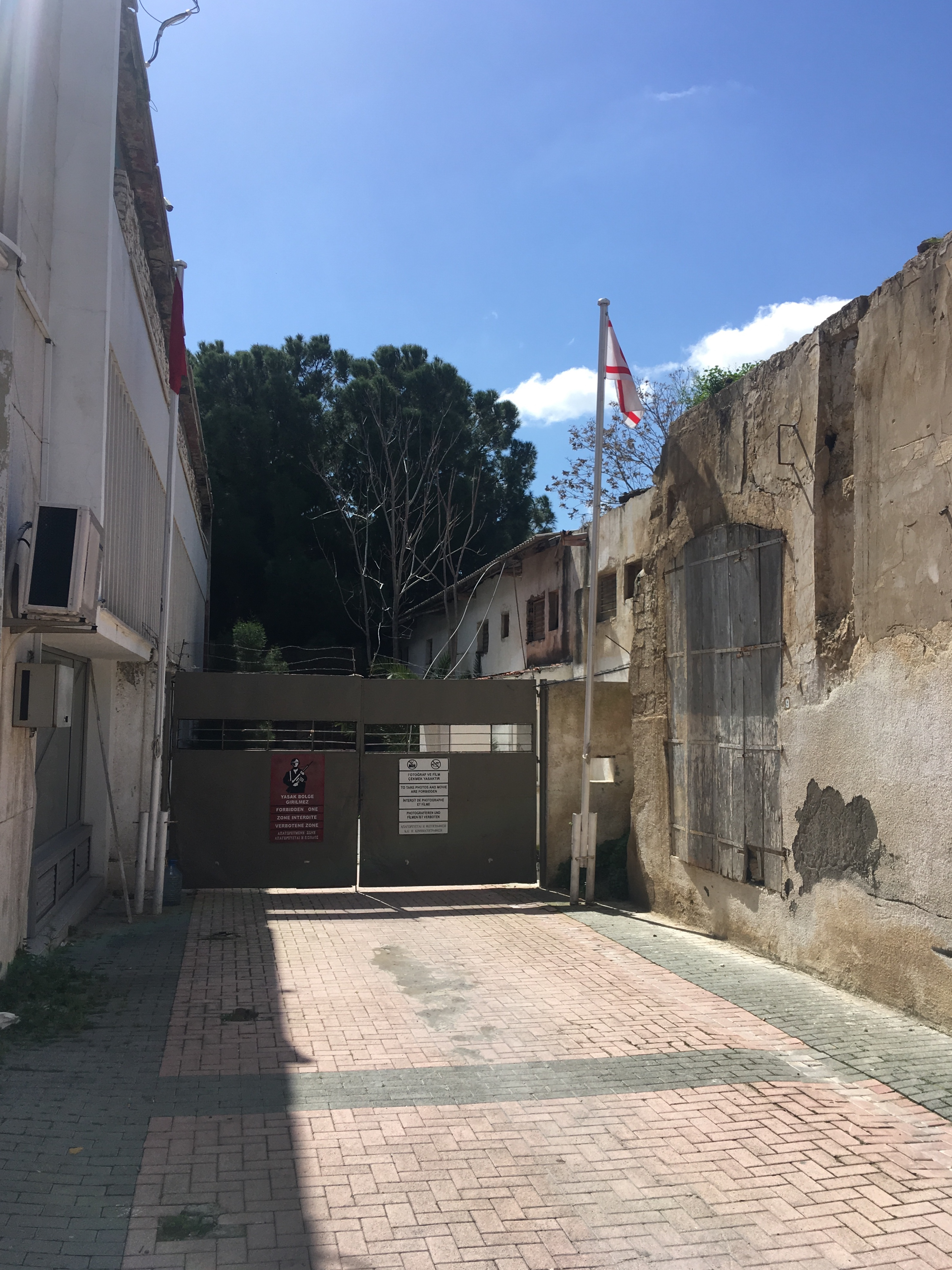
Border wall in Nicosia

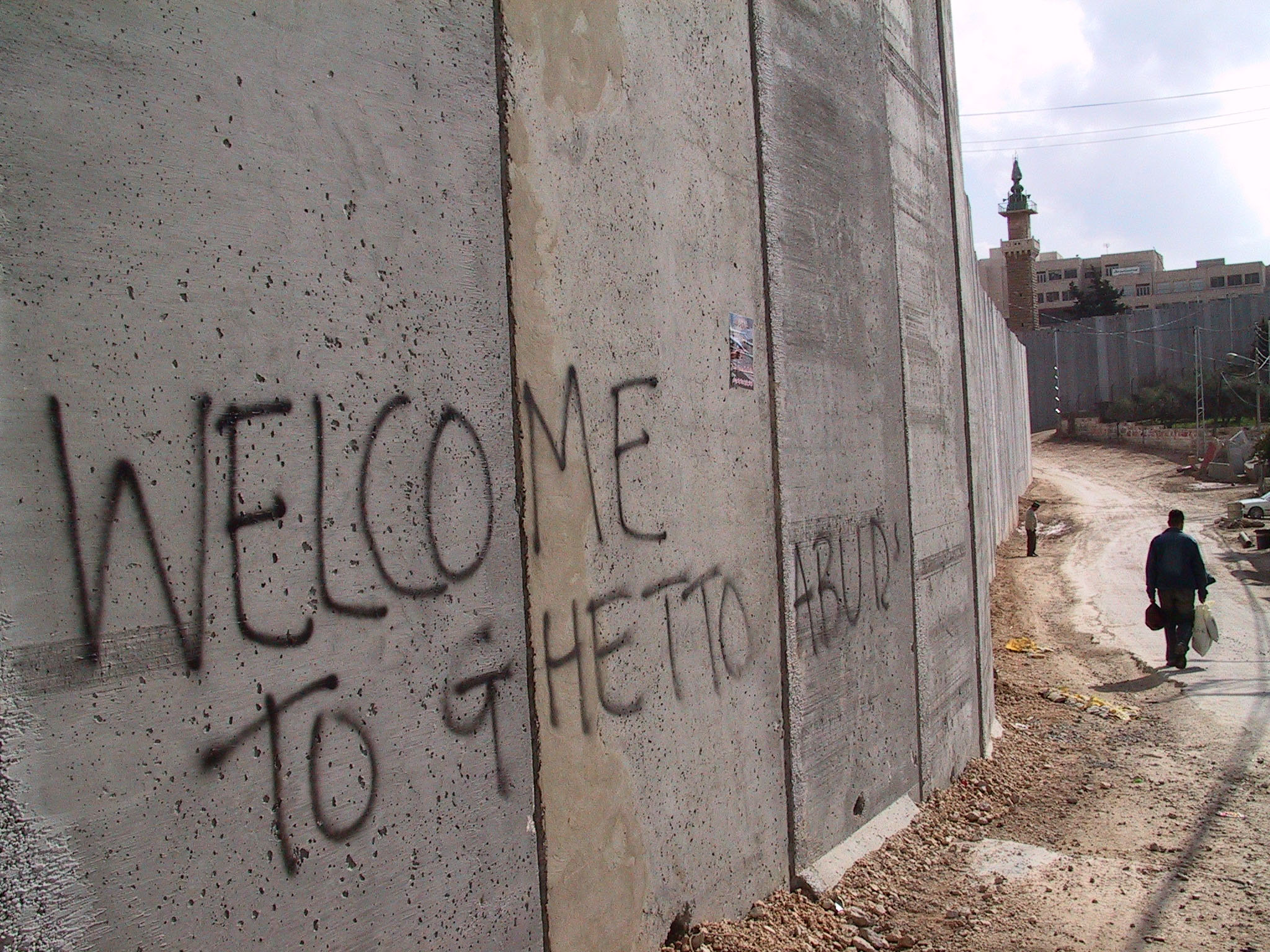
West Bank barrier in Jerusalem

== Former cities now divided ==
=== Africa ===
Joint	Parts	
Galkayo, Somalia	North Galkayo (administered by Puntland)	South Galkayo (administered by Galmudug)
Moyale, divided between Kenya and Ethiopia		

=== Americas ===
Joint	Parts	
Bristol, U.S.	Bristol, Tennessee	Bristol, Virginia
Carmen de Patagones, Argentina	Carmen de Patagones, Buenos Aires Province	Viedma, Río Negro Province
El Paso del Norte, Mexico (divided in 1848 after the Mexican–American War)	El Paso, Texas, United States	Ciudad Juárez, Mexico
Laredo, New Spain/Mexico	Laredo, Texas	Nuevo Laredo, Tamaulipas (The Mexican city was founded when the border was established, by people moving over the border from what had just become the US city)
Lloydminster, Canada, divided between Alberta and Saskatchewan, 1905–1930. The community was founded in 1903 in what was then the Northwest Territories, and located on the Fourth Meridian of the Dominion Land Survey, which became the boundary between the newly created provinces two years later. In 1930, the community was reunited as a single town under the shared jurisdiction of both provinces, and reincorporated as a single city in 1958.
Nogales	Nogales, Arizona, U.S.	Nogales, Sonora, Mexico
Planaltina, Brazil when Federal District was set as the new national capital in 1960	Planaltina, Federal District	Planaltina, Goiás
Sault Ste. Marie, Michigan and Sault Ste. Marie, Ontario. Founded 1668 (France); split 1818, when south bank transferred to USA, while north bank remained British, now Canadian.	Sault Ste. Marie, Michigan, USA	Sault Ste. Marie, Ontario, Canada
Texarkana, United States	Texarkana, Texas	Texarkana, Arkansas
Washington, DC, U.S., and suburbs	Washington, DC	Georgetown (Washington, D.C.)—originally in Maryland, moved to the District of Columbia
Washington, DC, U.S., and suburbs	Alexandria, Virginia—originally in Virginia, moved to District of Columbia, moved back to Virginia	

=== Asia ===
- Tell Abyad, divided along the Baghdad Railway under the Treaty of Ankara in 1921
  - Tell Abyad, Syria
  - Akçakale, Turkey
- Arappınar, divided along the Baghdad Railway under the Treaty of Ankara in 1921
  - Kobanî, Syria
  - Mürşitpınar, Turkey
- Astara, divided under the Treaty of Turkmenchay (1828)
  - Astara, Azerbaijan
  - Astara, Iran
- Dibba, Portuguese fort
  - Dibba Al-Fujairah (دبا الفجيرة), ruled by the Emirate of Fujairah, UAE
  - Dibba Al-Hisn (دبا الحصن), ruled by the Emirate of Sharjah, UAE
  - Dibba Al-Baya (دبا البيعة), ruled by the Governorate of Musandam, Oman
- Ghajar divided between Israel and Lebanon
- Hili, India, divided since 1947 after partition of India
  - Hili, India
  - Hili, East Pakistan, now Bangladesh (1971–)
- Jerusalem (de facto reunited in 1967)
  - West Jerusalem, Israel
  - East Jerusalem (al-Quds), Palestine; Which was under Jordanian control 1948–1967, under Israeli control since 1967, claimed by Jordan 1967–1988; recognized by the international community as Palestinian territory under Israeli occupation 1967–present^{[a]}
- Julfa, divided under the Treaty of Turkmenchay (1828)
  - Julfa, Azerbaijan
  - Jolfa, Iran
- Lo Wu (the romanization used in Hong Kong) / Luohu (the romanization used in mainland China)
  - 1898–1911: divided between the Qing Empire and British Hong Kong
  - 1912–1939: divided between Guangdong Province, Republic of China and British Hong Kong
  - 1939–1941: divided between Japanese occupation zone (pronounced Rakō) and British Hong Kong
  - 1941–1945: both under Japanese occupation.
  - 1945–1949: divided between Guangdong Province, Republic of China and British Hong Kong
  - 1949–1997: divided between Guangdong Province, People's Republic of China and British Hong Kong
  - 1997–present: the People's Republic of China possesses the sovereignty of the entire town since Hong Kong was handed over to the People's Republic of China by the United Kingdom in 1997; the part that was previously possessed by British Hong Kong is now administered by the Hong Kong Special Administrative Region, and the rest of the town is still administered by Guangdong Province. Border controls are still in use.
- Padang Besar, Malay Peninsula, divided between Malaysia and Thailand. (Note: it is not clear whether the town constituted a single settlement divided by an international border, or is instead an example of a geographical twin city. However, both towns' names, and the majority of their inhabitants, are of Malay origin.)
  - Padang Besar, Malaysia
  - Padang Besar, Thailand
- Rafah divided between the Gaza Strip and Egypt
  - Rafah, Egypt
- Resülayn, divided along the Baghdad Railway under the Treaty of Ankara in 1921
  - Ra's al-'Ayn, Syria
  - Ceylanpınar, Turkey
- Sha Tau Kok (the romanization used in Hong Kong) / Shatoujiao (the romanization used in mainland China)
  - 1898–1911: divided between the Qing Empire and British Hong Kong
  - 1912–1939: divided between Guangdong Province, Republic of China and British Hong Kong
  - 1939–1941: divided between Japanese occupation zone (pronounced Satōgaku) and British Hong Kong
  - 1941–1945: both under Japanese occupation.
  - 1945–1949: divided between Guangdong Province, Republic of China and British Hong Kong
  - 1949–1997: divided between Guangdong Province, People's Republic of China and British Hong Kong
  - 1997–present: the People's Republic of China possesses the sovereignty of the entire town since Hong Kong was handed over to the People's Republic of China by the United Kingdom in 1997; the part that was previously possessed by British Hong Kong is now administered by the Hong Kong Special Administrative Region, and the rest of the town is still administered by Guangdong Province. Border controls are still in use.
- Aleppo, Syria, divided between SSG and YPG after the 2024 Battle of Aleppo.

=== Europe ===
- Baarle, divided since 1194, modern NL–BE division since 1831
  - Baarle-Nassau, Netherlands
  - Baarle-Hertog, Belgium
- Bad Muskau, Germany
  - Bad Muskau, Germany
  - Łęknica, Poland
- Bad Radkersburg, Austria-Hungary
  - Bad Radkersburg, Austria
  - Gornja Radgona, Kingdom of Serbs, Croats and Slovenes (now Slovenia)
- Berlin (since reunited) in Germany
  - West Berlin, closely associated with West Germany
  - East Berlin, East Germany
- Bliederstroff, Lorraine (officially divided under the Treaty of Paris in 1815)
  - Grosbliederstroff, France
  - Kleinblittersdorf, Germany
- Bratislava, Czechoslovakia
  - Bratislava, Slovakia
  - Engerau (Petržalka), Austria (reunited after World War II)
- Brod-on-Sava, Kingdom of Yugoslavia
  - Brod in Bosnia and Herzegovina
  - Slavonski Brod in Croatia
- Deryneia, Cyprus (de facto divided since 1974)
  - Deryneia, Cyprus
  - Kato Deryneia, North Cyprus
- Frankfurt (Oder), Germany
  - Frankfurt (Oder), East Germany, now Germany
  - Słubice, Poland
- Forst (Lausitz), Germany
  - Forst (Lausitz), Germany
  - Zasieki, Poland
- Gmünd, Austria-Hungary
  - Gmünd, Austria
  - České Velenice, Czechoslovakia, now Czech Republic
- Gorizia, Italy
  - Gorizia, Italy
  - Nova Gorica, Yugoslavia, now Slovenia
- Görlitz, Germany
  - Görlitz, East Germany, now Germany 60,000
  - Zgorzelec, Poland 38,000
- Guben, Germany
  - Guben, East Germany, now Germany 22,000
  - Gubin, Poland 19,000
- Herzogenrath, divided since 1815 at the Congress of Vienna (before that, department of Meuse-Inférieure)
  - Herzogenrath, Germany (47,187)
  - Kerkrade, Netherlands (47,681)
- Komárom, Austria-Hungary
  - Komárom, Hungary
  - Komárno, Czechoslovakia, now Slovakia
- Kosovska Mitrovica, Kosovo
  - ethnic-Albanian south (Republic of Kosovo-controlled)
  - ethnic-Serb north (North Kosovo)
- Küstrin, Germany
  - Kostrzyn nad Odrą, Poland
  - Küstrin-Kietz, Germany
- Laufenburg, divided between Switzerland and Germany
  - Laufenburg, Switzerland
  - Laufenburg, Germany
- Mödlareuth, Germany (now without boundary wall)
  - Mödlareuth, Gefell, Thuringia, East Germany
  - Mödlareuth, Töpen, Bavaria, West Germany
- Mostar (since reunited) in Bosnia and Herzegovina between Croatian Republic of Herzeg-Bosnia and Republic of Bosnia and Herzegovina.
- Narva, Russian Empire/Soviet Union
  - Narva, Estonia
  - Ivangorod, Russia
- Nicosia, capital of Cyprus, divided since 1964 and still divided (North Nicosia).
- Pello
- Rheinfelden
  - Rheinfelden (Aargau) (Switzerland)
  - Rheinfelden (Baden) (Germany)
- Rijeka, Croatia
  - Fiume, Italy (1924–1944)
  - Sušak, Kingdom of Yugoslavia (reunited after World War II)
- Rome, Papal States
  - Rome, Italy
  - Vatican City
- Saint-Gingolph, Switzerland (since March 4, 1569)
  - Saint-Gingolph, Switzerland
  - Saint-Gingolph, France
- Saltney, divided between England and Wales
- Sarajevo, capital of Bosnia and Herzegovina, after the Dayton Agreement which politically defined the country's political structure, has most of the city within the Federation of Bosnia and Herzegovina, while some suburbs are within the boundaries of Republika Srpska.
- Sátoraljaújhely, Austria-Hungary
  - Sátoraljaújhely, Hungary
  - Slovenské Nové Mesto, Czechoslovakia, now Slovakia
- Siget, Austria-Hungary
  - Sighetu Marmației, Romania
  - Solotvyno, Ukraine
- Teschen, Austrian Silesia
  - Cieszyn, Poland
  - Český Těšín, Czechoslovakia, now Czech Republic
- Walk, Livonia
  - Valga, Estonia
  - Valka, Latvia
- Veľké Slemence
  - divided between Slovakia and Ukraine (connected with an exclusive border just for the village, the only one in the Schengen area)

=== Oceania ===
- Coolangatta and Tweed Heads, Australia
  - Coolangatta, Queensland
  - Tweed Heads, New South Wales
- Albury-Wodonga, Australia
  - Albury, New South Wales
  - Wodonga, Victoria

== Cities that arose next to each other across a boundary line ==
=== Africa ===
Cross-border town	Countries
Aflao and Lomé	Ghana / Togo
Brazzaville and Kinshasa	Republic of the Congo / Democratic Republic of the Congo
Um Dafuq and Am Dafok	Sudan/Central African Republic

=== Asia ===
Cross-border town	Countries
Blagoveshchensk and Heihe	Russia / China
Chandigarh, Panchkula, Mohali	India
Islamabad–Rawalpindi	Pakistan
Jaigaon and Phuntsholing	India / Bhutan
Johor Bahru and Singapore	Malaysia / Singapore
Kara-Suu and Qorasuv	Kyrgyzstan / Uzbekistan
Korgas /Khorgos	China / Kazakhstan
Shenzhen /Hong Kong	China
Tachileik and Mae Sai	Myanmar / Thailand

=== Europe ===
Cross-border town	Countries
Como and Chiasso	Italy / Switzerland
Konstanz and Kreuzlingen	Germany / Switzerland
Monaco and Beausoleil, Alpes-Maritimes, Les Moneghetti, Saint-Antoine, Figuièra, Les Salines	Monaco / France
Póvoa de Varzim and Vila do Conde	Portugal
Giurgiu and Ruse	Romania / Bulgaria
Gdańsk and Gdynia	Poland
Zvornik, and Mali Zvornik	Bosnia and Herzegovina / Serbia
Tornio and Haparanda	Finland / Sweden

=== North America ===
Cross-border town	Countries
Derby Line, Vermont and Stanstead, Quebec	United States / Canada
Detroit–Windsor	United States / Canada
Ottawa and Gatineau	Canada
Niagara Falls, New York and Niagara Falls, Ontario	United States / Canada
Philadelphia, Pennsylvania and Camden, New Jersey	United States
New York City and its neighbors (Jersey City, West New York, Hoboken, New Jersey, etc.) across the Hudson River	United States
Sault Ste. Marie, Michigan and Sault Ste. Marie, Ontario	United States / Canada
Sarnia, Ontario and Port Huron, Michigan	United States / Canada
Texhoma, Oklahoma and Texhoma, Texas	United States
Union City, Indiana and Union City, Ohio	United States
Tegucigalpa and Comayagua	Honduras
San Diego-Tijuana	United States / Mexico

=== South America ===
Cross-border town	Countries
Aceguá and Aceguá	Brazil / Uruguay
Chuí and Chuy	Brazil / Uruguay
Leticia and Tabatinga	Colombia / Brazil
Rivera and Santana do Livramento	Uruguay / Brazil

== See also ==
- Border town
- Cross-border town naming
- List of divided islands
- Transborder agglomeration

== Notes and references ==
Notes:

a.	There was international controversy on the status of Jerusalem in 1948 which has been further complicated since 1967. See positions on Jerusalem for further information.
