= Twin cities =

Neighboring cities that become a conurbation

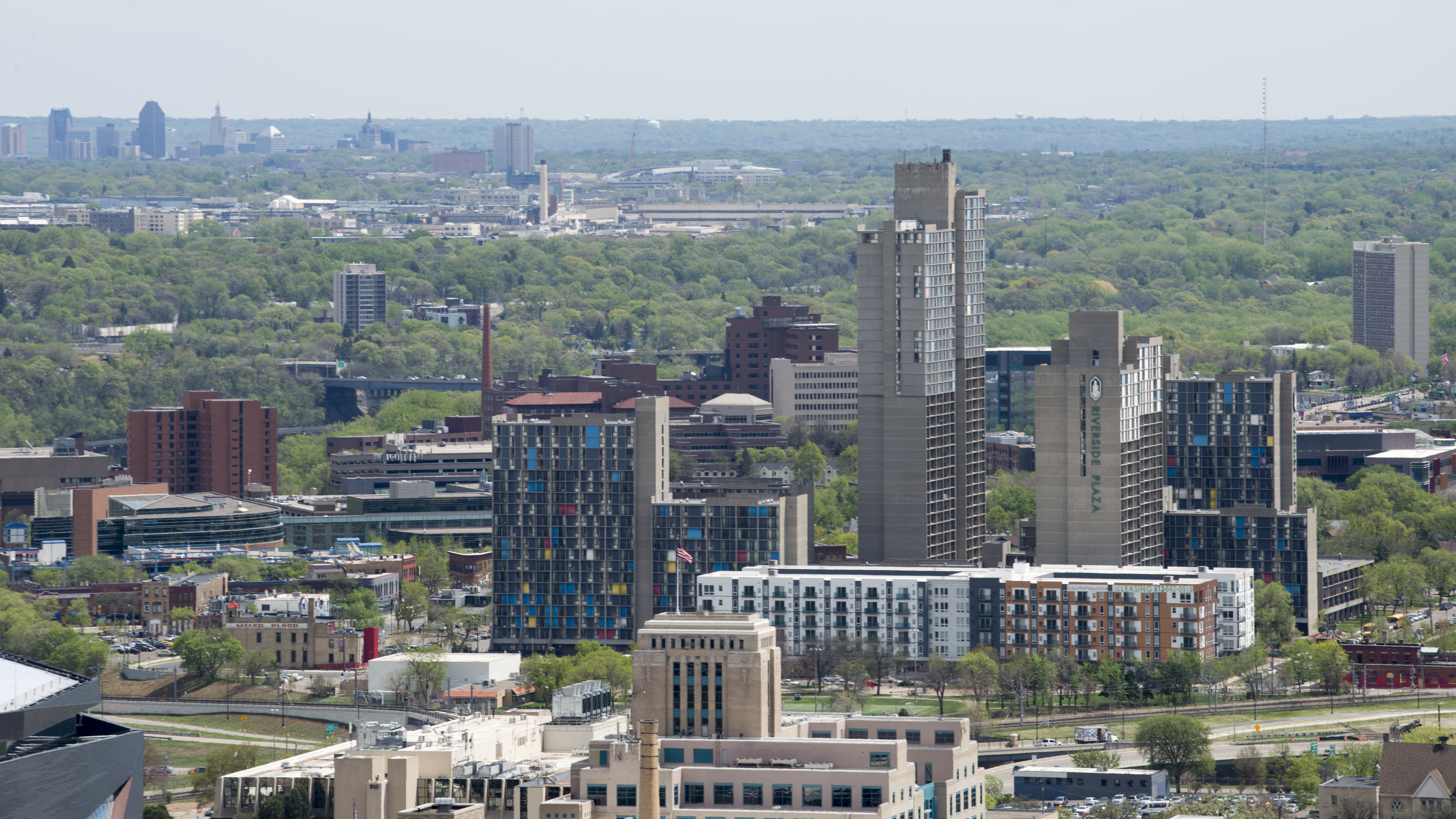
High-rise buildings in Minneapolis's Cedar-Riverside neighborhood, with the Downtown Saint Paul skyline visible in the background ten miles away. Minneapolis' city limits border those of Saint Paul, the capital of Minnesota. This gave birth to the nickname of the region, the "Twin Cities" metropolitan area.

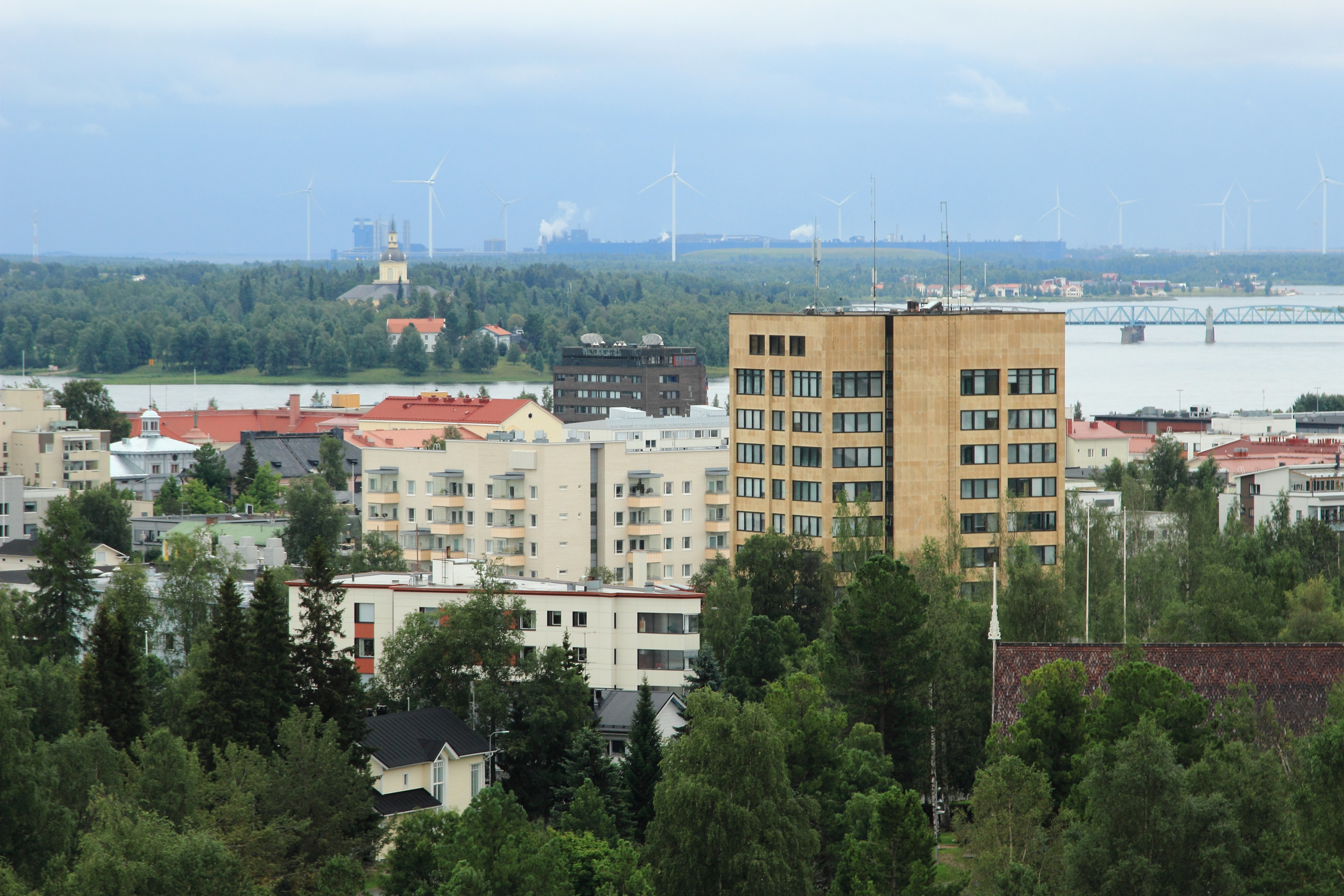
A view of the town of Tornio (Finland), which forms a twin city with Haparanda (Sweden)

Twin cities are a special case of two neighboring cities or urban centers that grow into a single conurbation, or narrowly separated urban areas, over time. Twin cities are generally comparable in status and size, though not necessarily equal. Although there are no formal criteria, a city and a substantially smaller suburb would not typically qualify, even if they were once separate. Tri-cities and quad cities are similar groups of three or four municipalities, respectively.

A common but not universal scenario is two cities that developed concurrently on opposite sides of a river. For example, Minneapolis and Saint Paul in Minnesota—one of the most widely known pairs of "Twin Cities"—were founded several miles apart on opposite sides of the Mississippi River and competed for prominence as they grew.

In some cases, twin cities are separated by a state border, such as Albury (New South Wales) and Wodonga (Victoria) in Australia, on opposite sides of the Murray River. In Pakistan, Islamabad and Rawalpindi are twin cities located in the northwestern Punjab region; Islamabad is administratively part of the Islamabad Capital Territory, and Rawalpindi is in the province of Punjab. Cities on opposite sides of international borders sometimes share enough cultural and historical identity to be seen as twins, such as Haparanda (Sweden) and Tornio (Finland), Leticia (Colombia) and Tabatinga (Brazil), or Valga (Estonia) and Valka (Latvia).

In some cases, twin cities eventually merge into a single legal municipality, such as Buda and Pest merging in 1873 into Budapest, Hungary; Brooklyn and New York City being consolidated in 1898; and the three ancient cities of Hankou, Hanyang, and Wuchang joining in 1927 into Wuhan. As a single urban area, twin cities may share an airport whose airport codes include both cities' initials, e.g., DFW (Dallas–Fort Worth), LBA (Leeds–Bradford), MSP (Minneapolis–Saint Paul), RDU (Raleigh and Durham), and CAK (Akron–Canton).

== Twin cities ==
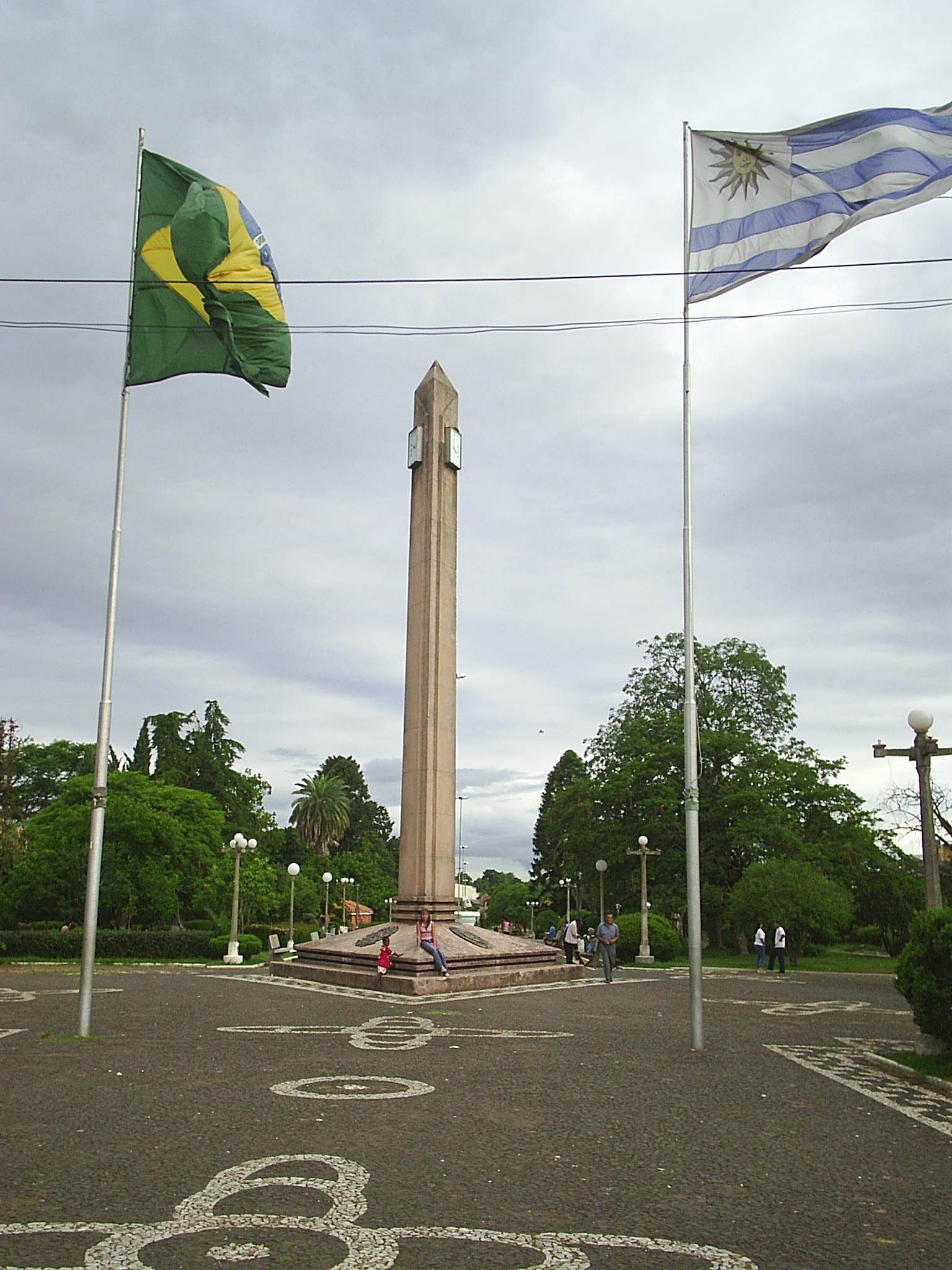
Cross-border example of twin cities: Plaza Internacional of the Frontera de la Paz. On the left, Santana do Livramento (Brazil); on the right, Rivera (Uruguay).

=== List of international and regional border towns and cities ===
==== Africa ====
Border towns	Countries
Kinshasa and Brazzaville	Democratic Republic of the Congo / Republic of the Congo
Goma and Gisenyi	Democratic Republic of the Congo / Rwanda
Kousséri and N'Djamena	Cameroon / Chad
Aflao and Lomé	Ghana / Togo
Victoria Falls and Livingstone	Zimbabwe / Zambia

==== Asia ====
Border towns	Countries
Astara and Astara	Azerbaijan / Iran
Erenhot and Zamyn-Üüd	China / Mongolia
Dandong and Sinuiju	China / North Korea
Changbai and Hyesan	China / North Korea
Ji'an and Manpo	China / North Korea
Manzhouli and Zabaykalsk	China / Russia
Heihe and Blagoveshchensk	China / Russia
Dongxing and Mong Cai	China / Vietnam
Hekou and Lao Cai	China / Vietnam
Johor Bahru and Singapore	Malaysia / Singapore
Vientiane and Nong Khai	Thailand / Laos
Dansavan and Lao Bao	Laos / Vietnam
Al Ain and Al Buraimi	United Arab Emirates / Oman
Agartala and Akhaura	India / Bangladesh
Eilat and Aqaba	Israel / Jordan
Jincheng and Xiamen	Taiwan / China
Hong Kong and Shenzhen	Hong Kong / China

==== Europe ====
Border towns	Countries
Bad Radkersburg and Gornja Radgona	Austria / Slovenia
Comines and Comines	France / Belgium
Mouscron and Tourcoing	France / Belgium
Wervik and Wervicq-Sud	France / Belgium
Hrvatska Kostajnica and Kostajnica	Croatia / Bosnia and Herzegovina
Slavonski Brod and Brod	Croatia / Bosnia and Herzegovina
Český Těšín and Cieszyn	Czech Republic / Poland
Copenhagen and Malmö	Denmark / Sweden
Helsingør and Helsingborg	Denmark / Sweden
Valga and Valka	Estonia / Latvia
Narva and Ivangorod	Estonia / Russia
Imatra and Svetogorsk	Finland / Russia
Tornio and Haparanda	Finland / Sweden
Strasbourg and Kehl	France / Germany
Hendaye and Irun	Spain / France
Frankfurt (Oder) and Słubice	Poland / Germany
Görlitz and Zgorzelec	Poland / Germany
Guben and Gubin	Poland / Germany
Heringsdorf and Świnoujście	Poland / Germany
Konstanz and Kreuzlingen	Switzerland / Germany
Laufenburg (Baden) and Laufenburg, Aargau (Note: Separated by the Rhine River (used to be one city until 1801/1802).)	Switzerland / Germany
Esztergom and Štúrovo	Hungary / Slovakia
Komárno and Komárom	Hungary / Slovakia
Strabane and Lifford	Ireland / United Kingdom
Gorizia and Nova Gorica	Italy / Slovenia
Kerkrade and Herzogenrath	Netherlands / Germany
La Línea de la Concepción and Gibraltar	Spain / United Kingdom
Basel, Weil am Rhein and Saint Louis	Switzerland / Germany / France
Sarp and Sarpi	Turkey / Georgia
Tui and Valença	Spain / Portugal
Aubange, Longwy and Pétange	Belgium / France / Luxembourg

==== North America ====
Border towns	Bordering countries
Niagara Falls, Ontario and Niagara Falls, New York	United States / Canada
Sault Ste. Marie, Ontario and Sault Ste. Marie, Michigan	United States / Canada
Stanstead, Quebec and Derby Line, Vermont	United States / Canada
North Portal, Saskatchewan and Portal, North Dakota	United States / Canada
Tecate, Baja California and Tecate, California	United States / Mexico
Boquillas del Carmen, Coahuila and Boquillas, Texas	United States / Mexico
Naco, Sonora and Naco, Arizona	United States / Mexico
Nogales, Sonora and Nogales, Arizona	United States / Mexico
San Luis Río Colorado, Sonora and San Luis, Arizona	United States / Mexico
Nuevo Laredo, Tamaulipas and Laredo, Texas	United States / Mexico
Nuevo Progreso, Río Bravo, Tamaulipas and Progreso, Texas	United States / Mexico
Calexico, California and Mexicali, Baja California (Calexico–Mexicali)	United States / Mexico
Ciudad Hidalgo, Chiapas and Ayutla, San Marcos	Mexico / Guatemala
Detroit, Michigan and Windsor, Ontario (Detroit–Windsor)	United States / Canada
International Falls, Minnesota and Fort Frances, Ontario	United States / Canada
Douglas, Arizona and Agua Prieta, Sonora	United States / Mexico
Yuma, Arizona and San Luis Río Colorado, Sonora	United States / Mexico
San Diego, California and Tijuana, Baja California see San Diego–Tijuana	United States / Mexico
Brownsville, Texas and Matamoros, Tamaulipas see Brownsville–Matamoros	United States / Mexico
Del Rio, Texas and Ciudad Acuña, Coahuila	United States / Mexico
Eagle Pass, Texas and Piedras Negras, Coahuila	United States / Mexico
El Paso, Texas and Ciudad Juárez, Chihuahua see El Paso–Juárez	United States / Mexico
Presidio, Texas and Manuel Ojinaga, Chihuahua	United States / Mexico

==== South America ====
Border towns	Countries
Sant'Ana do Livramento and Rivera	Brazil / Uruguay
Chuí and Chuy	Brazil / Uruguay
Tabatinga and Leticia	Brazil / Colombia
Puerto Iguazú, Foz do Iguaçu, Ciudad del Este, and Presidente Franco	Argentina / Brazil / Paraguay
Posadas and Encarnación	Argentina / Paraguay
Concordia and Salto	Argentina / Uruguay
Salvador Mazza and Yacuiba	Argentina / Bolivia

=== List of internal border towns and cities ===
==== Africa ====
Twin towns	Country
Cairo and Giza. Triple cities if counting Shubra El Kheima.	Egypt
Port Said and Port Fuad	Egypt
Sekondi-Takoradi	Ghana
Asaba and Onitsha	Nigeria
Jimeta and Yola	Nigeria
Johannesburg and Pretoria, Gauteng Province	South Africa

==== Asia ====
Twin towns	Country
Dhaka and Narayanganj	Bangladesh
Guangzhou and Foshan	China
Xi'an and Xianyang	China
Beijing and Langfang	China
Wuxi and Suzhou	China
Chaozhou and Shantou	China
Haifeng and Lufeng	China
Ahmedabad and Gandhinagar, Gujarat	India
Allahabad and Naini, Uttar Pradesh	India
Bangalore, Karnataka and Hosur, Tamil Nadu	India
Bishangarh and Jalore, Rajasthan	India
Chümoukedima and Dimapur, Nagaland	India
Cuttack and Bhubaneswar, Odisha	India
Durg and Bhilai, Chhattisgarh	India
Hubli and Dharwad, Karnataka	India
Mysore and Srirangapatna, Karnataka	India
Kankroli and Rajsamand, Rajasthan	India
Kochi and Ernakulam, Kerala	India
Kolkata and Howrah, West Bengal	India
Mumbai and Navi Mumbai, Maharashtra	India
Kalyan and Dombivli, Maharashtra	India
Mira and Bhayandar, Maharashtra	India
Vasai and Virar, Maharashtra	India
Ambarnath and Badlapur, Maharashtra	India
Pimpri and Chinchwad, Maharashtra	India
Sangli and Miraj, Maharashtra	India
Munger and Jamalpur, Bihar	India
Noida and Greater Noida, Uttar Pradesh	India
Pondicherry and Cuddalore	India
Ranchi and Hatia, Jharkhand	India
Surat and Navsari, Gujarat	India
Sumerpur and Sheoganj, Rajasthan	India
Thrissur and Guruvayur, Kerala	India
Vijayawada and Guntur, Andhra Pradesh	India
Bangarpet and Kolar Gold Fields, Karnataka	India
Harihar and Davangere, Karnataka	India
Shivamoga and Bhadravati, Karnataka	India
Tiruchirappalli and Srirangam, Tamil Nadu	India
Tirunelveli and Palayamkottai, Tamil Nadu	India
Marthandam and Kuzhithurai, Tamil Nadu	India
Hyderabad and Secunderabad, Telangana	India
Warangal and Hanamkonda, Telangana	India
Asansol and Durgapur, West Bengal	India
Barrackpore and Barasat, West Bengal	India
Coochbehar and Alipurduar, West Bengal	India
Jalpaiguri and Mainaguri, West Bengal	India
Siliguri and Jalpaiguri, West Bengal	India
Berhampore and Murshidabad, West Bengal	India
Erbil and Mosul	Iraq
Seleucia and Ctesiphon (Note: Formed historic Al-Mada'in.)	Iraq
Ramla and Lod	Israel
Aomori and Hakodate	Japan
Kamisu and Kashima (Note: Co-centers of a shared micropolitan area.)	Japan
Kitakyushu and Shimonoseki	Japan
Kyoto and Otsu	Japan
Maebashi and Takasaki	Japan
Nasushiobara and Otawara (Note: Co-centers of a shared micropolitan area.)	Japan
Okayama and Kurashiki (Note: Kurashiki is somewhat more of a suburb)	Japan
Osaka and Sakai (Note: Co-centers of a shared major metropolitan area. See Keihanshin)	Japan
Sanjo and Tsubame	Japan
Toyohashi and Toyokawa	Japan
Tsukuba and Tsuchiura (Note: Co-centers of a shared major metropolitan area.)	Japan
Yokkaichi and Suzuka	Japan
Karagandy and Temirtau	Kazakhstan
Beirut and Jounieh, Lebanon	Lebanon
Kuala Lumpur and Putrajaya,	Malaysia
Bharatpur and Gaindakot	Nepal
Butwal and Tilottama	Nepal
Nepalgunj and Kohalpur	Nepal
Rason and Chongjin	North Korea
Jhelum and Sarai Alamgir	Pakistan
Peshawar and Mardan	Pakistan
Rawalpindi and Islamabad	Pakistan
Ramallah and al-Bireh	Palestine
Angeles and Mabalacat	Philippines
Baguio and La Trinidad	Philippines
Bantay and Vigan	Philippines
Bayombong and Solano	Philippines
Dagupan and Lingayen	Philippines
Daraga and Legazpi	Philippines
Dipolog and Dapitan	Philippines
General Santos and Alabel	Philippines
Laoag and San Nicolas	Philippines
Lemery and Taal	Philippines
Palo and Tacloban	Philippines
Santo Tomas and Tanauan	Philippines
Dammam and Khobar	Saudi Arabia
Seoul and Incheon, South Korea	South Korea
Busan and Ulsan, South Korea	South Korea
Sejong City and Daejeon, South Korea	South Korea
Yangyang and Sokcho, South Korea	South Korea
Taipei and New Taipei, Taiwan	Taiwan
Kaohsiung and Tainan, Taiwan	Taiwan
Zhubei and Hsinchu, Taiwan	Taiwan
Bangkok and Nonthaburi, Thailand	Thailand
Chiang Mai and Lamphun, Thailand	Thailand
Songkhla and Hatyai, Thailand	Thailand
Ho Chi Minh City and Binh Duong	Vietnam
Phan Rang-Tháp Chàm	Vietnam

===== Historic =====
Twin towns	Country
Victoria and Kowloon, colonial Hong Kong—although, in both colonial Hong Kong and the Hong Kong Special Administrative Region, Victoria is the only city recognised by law; they were widely considered to be separate cities until at least the mid-1970s.	British Hong Kong
Wuhan (merger of Wuchang, Hankou, Hanyang)	China
Chirala-Perala	India
Bangalore Cantonment and Bengaluru Pete along with their suburbs merged to form modern Bangalore	India
Jaffa and the rapidly-growing Tel Aviv merged to form one municipality, Tel Aviv-Yafo, in April 1950.	Israel
Fukuoka (merger of east side of Naka river, Hakata, and the west side, Fukuoka)	Japan
Ise (merger of Uji, Yamada)	Japan
Joetsu (merger of Takada, Naoetsu)	Japan
Naha and Shuri, Okinawa, once separate cities. Shuri became integrated as a district of Naha.	Japan
Iloilo and Jaro, once separate cities, were consolidated into Iloilo City.	Philippines
Zhongli and Taoyuan, merged into Taoyuan City.	Taiwan
Saigon and Cholon, merged into Saigon-Cholon, now Ho Chi Minh City.	South Vietnam

==== Europe ====
Twin towns	Country
Nørresundby and Aalborg	Denmark
Kotka and Hamina	Finland
Frejus and Saint-Raphaël	France
Lyon and Villeurbanne	France
Göteborg and Mölndal	Sweden
Düsseldorf and Neuss	Germany
Frankfurt and Offenbach	Germany
Ludwigshafen and Mannheim	Germany
Mainz and Wiesbaden	Germany
Mönchengladbach and Rheydt	Germany
Nuremberg and Fuerth	Germany
Sindelfingen and Böblingen	Germany
Ulm and Neu-Ulm	Germany
Villingen-Schwenningen	Germany
Ballybofey and Stranorlar, in County Donegal, Ireland are often called the Twin Towns. They form the built up area of Ballybofey and Stranorlar.	Ireland
Fredrikstad and Sarpsborg	Norway
Porsgrunn and Skien. Together with Tollnes, Gulset and Åfoss they form the Grenland urban area.	Norway
Sandnes and Stavanger	Norway
Bydgoszcz and Toruń	Poland
Kalisz and Ostrów Wielkopolski	Poland
Porto and Vila Nova de Gaia	Portugal
Póvoa de Varzim and Vila do Conde	Portugal
Alcobendas and San Sebastián de los Reyes	Spain
Aldaia and Alaquàs	Spain
Coslada and San Fernando de Henares	Spain
Elda and Petrer	Spain
Llombai and Catadau	Spain
Santa Cruz de Tenerife and San Cristóbal de la Laguna	Spain
Ferrol and Narón	Spain
Jönköping and Huskvarna	Sweden
Donetsk and Makiivka	Ukraine
Kramatorsk and Sloviansk	Ukraine
Sievierodonetsk and Lysychansk	Ukraine
Pokrovsk and Myrnohrad	Ukraine
Brighton and Hove	United Kingdom
Chatham and Rochester	United Kingdom
Leeds and Bradford	United Kingdom
Manchester and Salford	United Kingdom
Newcastle upon Tyne and Gateshead	United Kingdom
Liverpool and Birkenhead	United Kingdom
Warwick and Leamington Spa	United Kingdom

===== Historic =====
Twin towns	Country
Knokke and Heist-aan-Zee. United into Knokke-Heist	Belgium
Frýdek and Místek. United into Frýdek-Místek	Czech Republic
Barmen and Elberfeld. United into Wuppertal.	Germany
Bonn and Beuel. United into Bonn.	Germany
Kouvola and Kuusankoski. United into Kouvola.	Finland
Äänekoski and Suolahti. United into Äänekoski.	Finland
West Berlin, West Germany and East Berlin. United into Berlin.	East Germany
Buda and Pest. United into Budapest.	Hungary
Bielsko and Biała. United into Bielsko-Biała.	Poland
Skanör and Falsterbo. United into Skanör med Falsterbo.	Sweden
City of London and City of Westminster. Absorbed into London.	United Kingdom
Berwick-upon-Tweed and Tweedmouth, until the former was taken by England from Scotland.	United Kingdom
Novi Sad and Petrovaradin, merged into Novi Sad on 9 October 1929.	Yugoslavia

==== North America ====
Twin towns	Country
Halifax and Dartmouth, Nova Scotia (Note: Main cities of Metropolitan Halifax, they are geographically separated by Halifax Harbour)	Canada
Kitchener and Waterloo, Ontario	Canada
Battleford and North Battleford, Saskatchewan "The Battlefords" (Note: Separated by the North Saskatchewan River. While the communities are commonly referred to by the collective "The Battlefords," they retain distinctive identities.)	Canada
Toronto and Mississauga, Ontario	Canada
Ottawa, Ontario and Gatineau, Quebec	Canada
Phenix City, Alabama and Columbus, Georgia	United States
Lookout Mountain, Georgia and Lookout Mountain, Tennessee	United States
Texarkana, Arkansas and Texarkana, Texas (Note: The cities meet at the border between Texas and Arkansas, and their name is a portmanteau of those states' names as well as that of Louisiana, whose border lies approximately 25 miles to the south. See Texarkana metropolitan area and Ark-La-Tex.)	United States
San Bernardino and Riverside, California	United States
Fort Collins and Loveland, Colorado	United States
Hartford and New Britain, Connecticut	United States
Fort Myers and Cape Coral, Florida	United States
Fort Lauderdale and Miami, Florida	United States
St. Petersburg and Tampa, Florida (Note: Main cities of the Tampa Bay Area.)	United States
Augusta, Georgia and North Augusta, South Carolina	United States
Boulder and Longmont, Colorado	United States
Champaign and Urbana, Illinois (Note: Champaign was originally known as West Urbana but has since outgrown its neighbor. See Champaign–Urbana metropolitan area.)	United States
Bloomington and Normal, Illinois	United States
Lafayette and West Lafayette, Indiana	United States
South Bend and Mishawaka, Indiana	United States
Waterloo and Cedar Falls, Iowa	United States
Bangor and Brewer, Maine	United States
Lewiston and Auburn, Maine (Note: Also called the Twin Cities or L–A. See Lewiston–Auburn)	United States
Benton Harbor and St. Joseph, Michigan	United States
Montague and Whitehall, Michigan	United States
Houghton and Hancock, Michigan	United States
Otsego and Plainwell, Michigan	United States
Duluth, Minnesota, and Superior, Wisconsin (Note: Nicknamed the Twin Ports, these form the world's largest freshwater port.)	United States
Minneapolis and Saint Paul, Minnesota (Note: Also known as the Twin Cities)	United States
Natchez, Mississippi and Vidalia, Louisiana (Note: The cities are connected by two twin cantilever bridges which merge the two cities together as sister cities. The cities meet on the Mississippi and Louisiana state border and along the Mississippi River adjacent to each other. They both share long history together. Natchez, Mississippi is also a historical part of Concordia Parish, Louisiana, to which Vidalia is the seat of Concordia Parish. See Natchez–Vidalia Bridge, Concordia Parish and Adams County, Mississippi.)	United States
Crystal City and Festus, Missouri	United States
New York, New York and Jersey City, New Jersey	United States
Raleigh and Durham, North Carolina	United States
Winston-Salem and Greensboro, North Carolina	United States
Piscataway and New Brunswick, New Jersey	United States
Fargo, North Dakota, and Moorhead, Minnesota (Note: See Fargo–Moorhead.)	United States
Grand Forks, North Dakota and East Grand Forks, Minnesota	United States
Cincinnati, Ohio and Covington, Kentucky	United States
Portland, Oregon and Vancouver, Washington	United States
Delmar, Maryland and Delmar, Delaware	United States
Scranton and Wilkes-Barre, Pennsylvania (Note: The core cities of the Wyoming Valley in northeastern Pennsylvania.)	United States
Allentown and Bethlehem, Pennsylvania	United States
Greenville and Spartanburg, South Carolina (Note: The two largest cities of Upstate South Carolina. Their shared international airport is named after both cities (Greenville–Spartanburg International Airport).)	United States
Bristol, Tennessee and Bristol, Virginia	United States
Memphis, Tennessee and West Memphis, Arkansas	United States
Dallas and Fort Worth, Texas (Note: Twin cores of the Metroplex of northern Texas.)	United States
Midland and Odessa, Texas (Note: Nicknamed the Petroplex in a nod to the DFW region's nickname, as well as its strong reliance on the oil industry.)	United States
Bluefield, Virginia and Bluefield, West Virginia	United States
Neenah and Menasha, Wisconsin	United States
Marinette, Wisconsin, and Menominee, Michigan	United States
Seattle and Tacoma, Washington	United States
Wahpeton, North Dakota and Breckenridge, Minnesota	United States
Bismarck and Mandan, North Dakota	United States
Christiansted and Frederiksted, United States Virgin Islands (Note: The island in which these cities inhabit, Saint Croix, is often referred to as "Twin City" even saying so on its Wikipedia page.)	United States Virgin Islands

===== Historic =====
Twin city	Country
Lloydminster, Alberta/Saskatchewan	Canada
Thunder Bay, Ontario (Note: Fort William and Port Arthur amalgamated)	Canada
Saginaw and East Saginaw, Michigan (Note: East Saginaw annexed by Saginaw in 1889.)	United States
Stanwood and East Stanwood, Washington (Note: The two Stanwoods consolidated in 1960.)	United States
Brooklyn and New York City, New York (Note: Prior to their consolidation into a single city in 1898 - as noted in the poem "The New Colossus", which is inscribed on a plaque at the Statue of Liberty.)	United States

==== South America ====
Twin cities	Country
Carmen de Patagones and Viedma	Argentina
Paraná and Santa Fe	Argentina
Corrientes and Resistencia	Argentina
Americana and Santa Bárbara d'Oeste	Brazil
Juazeiro and Petrolina	Brazil
Olinda and Recife	Brazil
Vila Velha and Vitória	Brazil
Ponta Porã and Mato Grosso do Sul	Brazil
Concepción and Talcahuano	Chile
Coquimbo and La Serena	Chile
Valparaíso and Viña del Mar	Chile
Pedro Juan Caballero and Amambay	Paraguay
Callao and Lima	Peru
Acarigua and Araure	Venezuela
Guarenas and Guatire	Venezuela

==== Oceania ====
Twin city	Country
Albury and Wodonga	Australia
Canberra and Queanbeyan	Australia
Darwin and Palmerston	Australia
Echuca and Moama	Australia
Forster and Tuncurry	Australia
Gold Coast and Tweed Heads	Australia
Harden and Murrumburrah	Australia
Kalgoorlie and Boulder	Australia
Perth and Fremantle	Australia
Townsville and Thuringowa	Australia
Napier and Hastings	New Zealand
Lower Hutt and Upper Hutt	New Zealand

== Tri-cities ==
Border towns	Bordering countries
Brisbane; Gold Coast; and Sunshine Coast, Queensland— see South East Queensland	Australia
Sydney; Wollongong; and Newcastle, in the geological region known as the Sydney Basin	Australia
The Tri-cities of British Columbia consist of Coquitlam, Port Coquitlam, and Port Moody	Canada
The Tri-citites of Kitchener; Waterloo; and Cambridge, Ontario, the cities' collective metropolitan area is often called the K-W Tri-City Area	Canada
Tri-Town, Ontario- Cobalt, Haileybury and New Liskeard	Canada
Xiamen, Quanzhou, Zhangzhou, Fujian	China
Wuppertal, Remscheid, Solingen, Rhineland, originally a quad-city until 1929, when Elberfeld and Barmen merged to form Wuppertal	Germany
Chandigarh; Mohali; and Panchkula	India
Vijayawada; Amaravati; and Guntur	India
Chennai, Avadi and Tambaram	India
Ranipet, Walajapet and Arcot	India
Warangal; Hanamkonda; Kazipet — see Warangal Tri-City	India
Kyoto; Osaka; Kobe - see Keihanshin	Japan
Parit Buntar, Perak; Nibong Tebal, Penang; and Bandar Baharu, Kedah	Malaysia
Guadalajara; Tlaquepaque; Zapopan, Jalisco	Mexico
Bhaktapur; Kathmandu; and Patan	Nepal
Tricity, consisting of the cities of Baglung, Beni and Kushma	Nepal
Bacolod; Silay; Talisay	Philippines
Cebu City; Mandaue; and Lapu-Lapu City	Philippines
Angeles City; Mabalacat; and San Fernando	Philippines
Gdańsk; Gdynia; and Sopot — see Tricity	Poland
Wejherowo; Rumia; and Reda — see Kashubian Tricity	Poland
The Dammam metropolitan area, consisting of Dammam; Dhahran; and Khobar	Saudi Arabia
The metropolitan municipalities of Johannesburg, Tshwane (Pretoria) and Ekurhuleni (East Rand), Gauteng Province	South Africa
Gqeberha (Port Elizabeth), Kariega (Uitenhage) and Despatch in Nelson Mandela Bay Metropolitan Municipality, Eastern Cape Province	South Africa
East London, Bhisho and Qonce (King William's Town) in Buffalo City Metropolitan Municipality, Eastern Cape Province	South Africa
Khartoum; North Khartoum; and Omdurman	Sudan
Stockholm; Solna; and Sundbyberg	Sweden
Trollhättan; Uddevalla; and Vänersborg	Sweden
The Dubai-Sharjah-Ajman metropolitan area, consisting of Dubai; Sharjah; and Ajman, United Arab Emirates	United Arab Emirates
Burbank; Glendale; and Pasadena, in Los Angeles County, California	United States
Fremont; Newark; and Union City, in Alameda County, California	United States
Oceanside; Vista; and Carlsbad, in San Diego County, California	United States
Riverside; San Bernardino; and Ontario, California, the cities' collective metropolitan area is often called the Inland Empire	United States
San Jose; San Francisco; and Oakland, California (Note: the principal cities of the San Francisco Bay area.)	United States
College Park; East Point; and Hapeville, Georgia, all of which are near Hartsfield–Jackson Atlanta International Airport	United States
Bay City; Saginaw; and Midland, Michigan, the cities' collective metropolitan area is often called the Greater Tri Cities, the Great Lakes Bay Region or the MBS region	United States
Ferrysburg; Grand Haven; and Spring Lake, Michigan	United States
Iron River, Caspian, and Gaastra, Michigan	United States
Ironwood; Bessemer; and Wakefield, Michigan	United States
Grand Island; Kearney; and Hastings, in south-central Nebraska, also known as Tri-Cities, Nebraska	United States
Rochester; Dover; and Somersworth, New Hampshire	United States
Farmington; Bloomfield; and Aztec, New Mexico	United States
Albany, Troy, and Schenectady, New York, in the region known as the Capital District	United States
Binghamton; Endicott; and Johnson City, New York, the cities' collective metropolitan area is often called the Triple Cities	United States
New York, New York; Newark; and Jersey City, New Jersey	United States
Greensboro; Winston-Salem; and High Point, North Carolina, the cities' collective metropolitan area is often called the Piedmont Triad	United States
Raleigh; Durham; and Chapel Hill, North Carolina, the cities' collective metropolitan area is often called the Research Triangle	United States
Tuttle; Newcastle; and Blanchard, Oklahoma, also known as the Tri-City Area	United States
Johnson City; Kingsport; and Bristol, Tennessee/Bristol, Virginia, also known as Tri-Cities, Tennessee	United States
Beaumont; Port Arthur; and Orange, Texas, also known as the Golden Triangle (Texas)	United States
Dallas; Fort Worth; and Arlington, Texas	United States
Petersburg; Colonial Heights; and Hopewell, Virginia, also known as Tri-Cities, Virginia	United States
Pasco; Richland; and Kennewick, Washington, also known as Tri-Cities, Washington	United States
Washington, D.C., Alexandria, Virginia, and Arlington County, Virginia	United States

== Quad cities ==
Border towns	Bordering countries
Xinhui, Taishan, Kaiping, and Enping together formed Siyi area in Jiangmen, Guangdong	China
Helsinki, Espoo, Kauniainen and Vantaa in Uusimaa; together form the largest metropolis in the country and its actual capital area.	Finland
Pattaya–Chonburi metropolitan area, consisting of the City of Pattaya, Town of Chonburi, Portal town of Laem Chabang and Town of Sattahip on the west coast of Chonburi Province, Thailand	Thailand
The West Yorkshire Built-up Area consists of the cities of Leeds, Bradford and Wakefield, and the large town of Huddersfield, United Kingdom.	United Kingdom
The Florence-Muscle Shoals Metropolitan Area in Alabama, is locally referred to as "the Quad Cities", with Florence, Muscle Shoals, Sheffield, and Tuscumbia, Alabama. Formerly, when Muscle Shoals was a mere village, this region was known as "Tri-Cities", Alabama. In fact, all except Florence are incorporated as towns.	United States
Quad Cities of Davenport and Bettendorf, Iowa, and Rock Island and Moline, Illinois. It also includes a fifth member, East Moline, Illinois.	United States
Allentown/Bethlehem, Pennsylvania and Easton, Pennsylvania/Phillipsburg, New Jersey; the collective area is often called the Lehigh Valley	United States
The Quad Cities of Minnesota, consist of Virginia, Eveleth, Gilbert, and Mountain Iron.	United States
The cities of Pullman, Washington, Moscow, Idaho, Lewiston, Idaho and Clarkston, Washington, have marketed themselves as "Quad Cities."	United States

== More than four cities ==
Border towns	Country
The Triangle Region, consisting of Billund, Fredericia, Haderslev, Kolding, Middelfart, Vejen and Vejle.	Denmark
The Ruhr district consisting of Dortmund, Essen, Duisburg, Bochum, Oberhausen, Mülheim, Bottrop, Gelsenkirchen and Herne in its core.	Germany
The cities of New Delhi, Noida, Greater Noida, Ghaziabad, Gurgaon and Faridabad have formed a huge metropolitan area known as National Capital Region (India).	India
The cities of Mumbai, Thane, Navi Mumbai, Kalyan-Dombivli, Mira-Bhayandar, Vasai-Virar, Panvel, Bhiwandi, Ulhasnagar, Ambarnath and Badlapur have formed a huge Mumbai Metropolitan Region.	India
The cities of Kuala Lumpur, Petaling Jaya, Subang Jaya, Puchong, Shah Alam, Klang, Port Klang, Putrajaya, Cyberjaya and Kajang have formed a huge metropolitan area (around the size of Singapore) known as Greater Kuala Lumpur.	Malaysia
The cities of Karaganda, Temirtau, Shakhtinsk, Abai, Saran, Topar, Dolinka, Shahan, Kokpekti, and Novodolinsky form an industrial-mining area known since Soviet times as Karbass (Karaganda coal basin).	Kazakhstan
The cities of Będzin, Bytom, Chorzów, Czeladź, Dąbrowa Górnicza, Gliwice, Jaworzno, Katowice, Knurów, Mikołów, Mysłowice, Piekary Śląskie, Ruda Śląska, Siemianowice Śląskie, Świętochłowice, Sosnowiec, Tychy, Tarnowskie Góry, and Zabrze form the Katowice urban area.	Poland
Illinois and Iowa: The cities of Davenport and Bettendorf in Iowa; Rock Island, Moline and East Moline in Illinois form a metropolitan area known as the Quad Cities.	United States
Michigan and Wisconsin include the 6 cities of Iron Mountain, Kingsford, Quinnesec (in Michigan), Aurora, and Niagara (in Wisconsin). The area is collectively known as the Iron Mountain Area.	United States
Virginia: Norfolk, Chesapeake, Hampton, Newport News, Portsmouth, Suffolk, and Virginia Beach; the cities' collective metropolitan area is often called Hampton Roads	United States

== Unincorporated communities ==
Even unincorporated communities, which are called "cities" in everyday conversation, can be called "twin cities" if they have a neighbor that is also unincorporated, or even a proper city.

=== Examples ===
==== United States ====
Michigan:

- Dorr, Michigan and Moline, Michigan
- Hessel, Michigan and Cedarville, Michigan
- Kinross, Michigan and Kincheloe, Michigan
- Prudenville, Michigan and Houghton Lake, Michigan
- Haslett, Michigan and Okemos, Michigan

North Carolina:

- Rodanthe, North Carolina and Salvo, North Carolina, technically a tri-city area since Waves, North Carolina sits in between those two places.

== Cities sharing services ==
Some nearby cities share certain services.

- Berkley, Michigan and Royal Oak, Michigan both share the 44th district court building for legal proceedings of police citations, even though Berkley has its own police department.

== Examples of cities formed by amalgamation ==
=== Asia ===
China
- Wuhan in China consists of the towns of Wuchang, Hankou, and Hanyang in Hubei Province.
India
- Delhi: What used to be Old Delhi, New Delhi, and a collection of smaller villages has now grown into the current megalopolis that is seen today, also known as the National Capital Region (NCR)
- In Telangana, the cities of Hyderabad and Secunderabad are merged to form Greater Hyderabad.
Japan
- Fukuoka in Japan, a city of 1.4 million people, formerly the twin cities of Hakata and Fukuoka until the late 19th century.
- Kitakyushu in Japan, a city of 900,000 people, created in 1963 by the merger of Yahata, Kokura, Moji, Wakamatsu, and Tobata. Yahata and Kokura had formerly been major cities in their own right.
- Saitama in Japan, a city of 1.2 million people, created in 2001 by the merger of the cities of Urawa, Omiya, Yono, and later Iwatsuki. Urawa and Omiya could formerly have been considered twin cities.
Pakistan
- Islamabad, the capital city of Pakistan, has been expanded to include smaller towns including Rawat in its territory.
- Lahore, the second largest city of Pakistan, has, as of 2013, grown out so much that small towns by this giant city, such as Shahdara, have been absorbed in its city limits.
Philippines
- Manila, the capital city of the Philippines, was reorganized in 1901 by merging several municipalities, including Tondo, Sampaloc, Paco, Pandacan, Ermita, and Malate, into one city when its borders were extended outside the walled city now known as Intramuros.
- Iloilo City, in the Visayas, was expanded to absorb the municipalities of Molo, La Paz, Arevalo, and Mandurriao in 1937 as districts. The nearby city of Jaro was later absorbed in 1941.
Taiwan
- The former cities of Taoyuan and Zhongli, Taiwan, which merged along with the entire county in 2014 to form a single municipality city of Taoyuan, the two cities sit directly next to each other and shares almost the same population.
Thailand
- Bangkok, the capital and largest city of Thailand, was created in 1971, when the previous Bangkok province (Phra Nakhon) was merged with Thonburi province.
Vietnam
- The cities of Saigon and Cholon merged in 1931 to form a single city named Saigon-Cholon; in 1956, the name Cholon was dropped and the city became known as Saigon (now Ho Chi Minh City).
- The city of Hà Đông, capital of Hà Tây Province was merged into Hà Nội upon the latter's amalgamation into Hà Nội in August 2008. Since then, Hà Đông became an urban district (quận) of Hà Nội.

=== Europe ===
Germany
- Berlin (Berlin and Cölln), in Germany
- Duisburg (Duisburg and Hamborn, 1929–1935 called Duisburg-Hamborn), in North Rhine-Westphalia
- Krefeld (Krefeld and Uerdingen, 1929–1940 called Krefeld-Uerdingen), in North Rhine-Westphalia
- Wuppertal (Barmen and Elberfeld), in North Rhine-Westphalia
Greece
- Athens incorporated dozens of villages and towns and absorbed whole of Athens basin and parts outside of it, notably Piraeus.
Hungary
- Budapest, Hungary is the amalgamation of Buda, Pest and Óbuda.
The Netherlands
- Eindhoven, the Netherlands, merged with five neighbouring municipalities (Woensel, Tongelre, Stratum, Gestel en Blaarthem and Strijp) into the new Groot-Eindhoven ("Greater Eindhoven") in 1920. The prefix "Groot-" was later dropped.
Spain
- Madrid, evolved by absorption of other towns (like Tetuán de las Victorias, Vallecas, Chamartín de la Rosa or Aravaca)
United Kingdom
- Edinburgh, Scotland, absorbed a number of surrounding villages, but most notably the separate burgh of Leith.
- London, grew from its cores in the City of London and the City of Westminster to encompass many other towns and villages within neighbouring counties and absorbed almost the whole of Middlesex county.
- Manchester and the city of Salford in the Metropolitan County of Greater Manchester (formerly in Lancashire).
- Stoke-on-Trent was created in 1910 from the towns of Burslem, Hanley, Tunstall, Longton, Fenton and Stoke, taking its name from the latter. Neighbouring Newcastle-under-Lyme remains a separate town.

=== North America ===
Canada
- Port Alberni, British Columbia, Canada, was formed in 1967 when Alberni and Port Alberni, merged to become one city.
- Winnipeg, Manitoba, Canada, amalgamated with 12 surrounding municipalities and its metropolitan corporation in 1971 under what was referred to as unicity reforms in local government restructuring.
- Halifax and Dartmouth, Nova Scotia, Canada, were merged in 1996 along with Bedford and Halifax County to create the Halifax Regional Municipality.
- Greater Sudbury, Ontario, Canada, was formed in 2001 by the amalgamation of the former Regional Municipality of Sudbury, comprising the municipalities of Sudbury, Nickel Centre, Valley East, Capreol, Rayside-Balfour, Onaping Falls and Walden, plus a number of previously unamalgamated townships. The amalgamation made it the most populous city in the Northern Ontario region.
- Kingston, Ontario, Canada, was amalgamated in 1998 with the neighboring Kingston and Pittsburgh Townships.
- Ottawa, Ontario, Canada, was given its large area by the amalgamation in 2001 of the old City of Ottawa, the suburbs of Nepean, Kanata, Gloucester, Rockcliffe Park, Vanier and Cumberland, Orleans, and the rural townships of West Carleton, Osgoode, Rideau, and Goulbourn
- Toronto, Ontario, Canada, formed by an amalgamation of the Old Toronto with East York, Etobicoke, North York, Scarborough and York, which were themselves products of earlier amalgamations.
- Thunder Bay, Ontario, Canada (Fort William and Port Arthur).
- Gatineau, Quebec, Canada, formed by the amalgamation of the old City of Gatineau, City of Hull, City of Aylmer, City of Buckingham and the Municipality of Masson-Angers all facing the City of Ottawa, Ontario from the north shore of the Ottawa River.
- Saguenay, Quebec, Canada (Chicoutimi, Jonquière, et al.)
- Lloydminster, Canada, on the Saskatchewan-Alberta border, was formed as a single entity in 1903, when both future provinces were part of the Northwest Territories, but was divided into two separate entities in 1905 because the border between the newly created provinces bisected the community. In 1930, the two towns were reunited as a single town under the shared jurisdiction of both provinces, and Lloydminster was reincorporated as a single city in 1958.
United States
- Helena–West Helena, Arkansas was formed in 2006 by the merger of the previous cities of Helena and West Helena.
- Fremont, California was formed in 1956 by the combination of the five towns of Centerville, Irvington, Niles, Mission San Jose, and Warm Springs, California. The town of Newark has always refused to merge into Fremont, and Newark is completely surrounded by Fremont.
- Cahokia Heights, Illinois was formed in 2021 when the municipalities of Alorton, Cahokia, and Centreville voted in a 2020 referendum to merge.
- Boston, Massachusetts is made up of the former towns of Boston, Dorchester, Brighton, Roxbury, Charlestown, and Hyde Park.
- Iron River, Michigan absorbed the nearby city of Stambaugh and village of Mineral Hills in July 2000.
- Minneapolis, Minnesota. St. Anthony (not to be confused with St. Anthony Village, a modern city which is a suburb) was a twin city to Minneapolis in the two cities' youth. Minneapolis annexed St. Anthony in the late 1800s.
- Park Hills, Missouri was formed in 1994 by a four-way municipal merger involving the cities of Flat River, Elvins, and Esther, plus the village of Rivermines.
- New York City, New York (five boroughs, historically especially between Manhattan and Brooklyn)
- What is now the city of Winston-Salem, North Carolina was once two separate towns called Winston and Salem that were combined into one. (Note: Nicknamed the Twin City.)
- Cleveland (Cleveland and Ohio City) in Ohio
- Lincoln City, Oregon was formed in 1965 by merging the extant seaside towns of Oceanlake, Delake, and Taft, with the adjoining unincorporated areas of Nelscott and Cutler City.
- Bethlehem, Pennsylvania, which absorbed the cities of South Bethlehem, and West Bethlehem. The former Bethlehem and South Bethlehem are situated in Northampton County, and West Bethlehem is in Lehigh County. As a result, present-day Bethlehem straddles the county line.
- Pittsburgh, Pennsylvania, annexed Allegheny City, which is now the quarter of the city that lies north of the Allegheny and Ohio rivers. Also annexed was Birmingham, now referred to as the "South Side".
- Richmond (Richmond and Manchester) in central Virginia
- Bellingham, Washington was formed from four cities, Fairhaven, Sehome, Bellingham and Whatcom.

== Fictional twin cities ==
- Ankh-Morpork, from Terry Pratchett's Discworld novels, is referred to as "the twin cities of proud Ankh and pestilent Morpork"
- Besźel and Ul Qoma in China Miéville's novel The City & the City are intertwined twin city-states in Eastern Europe whose inhabitants have trained themselves to only see the city they live in and unsee the city they don't.
- Central City and Keystone City, from the current Flash comics, are shown as twin cities. Before the 1985-86 miniseries Crisis on Infinite Earths, Central and Keystone are presented as located in the same space but on different parallel Earths.
- Duckburg and St. Canard were depicted in the cartoon Darkwing Duck as sister cities connected by a bridge, very similar to Oakland and San Francisco.
- Gotham City (the home of Batman) and Metropolis (the home of Superman) have sometimes been presented as twin cities, mainly in 1970s and 1980s stories by DC Comics. In stories presenting them as twin cities, Gotham City and Metropolis are located on opposite sides of a large bay (identified as Delaware Bay in 1990's The Atlas of the DC Universe), with both cities linked by the Metro–Narrows Bridge, a suspension bridge resembling New York City's Verrazzano–Narrows Bridge.
- Helium, from the Barsoom series of novels by Edgar Rice Burroughs, consists of the twin cities Greater Helium and Lesser Helium.

== See also ==
- Cross-border town naming
- Ecumenopolis
- List of divided cities
- Megacity
- Megalopolis
- Metropolis
- Sister city
- Transborder agglomeration
