= Uruguayan Portuguese =

Variety of Portuguese language

- português uruguaio
- Native to: North-eastern Uruguay, near Brazilian border
- Ethnicity: Brazilian Uruguayans, Portuguese Uruguayans
- Native speakers: 30,000 (2016)
- Language family: Indo-European: Italic; Latin; Romance; Western; Ibero-Romance; West Iberian; Galician-Portuguese; Portuguese; Uruguayan Portuguese
- Writing system: Latin (Portuguese alphabet); Portuguese Braille

Language codes
- ISO 639-3: –
- Glottolog: None
- Linguasphere: 51-AAA-am
- IETF: pt-UY

Uruguayan Portuguese (português uruguaio, [poɾtuˈɣes uɾuˈɣwajo]), also known as fronteiriço ([fɾõteˈɾiso]) and riverense, is a variety of Portuguese in South America with heavy influence from Rioplatense Spanish. It is spoken in north-eastern Uruguay, near the Brazilian border, mainly in the region of the twin cities of Rivera (Uruguay) and Santana do Livramento (Brazil). This section of the frontier is called "Peace Border" (Portuguese: Fronteira da Paz; Spanish: Frontera de la Paz), because there is no legal obstacle to crossing the border between the two countries.

The varieties of Uruguayan Portuguese share many similarities with the countryside dialects of the southern Brazilian state of Rio Grande do Sul, such as the denasalization of final unstressed nasal vowels, replacement of lateral palatal /ʎ/ with semivowel /j/, no raising of final unstressed /e/, alveolar trill /r/ instead of the guttural R, and lateral realization of coda /l/ instead of L-vocalization. The first two features are rare among accents of Portuguese, whereas L-vocalization is the norm in Brazil but not in other countries.

Starting in the late 20th century, changes in Uruguayan Portuguese include the urbanization of this variety, acquiring characteristics from urban Brazilian Portuguese, such as a distinction between /ʎ/ and /j/, affrication of /t/ and /d/ before /i/ and /ĩ/, and other features of Brazilian broadcast media. Uruguayan Portuguese now exists on a spectrum, ranging from working-class rural varieties to middle class urban ones. Middle class Uruguayan Portuguese has undergone heavy convergence to the monolingual Brazilian Portuguese standard, and is perceived by middle class Brazilians to be similar to their own speech.

== History ==
The origin of Portuguese in Uruguay can be traced back to the time of the dominion of the kingdoms of Spain and Portugal, and the Empire of Brazil. In those times, the ownership of those lands was not very well defined, passing back and forth from the hands of one crown to the other. Before its independence after the Cisplatine War in 1828, Uruguay was one of the provinces of the Empire of Brazil as Cisplatina.

Portuguese was the only language spoken throughout northern Uruguay until the end of the 19th century. To assure the homogeneity of the newly formed country, the government made an effort to impose the Spanish language into lusophone communities through educational policies and language planning, and bilingualism became widespread and diglossic. Uruguayan Portuguese is spoken along approximately 1,000 kilometres of border and is most concentrated in paired border cities separated by a street or river, including Rivera–Santana do Livramento, Artigas–Quaraí, and Chuy–Chuí.

== Phonology ==
=== Vowels ===
Uruguayan Portuguese (IPA)	Pronunciation (IPA)	Uruguayan Portuguese	Brazilian Portuguese	English
a	[ˈpapa]	papa	batata	potato
a	[kataˈɾata]	catarata	cachoeira/catarata/queda d'água	waterfall
e	[ˈpeʃe]	peixe	peixe	fish
e	[deterˈχente]	detergente	detergente	detergent
i	[ˈsisko]	cisco	lixo	garbage
i	[ˈniɲo]	ninho	ninho	nest
j	[sja]	cear	jantar/cear	to have dinner
o	[onˈtonte]	anteontem	anteontem	day before yesterday
o	[ˈojo]	olho	olho	eye
o	[ˈposo]	poço	poço	well
u	[ʒuɾuˈɾu]	jururu	triste/melancólico/jururu	sad, melancholic
u	[nu]	no	no	in the (M)
w	[aˈkwa]	acoar	latir/ladrar/acoar	to bark
ɛ	[tɛ]	té	chá	tea
ɛ	[pɛl]	pele	pele	skin
ɛ	[ˈvɛja]	velha	velha	old (F)
ɔ	[fɔˈfɔka]	fofoca	fofoca	gossip
ɔ	[ˈpɔso]	posso	posso	(I) can
ã	[maˈsã]	maçã	maçã	apple
ã	[lã]	lã	lã	wool
ã	[sã]	sã (ADJ)	sã	healthy (F)
ã	[ˈkãʃa]	cancha	quadra esportiva	sports ground
ẽ	[ˈpẽsaw̃]	pensam	pensam	(they) think
ĩ	[ĩˈtõse]	entonces	então	then
õ	[ɡarˈsõ]	garçom	garçom/empregado de mesa	waiter (bar, restaurant)
õ	[tõ]	tom	tom	tone
õ	[ĩˈtõse]	entonces	então	then
ũ	[ũ]	um	um	one (M)
ũ	[kũˈtiɣo]	contigo	contigo	with you
ũ	[niˈɲũa]	nenhuma	nenhuma	no one (F)
w̃	[maw̃]	mão	mão	hand

=== Consonants ===
Consonant phonemes of Uruguayan Portuguese (Tacuaremboense variant)
		Labial	Dental/ Alveolar	Alveo-palatal	Velar
Plosive		p	t		k
Fricative	tense	f	s	ʃ	x
Fricative	lax	b ~ β	d ~ ð		g ~ ɣ
Nasal		m	n	ɲ̟	
Lateral			l		
Trill	tense				r̃
Trill	lax		r		

The variant described above is known as "Tacuaremboense" and is spoken in the interior of Rivera. Stops and tense fricatives can be voiced or voiceless, while the lax fricatives are always voiced. The implosive allophone of /s/ is sibilant, not aspirated.

== See also ==
- Comparison of Portuguese and Spanish
