= Padang Besar =

Padang Besar may refer to:

== Places ==
=== Towns ===
- Padang Besar, Malaysia, a town on the Malaysian side of the Malaysia-Thailand border
- Padang Besar, Thailand, a town on the Thai side of the Malaysia-Thailand border

=== Railway Stations ===
- Padang Besar railway station, a railway station in Padang Besar, Malaysia which is the railway border crossing between Malaysia and Thailand
- Padang Besar (Thai) railway station, a minor railway station in Padang Besar, Thailand

=== Voting district ===
- Padang Besar (federal constituency), a voting district or constituency of the Dewan Rakyat of the Malaysian Parliament

=== Village ===
- Padang Basar, a village in North Amuntai district, North Hulu Sungai regency, South Kalimantan, Indonesia

== Other ==
- Padang Besar, a 2012 Thai film known in English as I Carried You Home
