= Sebastián Puchetta =

Uruguayan footballer (born 1986)

Personal information
- Date of birth: 9 March 1986 (age 40)
- Place of birth: Rivera, Uruguay
- Position: Midfielder

Senior career*
| Years | Team | Apps | (Gls) |
| 2006–2008 | Tacuarembó | | |
| 2008–2009 | Juventud | 24 | (1) |
| 2009–2010 | Compostela | | |
| 2010–2011 | Juventud | | |
- * Club domestic league appearances and goals

Sebastián Puchetta (born 9 March 1986) is an Uruguayan former professional footballer who played as a midfielder. He played on the professional level in Primera División Uruguaya for Tacuarembó F.C. and Juventud de Las Piedras.
