= Luiz Nunes =

Brazilian footballer

Personal information
- Full name: Luiz Fernando Nunes Duarte
- Date of birth: 4 December 1980 (age 45)
- Place of birth: Santana do Livramento, Brazil
- Height: 1.81 m (5 ft 11 in)
- Position: Centre-back

Senior career*
| Years | Team | Apps | (Gls) |
| 1999 | Juventude | 0 | (0) |
| 2000–2001 | River Plate | 0 | (0) |
| 2001–2007 | Peñarol | 83 | (5) |
| 2007–2008 | Juventude | 15 | (1) |
| 2008–2011 | Académica | 49 | (1) |
- * Club domestic league appearances and goals

Luiz Fernando Nunes Duarte (born 4 December 1980) is a Brazilian former professional footballer who played as a centre-back in Uruguay for Peñarol, in Brazil for Juventude and in Portugal for Académica.
