= Rivera International Airport =

Rivera International Airport President General Óscar D. Gestido Binational Airport
- IATA: RVY; ICAO: SURV; LID: AD2.13

Summary
- Airport type: Public
- Operator: Aeropuertos Uruguay
- Serves: Rivera, Uruguay; Santana do Livramento, Brazil
- Location: Rivera, Uruguay
- Opened: 16 June 1979; 47 years ago
- Elevation AMSL: 712 ft (217 m)
- Coordinates: 30°58′10″S 55°28′24″W

Map
- Location in Uruguay

Runways
Direction	Length		Surface
Direction	m	ft	Surface
05/23	1,830	6,004	Asphalt
- Sources: SkyVector, GCM

Rivera International Airport, officially known as President General Óscar D. Gestido Binational Airport (IATA: RVY, ICAO: SURV), and formerly Cerro Chapeu International Airport, is an airport serving Rivera in the Rivera Department of Uruguay and the neighboring Brazilian city of Santana do Livramento. It is operated by Aeropuertos Uruguay, and is named after former Uruguayan president Óscar Diego Gestido.

== Location ==
The airport is located in Rivera in the Rivera Department in the coastal region of Uruguay. The airport is located approximately 7 mi (11 km) from Rivera, close to the Brazilian town of Santana do Livramento across the border.

== History ==
The airport is named after Óscar Diego Gestido, former President of Uruguay. In January 2023, an announcement was made to declare the airport as binational following a meeting between Uruguayan president Lacalle Pou and Brazilian president Luiz Inácio Lula da Silva at Montevideo. In August 2023, the airport was declared as a binational airport after an agreement was signed between the governments of Uruguay and Brazil, making it the first binational airport in Latin America and second in the world. The binational status allowed flights operating between Brazilian airports to be treated as domestic flights at the airport, thereby reducing the statutory levies and facilitating the movement of passengers and cargo between the two countries.

In 2023, the airport underwent modernization at an estimated cost of US$ 13 million. It was part of the planned modernization programme to upgrade six airports in Uruguay. The programme included the modernisation and expansion of the passenger terminal, improvements to the control tower, installation of new communications equipment, repaving of the main runway, installation of new lighting on the runway and taxiways, and addition of new buildings for fire and police. The renovated airport was inaugurated by Uruguayan president Luis Lacalle Pou on 11 December 2023, in the presence of Uruguayan ministers and Brazilian officials including the Brazilian minister of foreign affairs Mauro Vieira, minister of ports and airports Silvio Costa Filho, and Eduardo Leite, the Governor of Rio Grande do Sul.

== Infrastructure ==
The airport has a single 1,830 m (6,000 ft)-long paved runway. The main runway was repaved, and equipped with new lighting during the renovation in 2024. The new passenger terminal was added in 2023. It is one of the eight airports in the country that is managed by Aeropuertos Uruguay.

== See also ==
- Transport in Uruguay
- List of airports in Uruguay
- List of airports in Brazil
