= Peace Border =

International border between Brazil and Uruguay

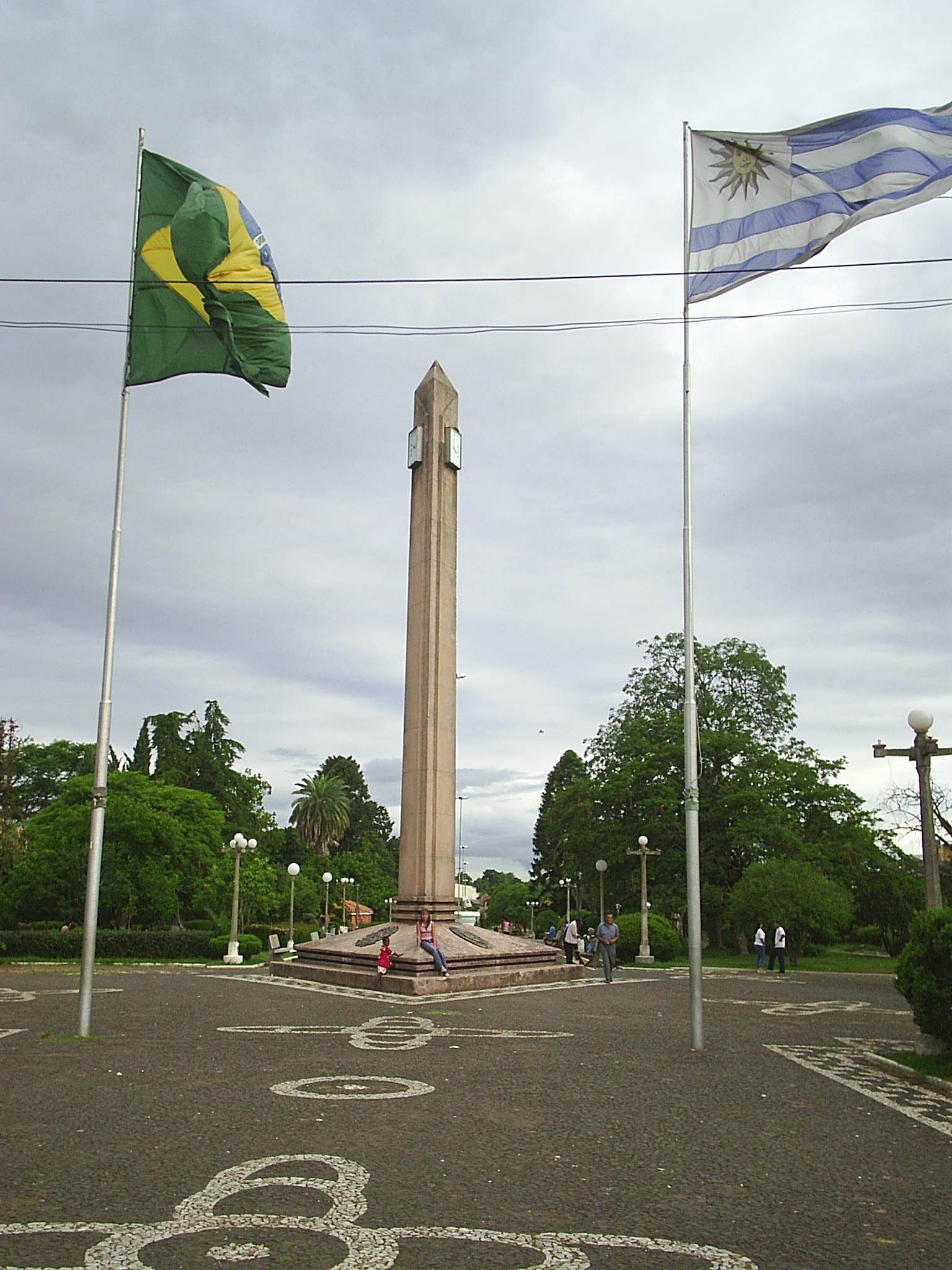
A symbol from the Peace Border: The obelisk in the International Square. To the left, Brazilian territory; to the right, Uruguayan territory.

The Peace Border (Portuguese: Fronteira da Paz; Spanish: Frontera de la Paz) is a portion of the Brazilian-Uruguayan land border, that includes the twin cities of Rivera (Uruguay) and Santana do Livramento (Brazil). The border is so named because of the peaceful cultural interaction of both nationalities, leading to the integration of the two communities. The border is over land, united by a common square, with an imaginary line running through streets, avenues and some marked spots. Both cities have a total population of 169,196 inhabitants.

== Praça Internacional ==
The Praça/Plaza Internacional (International Square), the only binational square in the world, is sovereignly shared between the two nations in equal parts. It was inaugurated on February 26, 1943, by the heads of state of both Brazil and Uruguay, respectively Getúlio Vargas and Alfredo Baldomir.
