= Padang Basar =

- Village
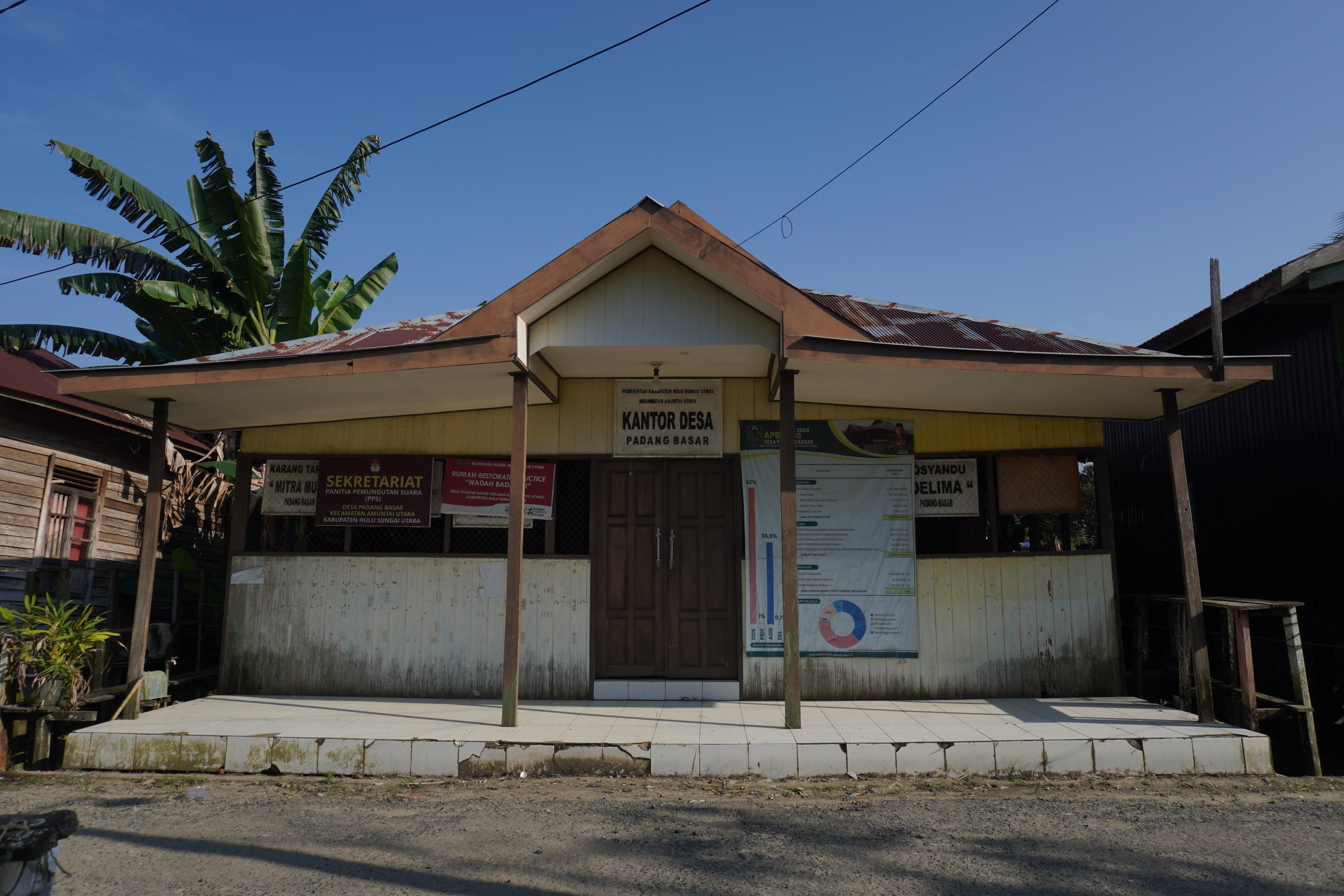
- Padang Basar Village Office
- Interactive map of Padang Basar
- Country: Indonesia
- Province: South Kalimantan
- Regency: North Hulu Sungai
- District: North Amuntai

Padang Basar (Padang Basar Hulu) is one of the villages located in North Amuntai District, North Hulu Sungai Regency, South Kalimantan Province.
