= Rivera =

- Capital city
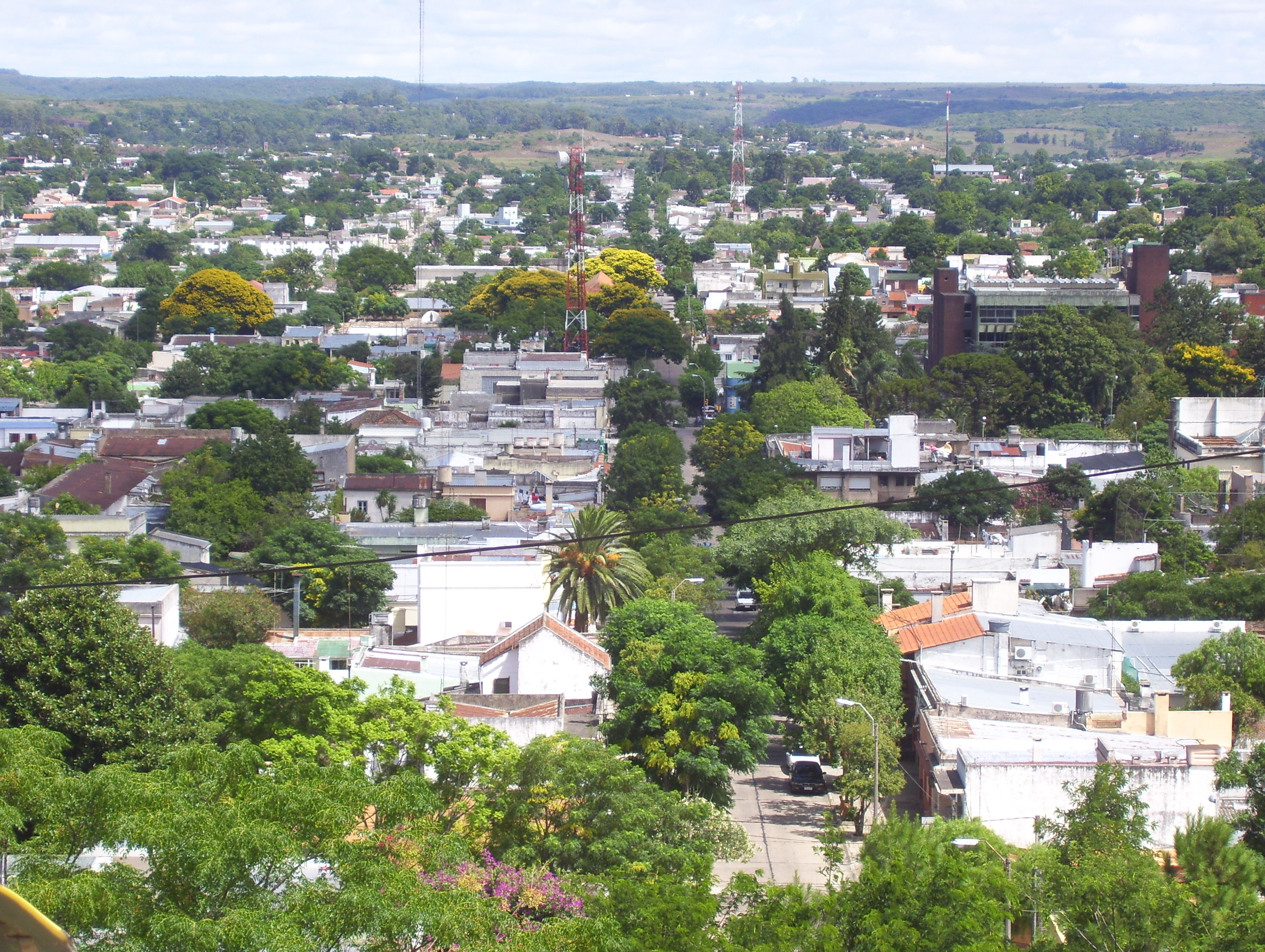
- View of Rivera from Cerro Marconi

- Location in Uruguay
- Coordinates: 30°54′9″S 55°33′2″W
- Country: Uruguay
- Department: Rivera

Area
  - Total: 39.9 km^{2} (15.4 sq mi)
- Elevation: 219 m (719 ft)

Population (2023 Census)
  - Total: 84,775
  - Density: 2,120/km^{2} (5,500/sq mi)
  - Demonym: Riverense
- Time zone: UTC−03:00 (UYT)
- Postal code: 40000
- Dial plan: 462 (+5 digits)
- Website: www.rivera.gub.uy

Rivera (Spanish pronunciation: [riˈβeɾa]) is the capital of Rivera Department of Uruguay. The border with Brazil joins it with the Brazilian city of Santana do Livramento, which is only a block away from it, at the north end of Route 5. Together, they form an urban area of around 200,000 inhabitants. As of the census of 2011, it is the sixth most populated city of Uruguay.

== History ==
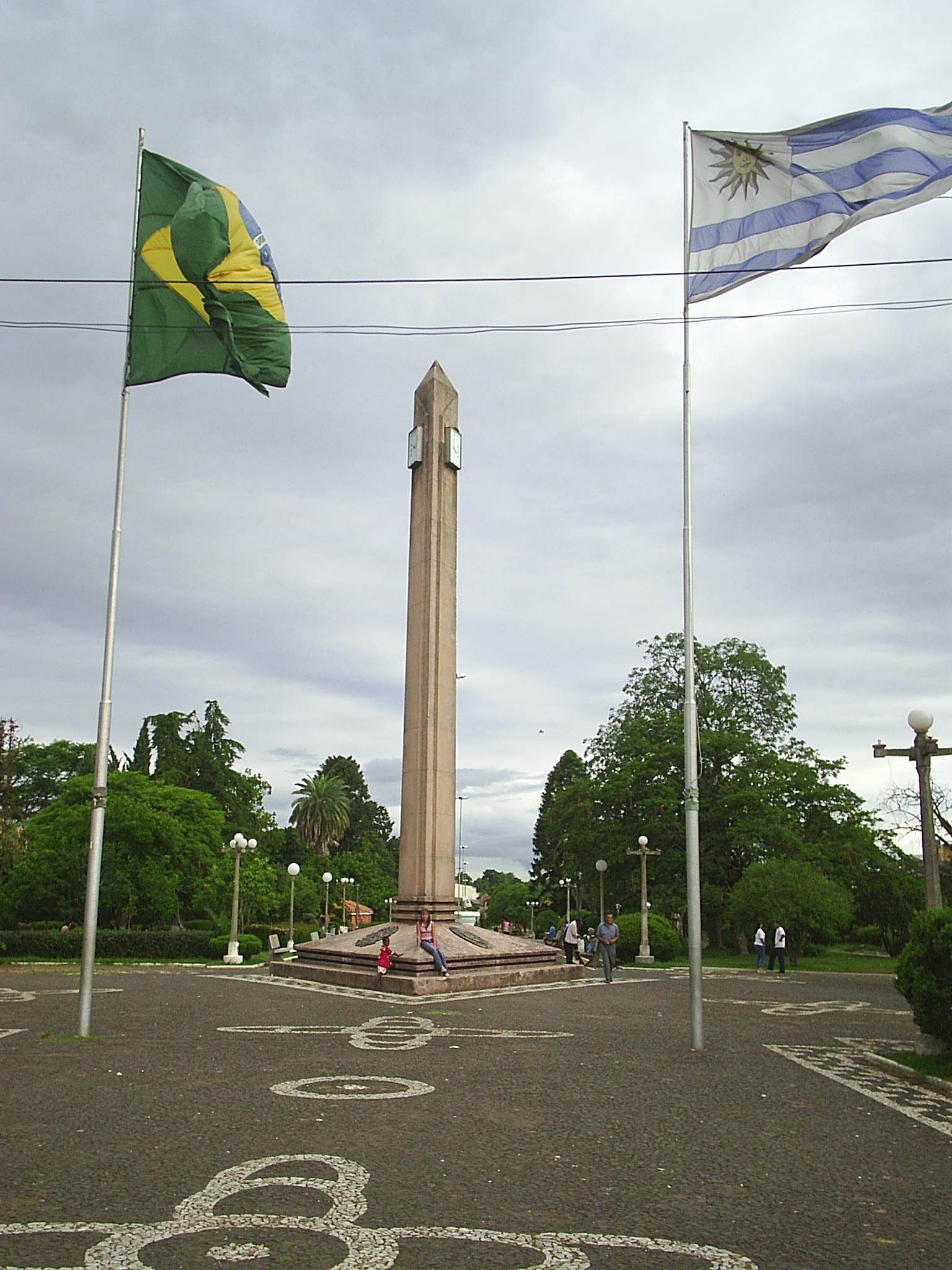
Obelisk of the Plaza Internacional, at the "Frontera de la Paz", between the cities of Rivera (Uruguay) and Santana do Livramento (Brazil).

On 21 March 1860 a pueblo (village) named Pereira was created by the Act of Ley Nº 614.

On 7 May 1862, it was substituted by the villa (town) named Ceballos and founded by the Act of Ley Nº 704, in honour of the Spanish viceroy Pedro de Cevallos. In July 1867 it took on the official name Rivera and was recognized as a villa. The Brazilian town Santana do Livramento already existed just across the border. On 1 October 1884, it became capital of the Department of Rivera by the Act of Ley Nº 1.757. Its status was elevated to ciudad (city) on 10 June 1912 by the Act of Ley Nº 4.006.

In 1943, the Plaza Internacional Rivera-Livramento (see photo) was built to celebrate the Fifth Conference of the Commission Mixta for Mixed Limits and as a hope for the future integration of the two towns, claimed to be the only international square in the world. From 1851 to this day, inhabitants of both communities are free to move in both sides. Today, duty-free shops are one of the main economic resources of Rivera.

The first inhabitants of the city were Spaniards, Italians, Portuguese and some Brazilians immigrants who lived in Santana do Livramento, on the Brazilian side of the border.

== Border control ==
The two cities of Rivera (Uruguay) and Santana do Livramento (Brazil) maintain an open border without any physical border barriers or checkpoints. Inhabitants of the twin cities are free to move anywhere within the two communities without having to undergo checks.

Travellers crossing the border here and proceeding further into the other country are required to complete border formalities at an integrated border control post located at Siñeriz Shopping in Rivera. The integrated border control post housing the immigration and customs offices of both countries was inaugurated on 28 December 2016. Previously, travellers had to visit various offices located in different parts of the twin cities.

== Economy ==
One of the main economic activities of the city of Rivera is the duty free stores. These are aimed at Brazilian neighbors, mainly coming from the cities of Rio Grande do Sul, near the border with Uruguay. The close proximity of Rivera makes it a popular destination for buying imported dollar products. With the fall in the price of the US currency, many devices can be bought for prices up to 40% less than similar ones sold in Brazil. The Rivera shopping limit is $300 per person. Purchases above this amount must be declared at the Federal Revenue Office for the payment of the corresponding import tax so that the product can legally enter Brazil.

There is also a casino, located on one of the avenues where the border between the two countries runs. Within the department, livestock farming, agriculture and afforestation predominate.

== Population ==
In 2023, Rivera had a population of 84,775

Year	Population
1867	341
1889	1,000
1908	8,986
1963	41,266
1975	48,780
1985	57,314
1996	62,859
2004	64,426
2011	64,465
2023	84,775

Source: National Statistics Institute

Many residents of Rivera speak Uruguayan Portuguese, a variety of Portuguese influenced by Uruguayan Spanish.

== Geography ==
=== Climate ===
The climate in Rivera, as well as in Santana do Livramento, is humid subtropical (Cfa, according to the Köppen climate classification), temperate in the winter and relatively hot in the summer.

Climate data for Rivera, Uruguay (1991–2020, extremes 1944–present)
Month	Jan	Feb	Mar	Apr	May	Jun	Jul	Aug	Sep	Oct	Nov	Dec	Year
Record high °C (°F)	41.4 (106.5)	44.0 (111.2)	40.0 (104.0)	36.6 (97.9)	31.2 (88.2)	30.2 (86.4)	30.8 (87.4)	33.6 (92.5)	36.1 (97.0)	36.4 (97.5)	41.5 (106.7)	43.0 (109.4)	44.0 (111.2)
Mean daily maximum °C (°F)	30.7 (87.3)	29.5 (85.1)	27.9 (82.2)	24.2 (75.6)	20.0 (68.0)	17.7 (63.9)	17.2 (63.0)	19.9 (67.8)	21.0 (69.8)	23.8 (74.8)	27.1 (80.8)	29.7 (85.5)	24.1 (75.4)
Daily mean °C (°F)	24.7 (76.5)	23.9 (75.0)	22.3 (72.1)	19.0 (66.2)	15.3 (59.5)	13.2 (55.8)	12.5 (54.5)	14.6 (58.3)	15.7 (60.3)	18.5 (65.3)	21.1 (70.0)	23.6 (74.5)	18.7 (65.7)
Mean daily minimum °C (°F)	18.8 (65.8)	18.3 (64.9)	16.7 (62.1)	13.7 (56.7)	10.7 (51.3)	8.7 (47.7)	7.8 (46.0)	9.2 (48.6)	10.5 (50.9)	13.2 (55.8)	15.1 (59.2)	17.4 (63.3)	13.3 (55.9)
Record low °C (°F)	6.0 (42.8)	7.0 (44.6)	5.0 (41.0)	−3.6 (25.5)	−1.0 (30.2)	−5.0 (23.0)	−4.8 (23.4)	−3.0 (26.6)	−2.4 (27.7)	0.4 (32.7)	4.0 (39.2)	6.4 (43.5)	−5.0 (23.0)
Average precipitation mm (inches)	134.9 (5.31)	148.3 (5.84)	112.2 (4.42)	180.3 (7.10)	147.0 (5.79)	103.0 (4.06)	100.7 (3.96)	94.3 (3.71)	128.0 (5.04)	165.9 (6.53)	123.8 (4.87)	144.5 (5.69)	1,582.9 (62.32)
Average precipitation days (≥ 1.0 mm)	8	8	6	8	7	7	7	6	8	8	6	7	86
Average relative humidity (%)	65	69	72	76	78	79	77	72	72	71	68	64	72
Mean monthly sunshine hours	265.1	222.3	225.4	181.6	161.1	135.6	161.5	184.2	180.1	209.3	245.4	261.7	2,433.3
Source 1: Instituto Uruguayo de Metereología
Source 2: NOAA (precipitation and sun 1991–2020), Instituto Nacional de Investigación Agropecuaria (humidity 1980–2009)

== Places of worship ==
- Church of the Immaculate Conception (Roman Catholic)
- Parish Church of St. Dominic (Roman Catholic)
- Parish Church of the Sacred Heart (Roman Catholic)
- St. Peter Parish Church (Roman Catholic)

== Consular representation ==
Brazil has a Consulate-Geral in Rivera, located at 1169 calle Don Pedro de Ceballos.

== Notable people ==
- Ronald Araújo, professional footballer for Liverpool F.C., was born in Rivera.
- Luiz Eduardo Garagorri, professional mixed martial artist, currently signed for UFC.
- Aparicio Méndez, from Rivera, was President of Uruguay from 1976 to 1981. He was never elected democratically and was chosen by the military dictatorship.
- Rodrigo Mora, professional footballer for Club Atlético River Plate, was born in Rivera.
- Sebastián Puchetta, professional footballer, born in Rivera.

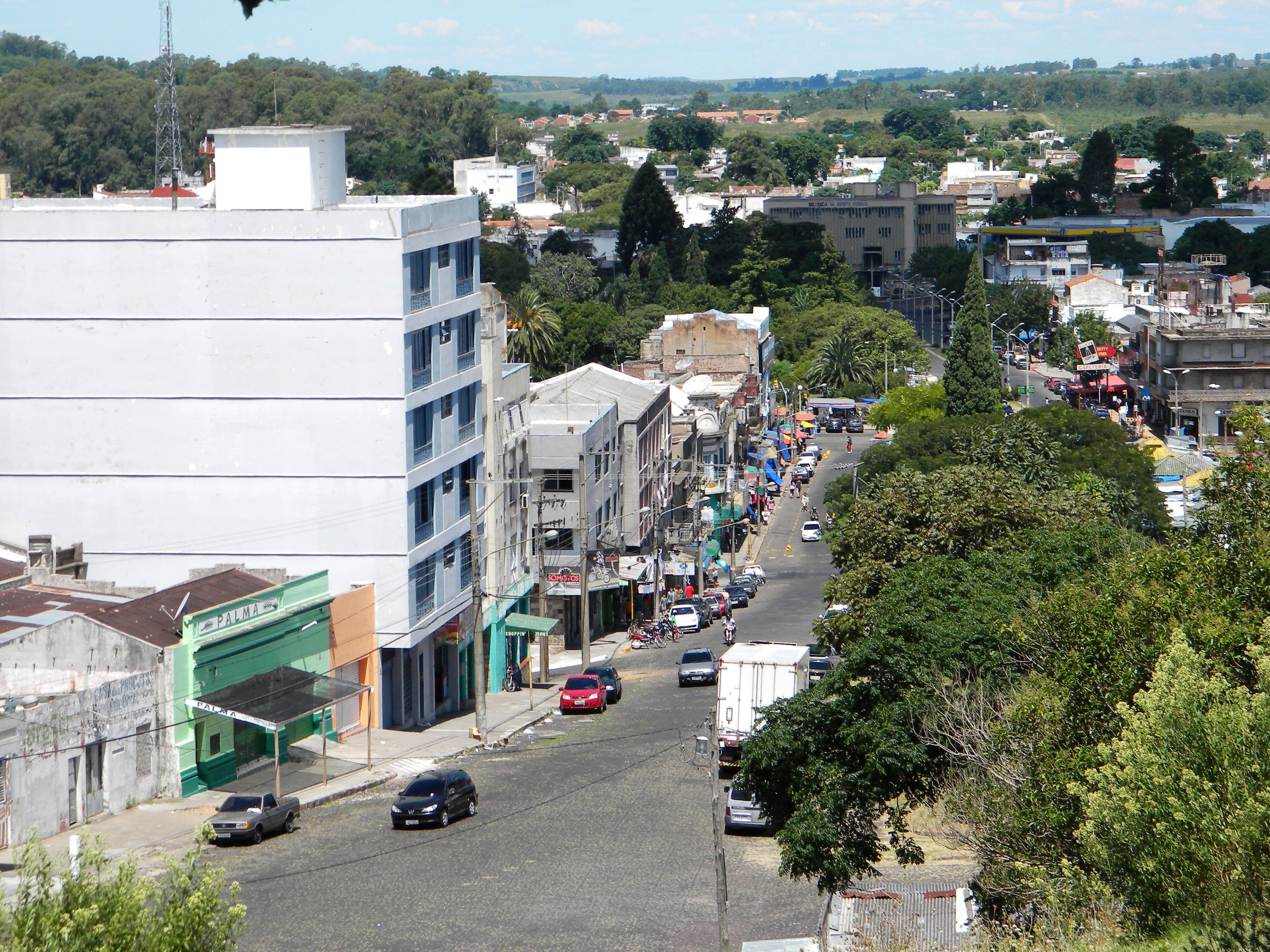
Main street of Rivera

- Alan Saldivia

== Transportation ==
There are regular bus services to Montevideo. A rail service to Tacuarembó has been run intermittently.

Rivera is served by Pres. Gral. Óscar D. Gestido International Airport. On August 14, 2023 Uruguay and Brazil signed an agreement to internationalize the airport. According to this agreement, as a binational facility, flights originated in Brazil are treated as domestic, even though the facility is in Uruguayan territory.

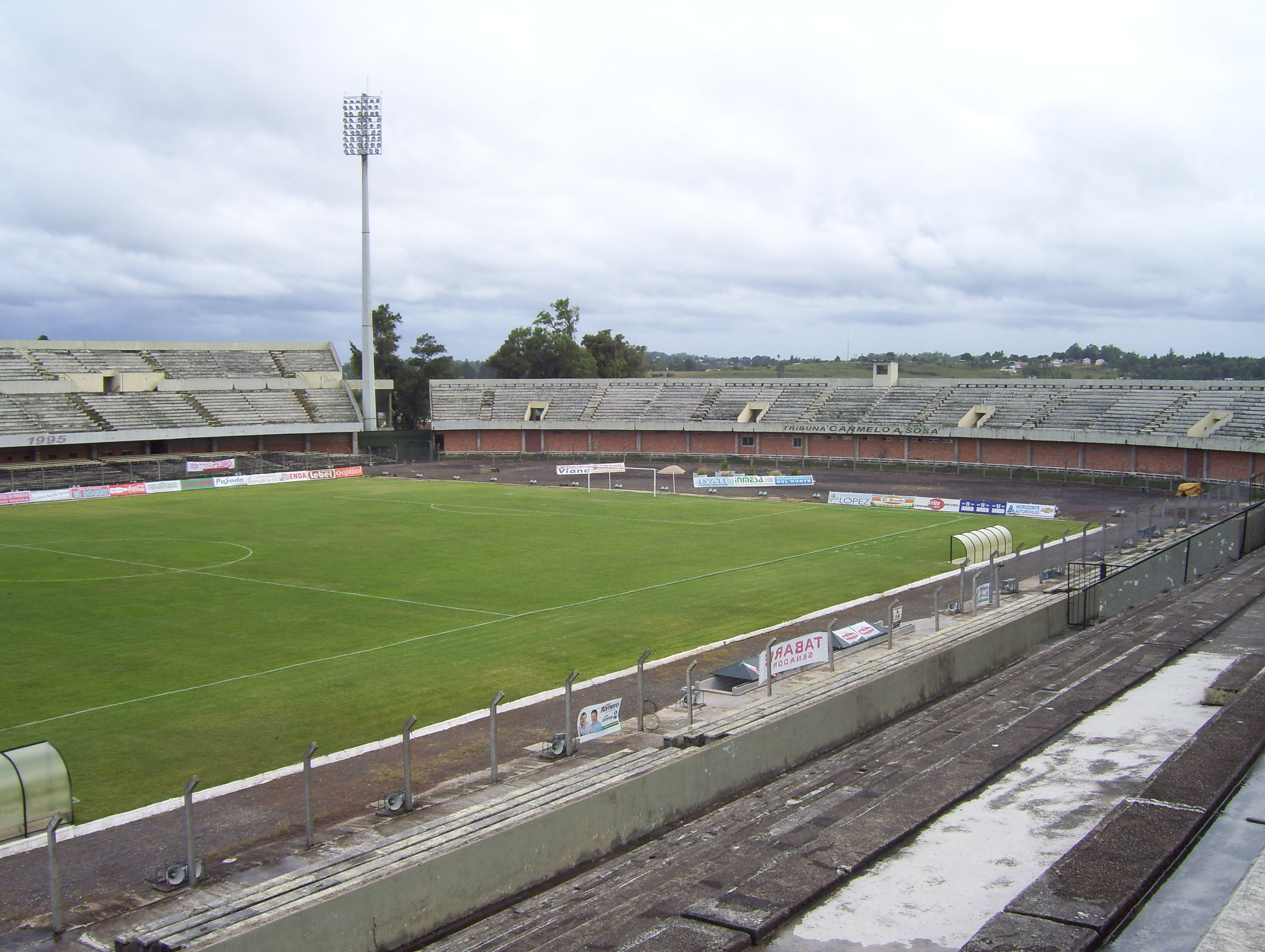
Atilio Paiva Olivera municipal stadium

== Sports ==
The Estadio Atilio Paiva Olivera holds 27,115 people and was used in the 1995 Copa América.

The Skatepark of Rivera is on Presidente Viera Street.

== Twin towns – sister cities ==
Rivera is twinned with:

- Santana do Livramento, Rio Grande do Sul, Brazil
- Uruguaiana, Rio Grande do Sul, Brazil

== See also ==
- Rivera Department
- List of diplomatic missions in Uruguay#Consulate-General in Rivera
- Rivera HVDC Back-to-back station
