= Santana do Livramento =

Municipality of Rio Grande do Sul, Brazil

- Municipality
- Municipality of Santana do Livramento
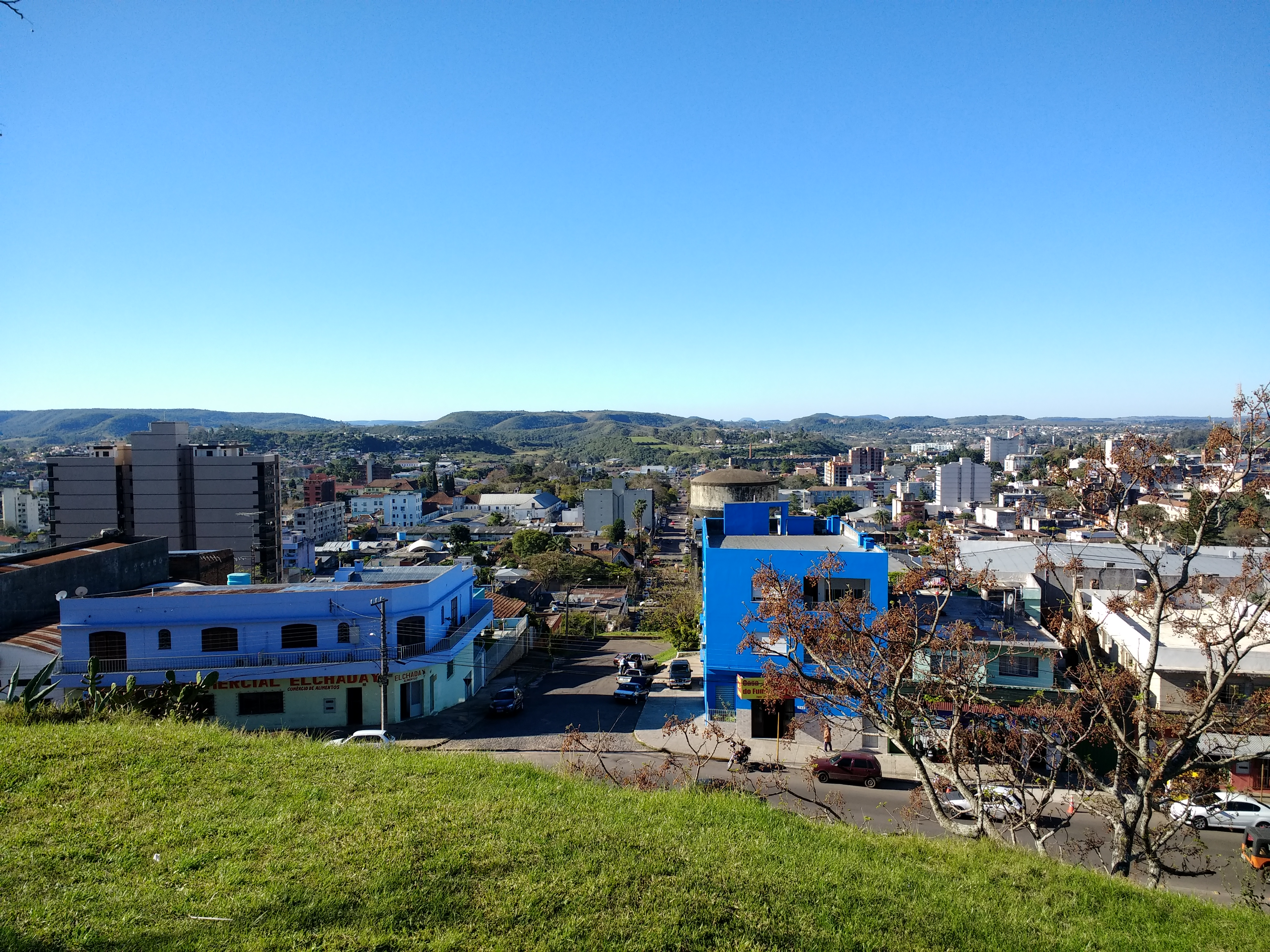

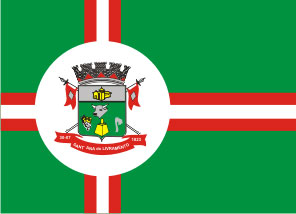
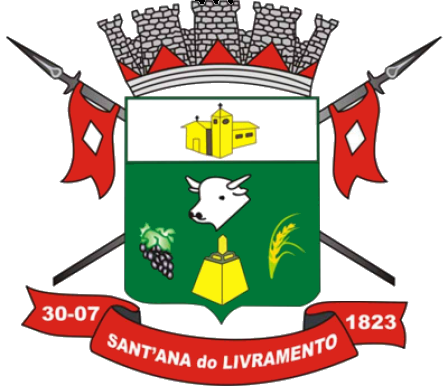
- Flag Coat of arms
- Nicknames: Livramento (Deliverance); Fronteira da Paz (Border of Peace)
- Location of Santana do Livramento
- Coordinates: 30°52′39″S 55°31′59″W
- Country: Brazil
- Region: South
- State: Rio Grande do Sul
- Founded: 30 July 1823

Government
  - Mayor: Ana Luiza Moura Tarouco (PL)

Area
  - Total: 6,950.370 km^{2} (2,683.553 sq mi)
- Elevation: 208 m (682 ft)

Population (2020)
  - Total: 76,321
  - Density: 11.86/km^{2} (30.7/sq mi)
- Time zone: UTC−3 (BRT)
- Area code: +55 (55)
- Language: Portuguese(Official), Uruguayan Portuguese/(Commonly spoken)
- Website: Santana do Livramento

Santana do Livramento, also spelled Sant'Ana do Livramento, is a city in the state of Rio Grande do Sul, Brazil. It is located along the border with the city of Rivera, Uruguay, forming together an international city of almost 170,000 inhabitants. Santana do Livramento was founded on 30 July 1823, and in 1857 was emancipated from Alegrete as a city. In 2009, the city was officially declared by the Brazilian government as the symbolic city of Brazilian integration with the Mercosur member states.

== History ==
The first known occupants of the region of the current municipality were the Charrúa and minuane indigenous. Then came Spanish Jesuits, then throughout the 19th century came Portuguese and Italian immigrants. In 1810, the political instability that would lead to the independence of the Spanish colonies in the Platina Basin led to the arrival of Portuguese troops to the region, in order take advantage of the opportunity and extend their empire in areas of temperate weather so coveted by them. These troops, commanded by Diogo de Sousa, Count of Rio Pardo, founded the present city of Santana do Livramento, through the construction of a chapel dedicated to the homonymous saint. The permanent Portuguese settlement of the region began with the donation of sesmarias made by the Marquês of Alegrete in 1814. Founded the city on 30 July 1823, it was elevated to the category of municipality in 1857, emancipating itself from Alegrete.

The city went through periods of great prosperity, when large woolen mills, refrigerators, social organizations, and soccer clubs were emerging. Slowly, the economy has been fading for many reasons, among which can be cited: isolation (distance from other economic centers), centralist vision (in politics, industry, commerce, territorial organization), and an economic focus on agriculture and trade without emphasis on industrial development, which could have played a vital role as a "bridge" between those activities.

In 1912, the city started the first train station in Brazil with international traffic, between Santana do Livramento and Rivera, Uruguay, with trains connecting Rio de Janeiro and São Paulo to Montevideo and Buenos Aires. Currently, the international train route is disabled.

The area of the municipality located between the Quaraí River and the Arroio Invernada (called the Rincão de Artigas) has been claimed by the government of Uruguay since 1934.

== Geography ==
Santana do Livramento is 208 meters above sea level, and is 498 km (309 mi) from its capital city (Porto Alegre). Livramento shares more than Uruguay. Santana do Livramento is located on the Brazilian border with Uruguay, where they share around 100 km of border. On the other side of the land divide (an urban street), is the Uruguayan city of Rivera. It is one of the oldest municipalities, and the second largest in the territorial extension of the state of Rio Grande do Sul. The border community is unusual in that the two cities maintain an open border without any physical border barriers. Inhabitants from both Livramento (Brazil) and Rivera (Uruguay) are free to move anywhere throughout the twin city community. It is easy for one to get lost in the suburbs and not know whether they are in Brazil or Uruguay.

Travellers crossing the border here and proceeding further into the other country are required to complete border formalities at an integrated border control post located at Siñeriz Shopping in Rivera. The integrated border control post housing the immigration and customs offices of both countries was inaugurated on 28 December 2016. Previously, travellers had to visit various offices located in different parts of the twin cities.

Ibirapuitã Park, on BR 293, lies about ten kilometers from the city.

=== Climate ===
The climate in Santana do Livramento is humid subtropical (Cfa, according to the Köppen climate classification). The temperature is mild in winter and hot in summer.

The warmest month is January, with an average temperature of 24.9 °C (76.8 °F), while the coldest month is July, with an average of 12.5 °C (54.5 °F). The average annual temperature is 18.4 °C (65.1 °F) and the average annual rainfall is 1,467 millimetres (57.8 in).

Climate data for Santana do Livramento (1981–2010)
Month	Jan	Feb	Mar	Apr	May	Jun	Jul	Aug	Sep	Oct	Nov	Dec	Year
Mean daily maximum °C (°F)	30.4 (86.7)	29.2 (84.6)	27.5 (81.5)	24.1 (75.4)	19.8 (67.6)	17.1 (62.8)	17.0 (62.6)	18.4 (65.1)	19.7 (67.5)	23.5 (74.3)	26.1 (79.0)	28.6 (83.5)	23.5 (74.3)
Mean daily minimum °C (°F)	18.2 (64.8)	18.1 (64.6)	16.8 (62.2)	13.8 (56.8)	10.7 (51.3)	8.3 (46.9)	7.7 (45.9)	8.3 (46.9)	9.5 (49.1)	12.5 (54.5)	14.7 (58.5)	16.8 (62.2)	13.0 (55.4)
Average precipitation mm (inches)	94.2 (3.71)	170.9 (6.73)	122.5 (4.82)	138.8 (5.46)	144.3 (5.68)	115.1 (4.53)	108.4 (4.27)	98.9 (3.89)	144.4 (5.69)	129.6 (5.10)	123.9 (4.88)	127.3 (5.01)	1,518.3 (59.78)
Average relative humidity (%)	66.4	71.8	74.3	76.6	82.9	85.5	82.3	79.2	78.6	74.4	70.2	67.1	75.8
Mean monthly sunshine hours	273.7	214.2	222.9	180.1	140.5	115.5	153.5	171.0	178.5	219.1	235.3	262.4	2,366.7
Source: Instituto Nacional de Meteorologia

== Demographics ==
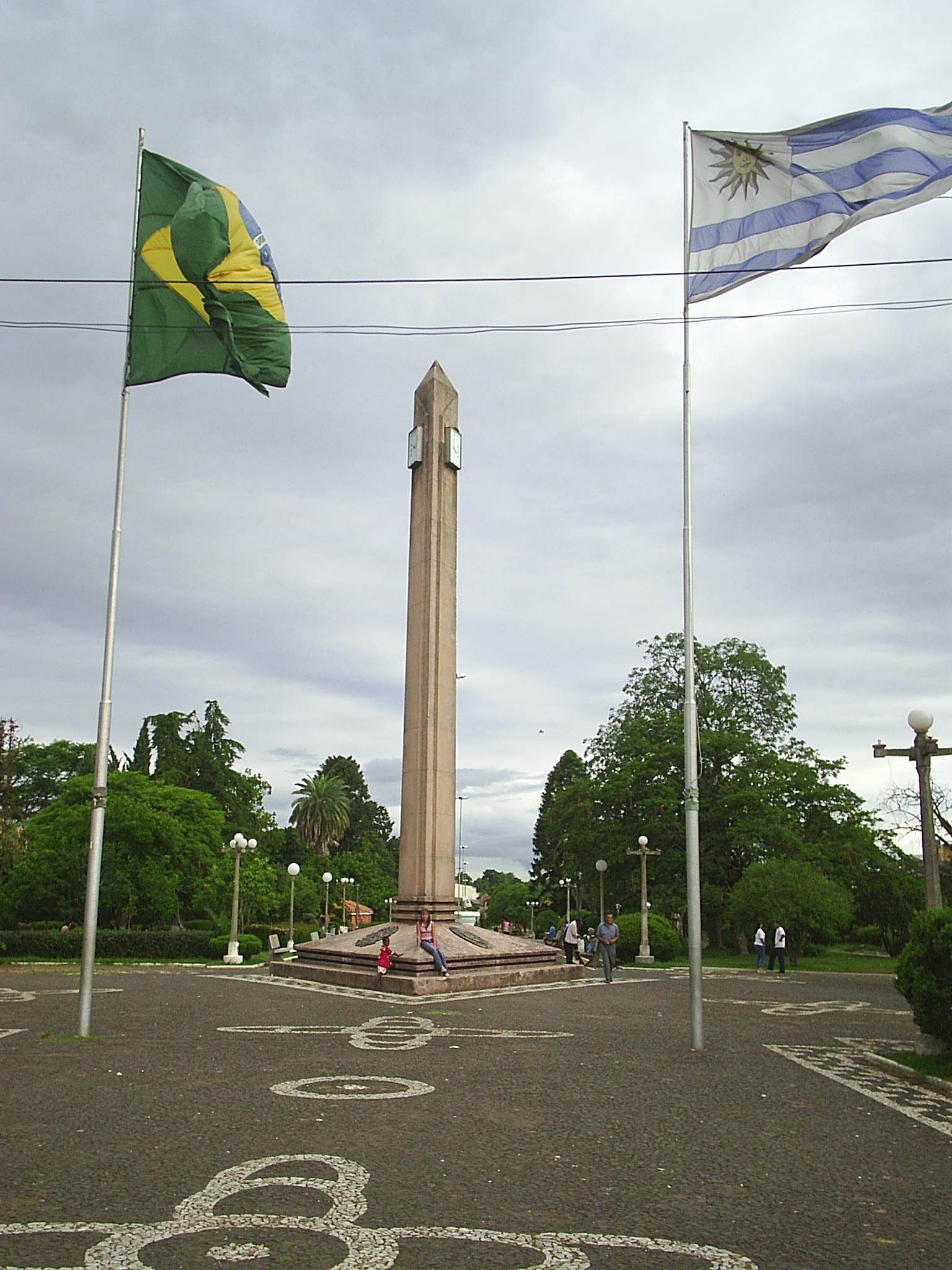
Obelisk of the International Square, at the Fronteira da Paz, cities of Santana do Livramento (Brazil) and Rivera (Uruguay)

The population in 2020 was 76,321 inhabitants in an area of 6,950.37 km^{2} (2,683.55 sq mi).

=== Religion ===
The majority of the population declares themselves Roman Catholic. However, in the last few years there has been a great increase in the number of Protestants in the Pentecostal and traditional aspects, especially in: Assembleia de Deus Church, Metodista Wesleyana Church, Evangelho Quadrangular Church, Deus é Amor, Batista Nacional Church, Internacional da Graça de Deus Church, Congregação Cristã no Brasil, among others.

Other lines, also present that are part of Brazilian religiosity: Umbanda and Spiritism by Allan Kardec. Within the plurality of Brazil, Santana do Livramento also have small groups of other creeds as Muslims, originating from countries of the Middle East and Hindus, coming from India.

== Economy ==
The economy of the city is mainly based on farming, cattle, leather goods and viticulture. The city crosses the 31st parallel, making it an ideal area for wine production. The two main wineries are Almaden and Santa Colina. Tourism also plays a role in city's economy, as many tourists come to Livramento to visit the duty-free shops in its neighboring city Rivera.

Rural tourism is also an attractive option in Santana do Livramento. The city hosts an international kite fair and a festival of lamb and wine. On 20 September the gaúchos commemorate the Ragamuffin War.

== Education ==
Santana do Livramento has seven higher education institutions, three of which are private: University of the Campanha Region, Paulista/Cultural University and Castelo Branco/Exattus University (the last two, distance learning).

The public ones are: State University of Rio Grande do Sul, Federal University of Santa Maria, Open University of Brazil and Federal University of Pampa.

== Notable people ==
- Luiz Nunes (born 1980), footballer

== Consular representation ==
Uruguay has a Consulate in Santana do Livramento.

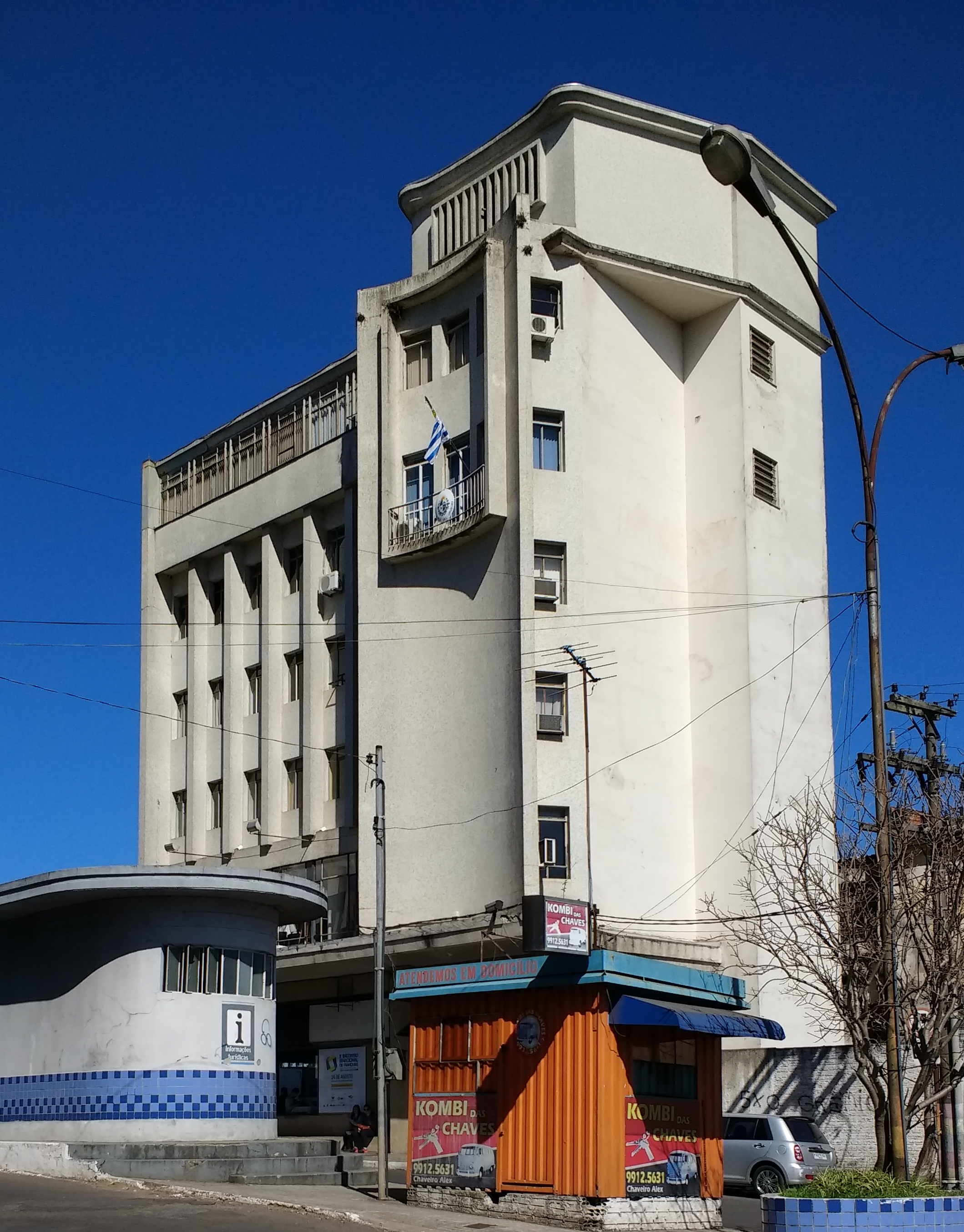
Consulate of Uruguay

== Transport ==
There is a break of gauge station where the railways of Brazil and Uruguay meet.

Even though Santana do Livramento has an aerodrome, since 14 August 2023, scheduled flights to Santana do Livramento operate at Pres. Gral. Óscar D. Gestido International Airport in neighboring Rivera, Uruguay. This airport is a binational facility, serving both Brazil and Uruguay. Even though it is located in Uruguayan territory, flights originated in Brazil are considered to be domestic.

== See also ==
- List of municipalities in Rio Grande do Sul
