= Inácio Montanha =

Brazilian Educator

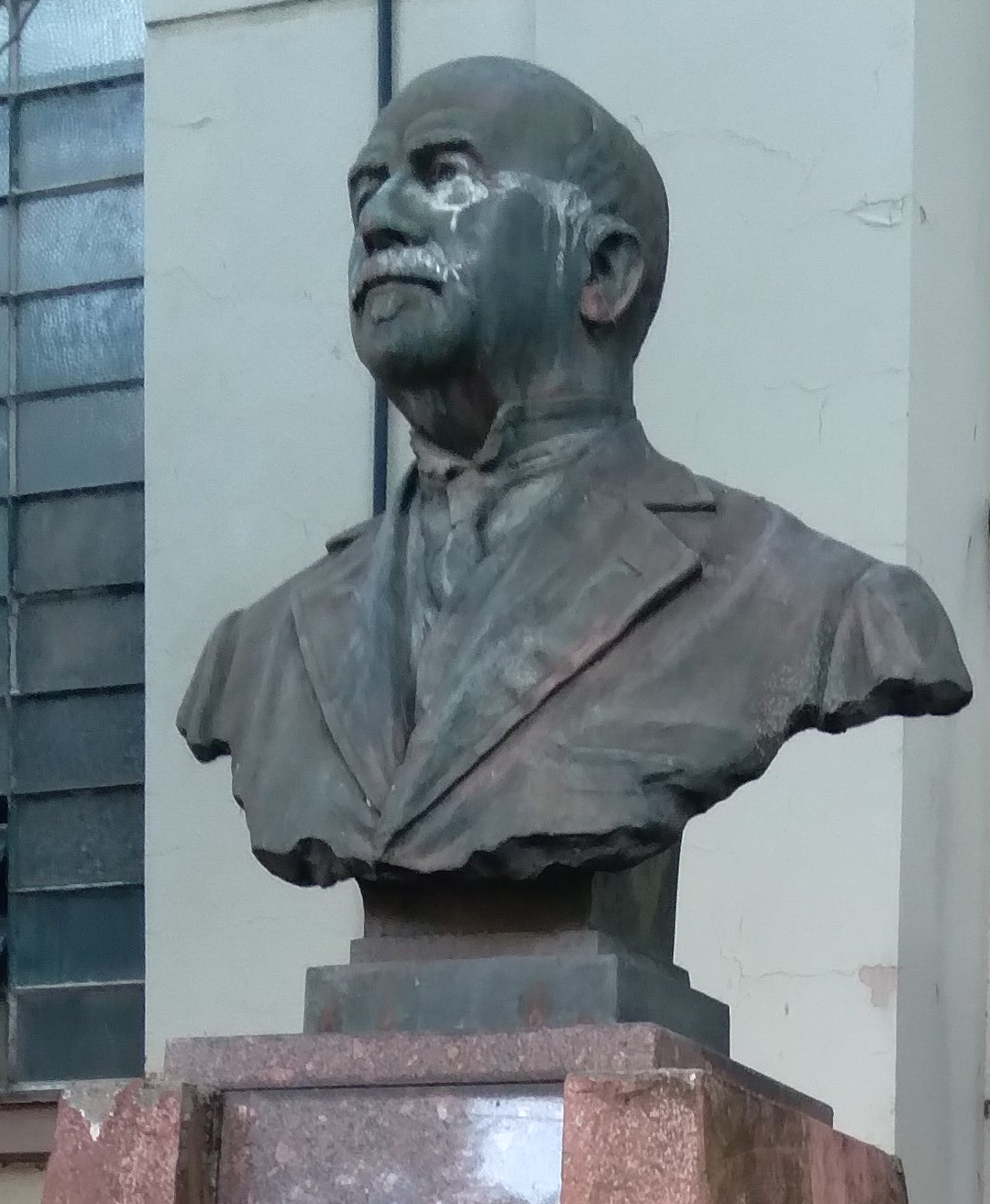
Bust of Inácio Montanha in Porto Alegre

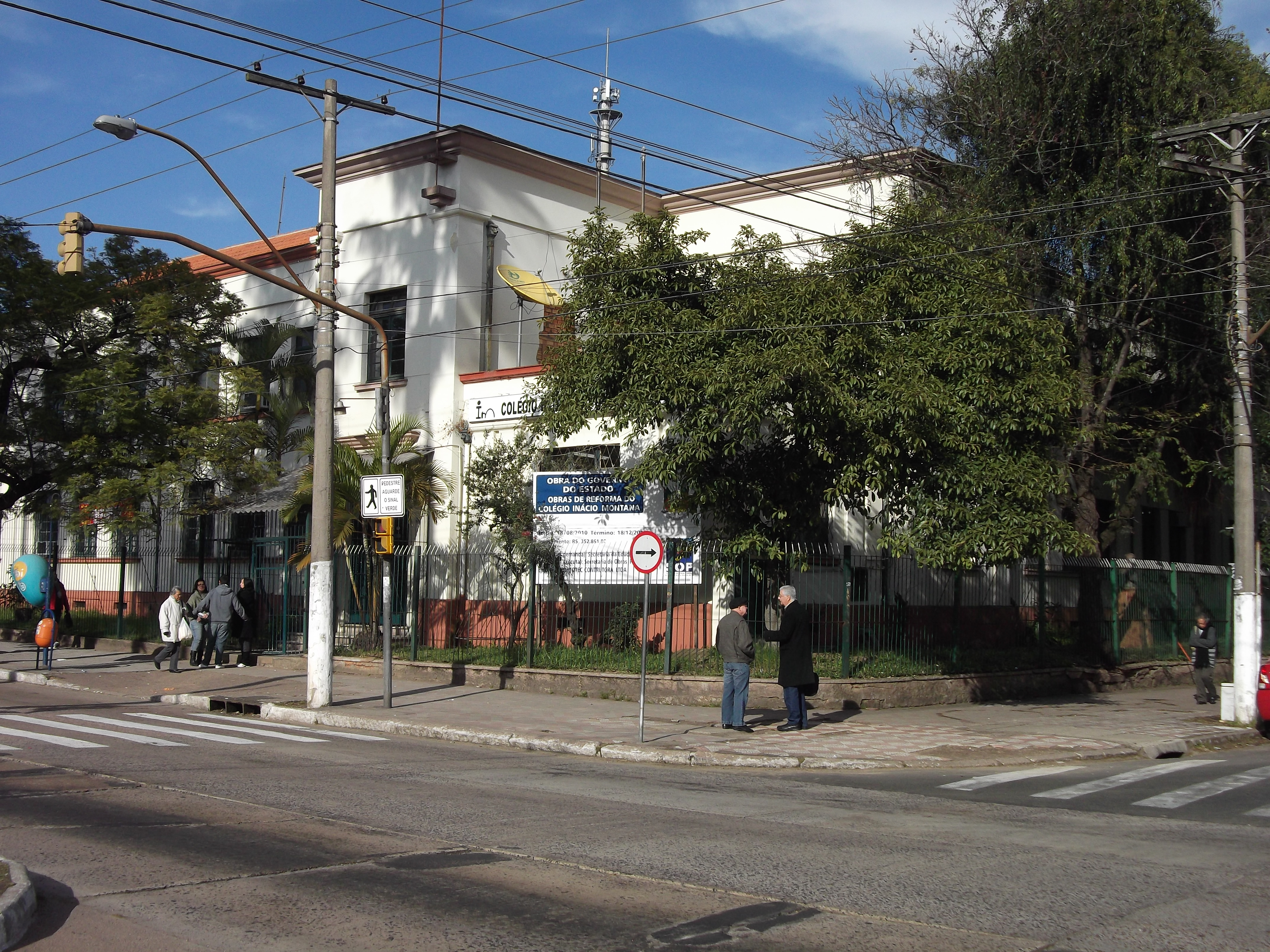
The new building of the State College Inácio Mountain

Inácio Montanha (25 July 1858 in Jaguarão — 1933 in Porto Alegre) was a Brazilian educator.

He pursued his studies at the Episcopal Seminary of Porto Alegre and graduated as a professor in 1879. Inácio Montanha gained recognition as one of the city's leading educators, teaching subjects such as Portuguese, Mathematics, History, and Geography. Given his reputation, he was invited to teach at the Seminar, and in 1890, he established and became the director of the Brazilian School. This institution, known for its prestige, became a model school and attracted students from the elite. Notable figures such as Nicolau de Araújo Switch, Walter Jobim, Getúlio Vargas, and Ildo Meneghetti passed through its classrooms. Additionally, one-third of the spots in the school were reserved for underprivileged students who otherwise would not have had access to education. After stepping down as director, Montanha dedicated himself to charitable work and served as an advisor to former students. His influential role as an educator extended beyond the borders of the state, particularly during a period of educational reforms, leaving a significant mark on the cultural landscape of the region during the late 19th and early 20th centuries.

The Brazilian School was later expropriated by the state government and continues its operations. In 1938, it was renamed in honor of Inácio Montanha, and since 1943, it has been housed in more spacious facilities.
