= List of Finnish utopian communities =

List of Finnish utopian communities

- Erikssons' exile sect (1732–1832), pietistic (120 members)
- New Jerusalem, Sierra Leone (1792-1792) religious, enlightenment
- Amurinmaan yhtiö, Strelok, Russia (1868-1872), socialist (50 members)
- Chillagoa, Queensland, Australia (1900-1900), socialist (80 members)
- Drummond, MI, USA, (1903–1930), Nationalistic, later socialist (250 members)
- Sointula, Malkosaari, British Columbia, Canada (1901-1905), socialist (1000 members)
- Sammon Takojat, British Columbia, Canada (1905-1912), socialist, theosophic (50 members)
- Red Deer plan, Alberta, Canada (1899-1899), nationalistic
- Itabo, Cuba (1904-1908), nationalist, socialist (50 members)
- Ponnistus, Cuba (1906-1909), socialist (50 members)
- Redwood Valley, California, United States (1912-1932), socialist, co-operative (120 members)
- Georgian Osuusfarmi, Georgia, United States (1921-1966), socialist co-operative (150 members)
- Kylväjä, Soviet Union, (1920–1940), Socialist
- Paradiso plan, Riviera, France (1925-1927), vegetarian
- Penedo, Rio de Janeiro, Brazil (1929-1940), vegetarian, religious (150 members)
- Viljavakka, Dominican Republic (1930-1944), vegetarian (140 inhabitants)
- Colonia Finlandesa, Misiones, Argentina (1906-1940), nationalistic (500 members)
- Colonia Villa Alborada, Paraguay (1920-1940), vegetarian (60 members)
- Jad Hashmona, Israel (1971->), religious (100 members)
- Emmaus Jokioinen, Finland (1977->), eco community (20 inhabitants)

== See also ==
- List of American Utopian communities
- Karelian fever
