= Irineu Evangelista de Sousa, Viscount of Mauá =

Brazilian politician

Viscount of Mauá
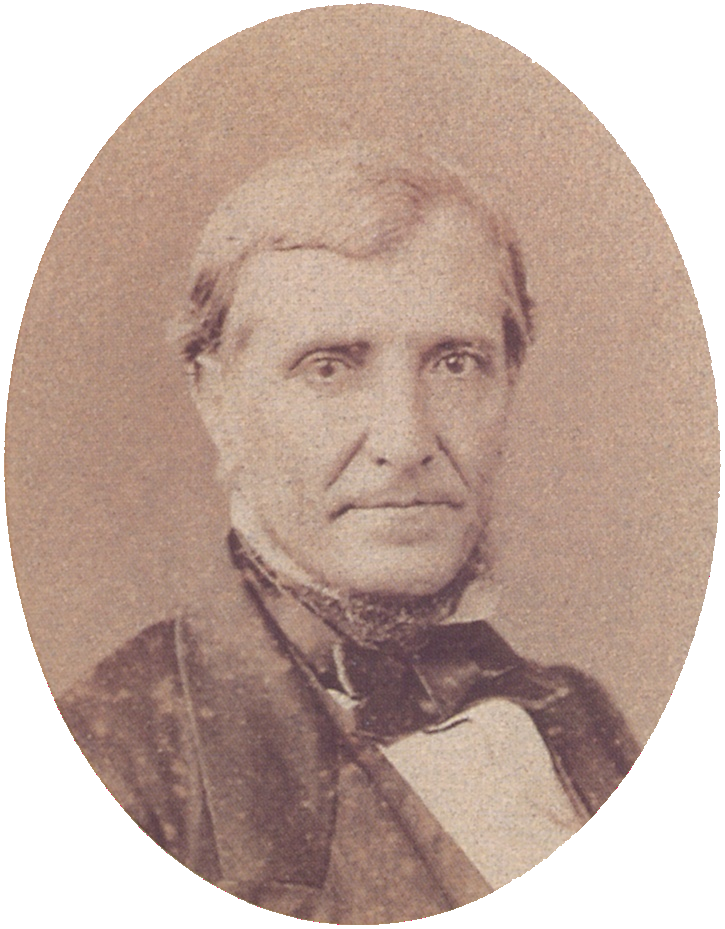
- Portrait by Insley Pacheco, c. 1870

Member of the Chamber of Deputies
- In office 24 December 1872 – 22 April 1873
- Constituency: Rio Grande do Sul
- In office 27 August 1855 – 2 August 1866
- Constituency: Rio Grande do Sul

Personal details
- Born: 28 December 1813 Arroio Grande, Rio Grande do Sul, Brazil
- Died: 21 October 1889 (aged 76) Petrópolis, Rio de Janeiro, Empire of Brazil
- Spouse: Maria Joaquina de Sousa Machado (m. 1841)
- Children: 18
- Parents: João Evangelista de Ávila e Sousa (father); Mariana de Jesus Batista de Carvalho (mother)
- Occupation: Business magnate; investor; politician
- Networth: $83 billion USD (2023 dollars)
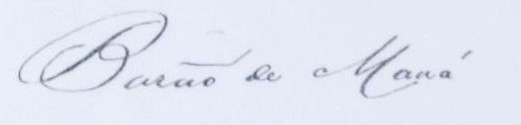
- Signature

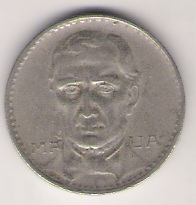
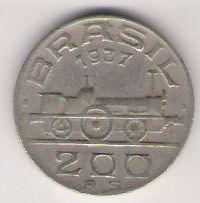
Sousa's likeness on a 200 réis coin from 1937.

Irineu Evangelista de Sousa, Viscount of Mauá (Portuguese pronunciation: [iɾiˈnew ivɐ̃ʒeˈliʃtɐ dʒi ˈsowzɐ]; 28 December 1813 – 21 October 1889), was a Brazilian entrepreneur, industrialist, banker and politician. Born to a family of small estancieiros (ranchers), Sousa became one of the world's richest men; by 1867, his wealth was larger than the annual budget of the Brazilian Empire. He was called the Rothschild of the South American continent by The New York Times in 1871. He received the titles of baron in 1854 and visconde com grandeza (viscount with grandee) of Mauá, in 1874. A pioneer in several areas of the economy of Brazil, one of his greatest achievements was to start the construction of the Mauá Railroad, the first railroad in Brazil, in 1852.

At his peak, Sousa controlled eight of the country's ten largest companies (the remaining two were state-owned); his banking interests stretched over to Britain, France, the United States and Argentina. Mauá also founded the first bank in Uruguay (Banco Mauá y Cia).

Sousa, who established the modern Banco do Brasil, is credited with financing much of the Brazilian economic activity in the 19th century, particularly in coffee plantation, and with the construction of the first railroads, shipyard and cast iron metalwork in the country. Sousa commissioned the first telegraphic submarine cable connecting South America to Europe, developed commercial transportation via steamboats on the Amazon and Guaíba rivers, and installed the first gas-fueled street lights in the city of Rio de Janeiro, then Brazil's capital. His fortunes turned around with the decay of the Empire after the Paraguayan War; by the time he died, Sousa had lost most of his wealth.

== Biography ==
=== Early life ===
The second son of João Evangelista de Ávila e Sousa and Mariana de Jesus Batista, Irineu Evangelista de Sousa was born on 28 December 1813 on his father's ranch in the then village of Nossa Senhora da Conceição do Arroio Grande, currently the municipality of Arroio Grande, near Brazil's southernmost border with the Spanish dominions in South America, which at the time was part of Jaguarão in the captaincy of São Pedro do Rio Grande do Sul. Sousa had ancestry from the Azores. Records show his paternal grandfather, Manuel Jerônimo de Sousa, was the owner of the Arroio Grande sesmaria, that is, a large plot of land given by the Portuguese crown, in 1798.

In 1818, when Sousa was five years old, his father was murdered while camping at night when travelling with a herd of cattle, (Note: Perhaps killed by cattle thieves on his journey south to sell the herd or accidentally hit by a bullet intended at one of his friends.) this deeply affected the family's income. His mother then married again in 1821, but the new husband did not want her children from the previous marriage; Mariana then offered Irineu's sister, Guilhermina, who was only 12 years old, in marriage to a man named José Machado de Lima. Irineu, who was 9 at the time, was taken to Rio de Janeiro by his uncle at the request of his mother. His uncle, José Batista de Carvalho, was the captain and owner of a sailing ship and regularly travelled to India, Portugal and the Brazilian coast, stopping at several of its ports.

Writer Anyda Marchant remarks Irineu might have had two years of schooling in São Paulo, from 1821 to 1823, pointing out, however, that this is unlikely. Another one of Irineu's biographers, Cláudio Ganns, dismisses this entirely, arguing that there is not any plausible indication to it. Irineu had been taught how to read and count from a young age by his mother. Once in Rio de Janeiro, the young boy was left alone, as his uncle once again sailed to India; Irineu was employed in a warehouse, where he worked as a clerk.

== Legacy and honors ==
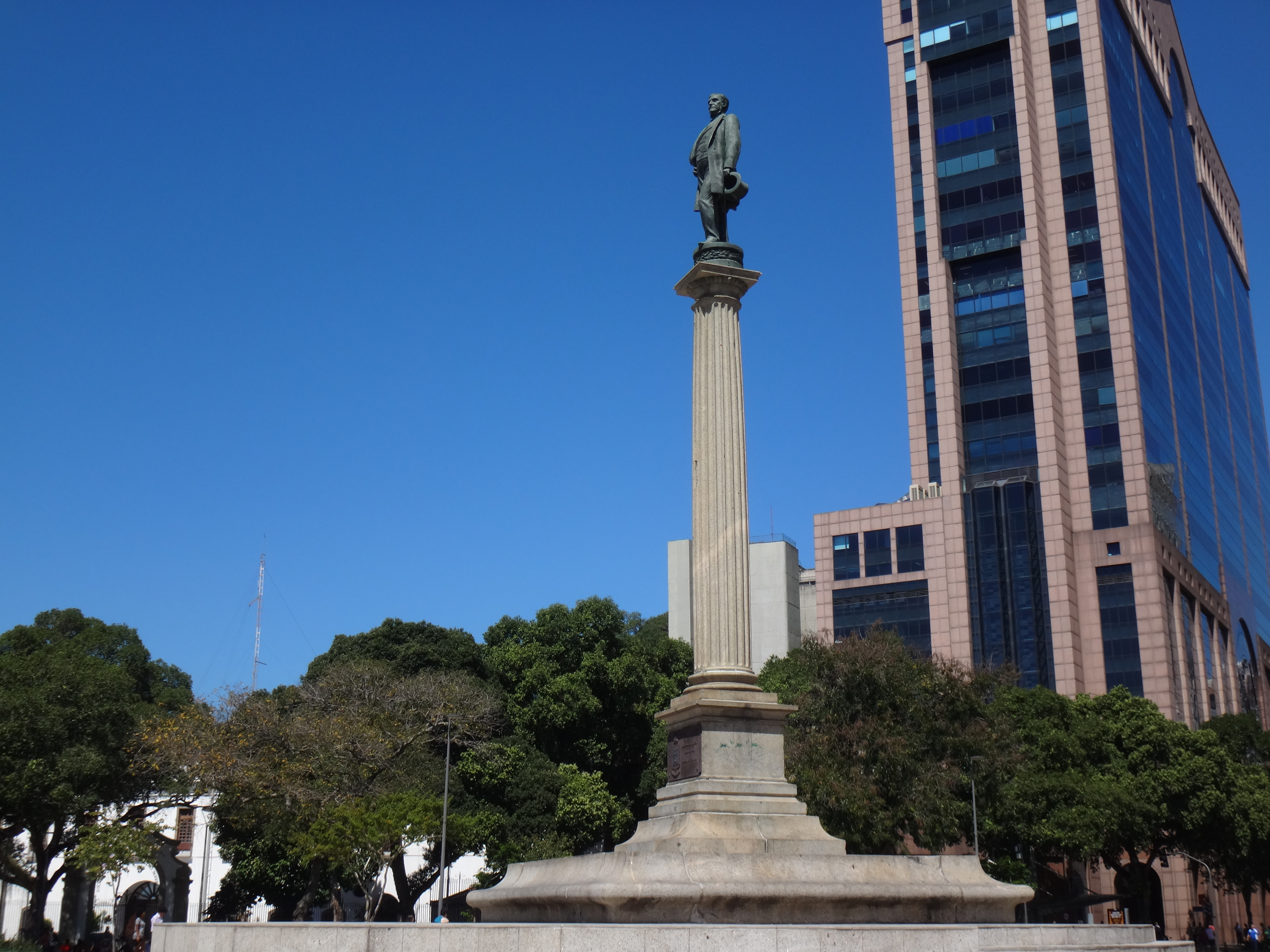
Statue of the Viscount of Mauá in Mauá Square, Rio de Janeiro.

At a time in which Brazil economy was dominated by landowners who prioritized exports in a slave-based economy, Sousa defended free market, liberalism, industrialization and the abolition of slavery. After his death, he was given several honors and acknowledgements:

- He is the patron of the Ministry of Transport
- The district of Visconde de Mauá is named after him
- The Baron of Mauá International Bridge links the city of Jaguarão, Rio Grande do Sul with Río Branco, Uruguay
- The day celebrated to the merchant navy in Brazil is on Sousa's birthday, December 28, due to his efforts ahead of the Ponta d'Areia shipyard.
- Praça Mauá, in Rio de Janeiro, is named after him. A statue in his likeness is in the center of the plaza.
- Barão de Mauá Station, former intercity railway station in Rio de Janeiro
