= Río Branco, Uruguay =

Rio Branco
- City
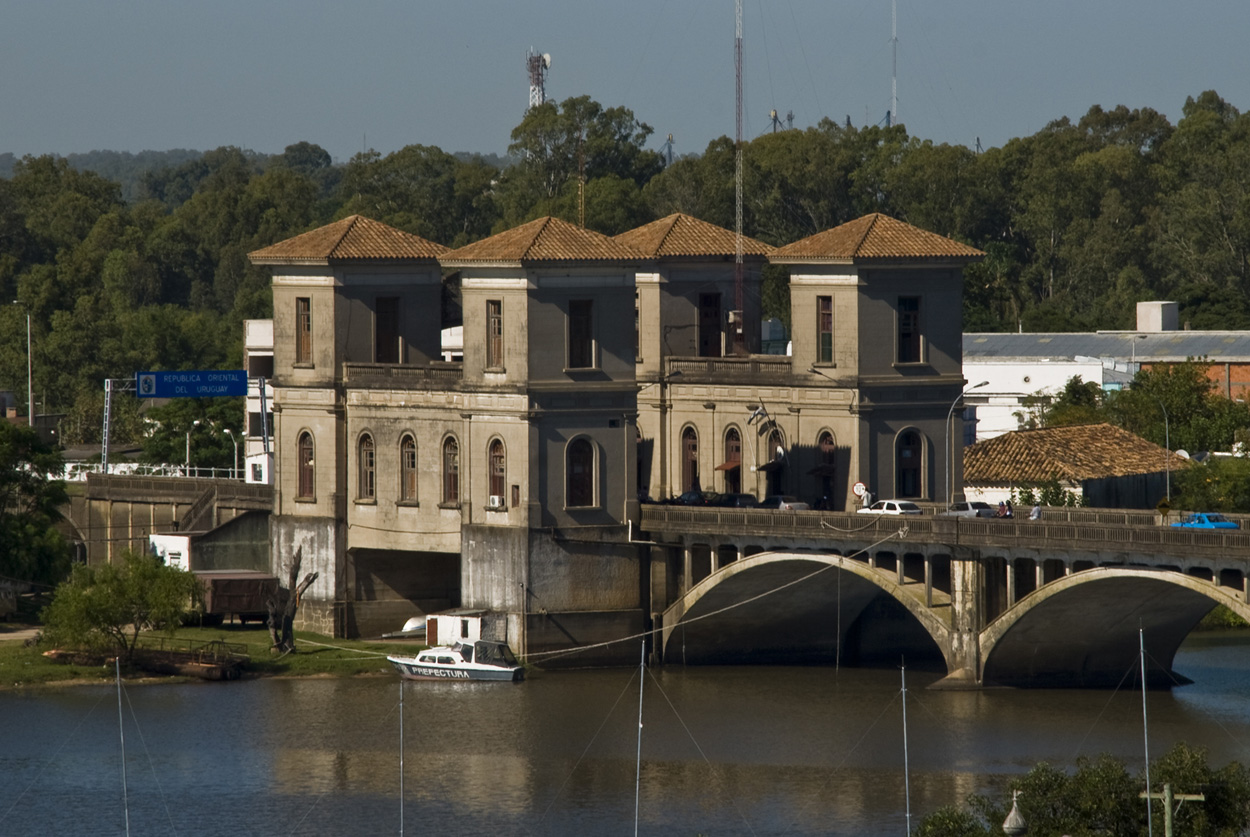
- Baron of Mauá International Bridge over Yaguarón River

- Location in Uruguay
- Coordinates: 32°35′50″S 53°23′0″W
- Country: Uruguay
- Department: Cerro Largo

Government
  - Mayor: Christian Morel (PN)

Population (2011 Census)
  - Total: 14,604
- Time zone: UTC -3
- Postal code: 37100
- Dial plan: +598 4675 (+4 digits)

Río Branco is a city in the Cerro Largo department of northeastern Uruguay, it borders the Brazilian city of Jaguarão, with which it communicates through the Baron of Mauá International Bridge. It is the easternmost city in all of Uruguay next to Barra del Chuy.

== Name ==
The words Rio Branco mean "white river" in Portuguese. However, the name does not refer to any local river; it is a tribute to Brazilian diplomat José Paranhos, Baron of Rio Branco, who negotiated the definitive borders of Brazil and Uruguay. Hence the Portuguese name, instead of Spanish Río Blanco (although the city's name has an acute accent on the first word that is required in Spanish, but absent from the Portuguese spelling).

== Geography ==
It is located at the east end of Route 26, about 86 kilometres (53 mi) east-southeast of the department capital city of Melo.

The Yaguarón River (Portuguese: Rio Jaguarão), which forms the natural border with Brazil, flows along the city's northern limits. Right across the river lies the Brazilian town of Jaguarão, with the Baron of Mauá International Bridge joining the two cities.

== History ==
On 31 August 1915, the villa (town) previously known as Artigas was given its present name by Act of Law 5330. On 1 July 1953, its status was elevated to a ciudad (city) by Act of Law 11,963.

== Population ==
In 2011, Río Branco had a population of 14,604.

Year	Population
1908	4,106
1963	4,023
1975	5,685
1985	9,072
1996	12,215
2004	13,456
2011	14,604

Source: Instituto Nacional de Estadística de Uruguay

== Consular representation ==
Brazil has a Vice-consulate in Río Branco.

== Places of worship ==
- St. John the Baptist Parish Church (Roman Catholic)
