= Visconde de Mauá, Resende =

District of Resende, Rio de Janeiro, Brazil

Coordinates: 22°19′54″S 44°32′22″W

Visconde de Mauá is a district of the city of Resende, in the state of Rio de Janeiro, Brazil.

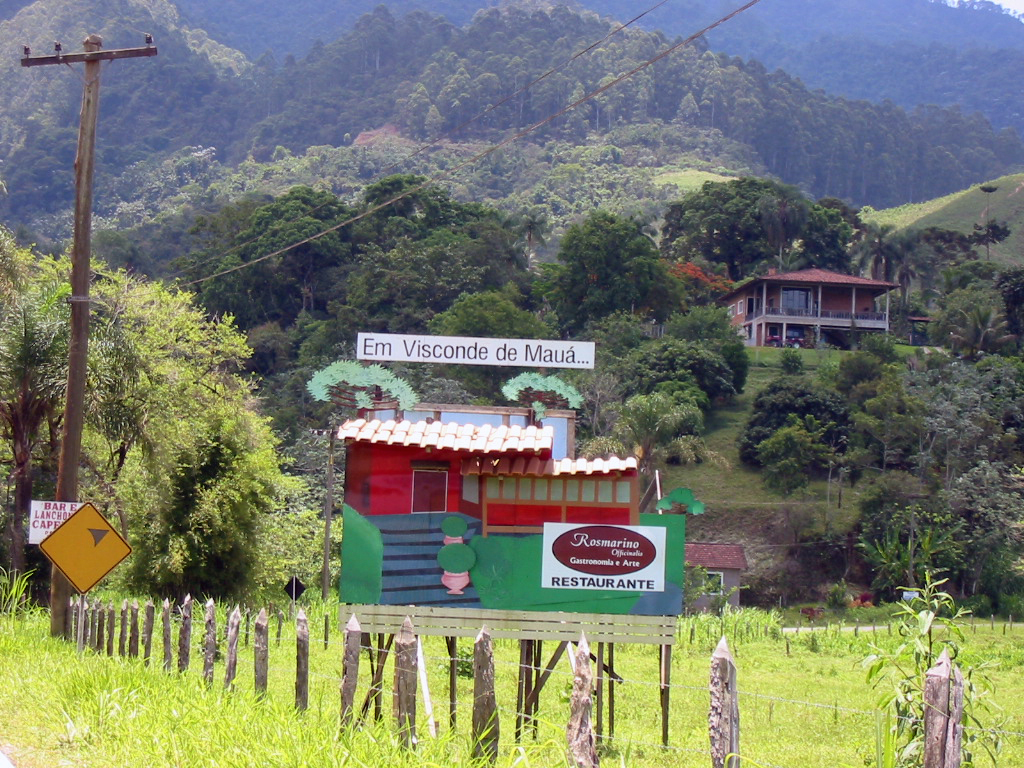
A roadside view in Visconde de Mauá

The name Visconde de Mauá is attributed to the set of villages of Mauá, Maringá and Maromba and its diverse valleys, as the Vale das Cruzes, Alcantilado, Pavão and Grama. The region includes parts of the cities of Resende, Itatiaia and Bocaina de Minas, in the state of Minas Gerais. The villages are, on average, within 40 kilometers of the centers of these cities.

Visconde de Mauá has about 6,000 inhabitants. The main economic activity of the region is tourism, with more than 100 establishments of lodging and dozen of restaurants, some specializing in trout and pine nut recipes.

This region is located in an area of environmental preservation, in the Serra da Mantiqueira mountain range, at 1200 meters of altitude.

== History ==
The name Visconde de Mauá bears homage to Irineu Evangelista de Sousa, baron and later viscount, who received lands in the region in 1870, as a concession of the imperial government for wood exploration, that would be transformed into vegetal coal. In 1889, still in the Empire, his son, Enrique Irineu de Souza, installed in lands a colonial nucleus, formed for families of European immigrants. The initiative failed and most of the colonists returned to the native countries. In 1908 the federal government purchased the lands of Enrique and creates the Colonial Nucleus Visconde de Mauá, second attempt to receive European colonists. This nucleus finished in 1916.

Some German families had remained in Visconde de Mauá and, from the decade of 1930, they started to receive relatives and friends from Europe, initiating the tourist activity in the region. In the decade of 1970, the village of Maromba was discovered by hippies and, from the 1980s, became one of the preferred mountain destinations of tourists of Rio de Janeiro and São Paulo.

Curiosity: Irineu Evangelista, viscount of Mauá, was never in the region that today takes its name.

== Weather ==
The climate of the region is classified as tropical of altitude, having light summers and cold and dry winters. In the winter, from June to August, temperature can go from −2 to 13 °C (28 to 55 °F). The summer presents rain frequently, mainly evening rains, with temperatures varying from 8 to 27 °C (46 to 81 °F).

== Access ==
The nearest International airports to Visconde de Mauá are Tom Jobim/Galeão (GIG) in Rio de Janeiro and Cumbica/Guarulhos (GRU) in São Paulo.

From Rio

- By car: Take the Dutra highway (BR-116), see: Rodovia Presidente Dutra, towards São Paulo. 6 kilometers after Resende city, turn right to Visconde de Mauá and Penedo at access 311. Go straight on the RJ-163 for about 34 kilometers until you reach Visconde de Mauá. The last 15 km is not paved.
- By bus: Contact Cidade do Aço company at the municipal bus station (Phone +55 21 2233-1218). Approx 3 hours travel.

From São Paulo

- By car: Take the Dutra highway (BR 116), see: Rodovia Presidente Dutra, towards Rio de Janeiro. 5 km after Itatiaia city (before Resende), turn left to Visconde de Mauá and Penedo at access 311. Go straight on the RJ-163 for about 34 kilometers until you reach Visconde de Mauá. The last 15 km is not paved.
- By bus: Contact Cometa bus company at the Tietê Station (phone +55 11 4004 9600). There are lines to Resende (approx. 4 hours). You must take a local bus to go from Resende to Visconde de Mauá (approx. 1 hour).

== Distances ==
- Rio de Janeiro: 200 km (120 mi)
- São Paulo: 300 km (190 mi)

== Further information ==
- Visconde de Mauá does not have banks, and some inns and restaurants do not accept credit cards. The nearest banks are about 40 km away, in the city of Resende.
- Zip code: 27560-000 - Visconde de Mauá
- Phone code: 55 (country) and 24 (regional)
- Mobile phones: Vivo and Claro. Visconde de Mauá does not have GSM signal.
