= Itatiaia =

- Municipality
- Município de Itatiaia; Municipality of Itatiaia
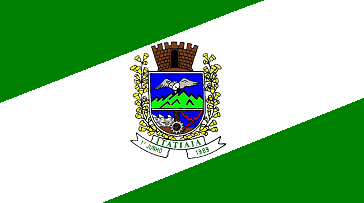
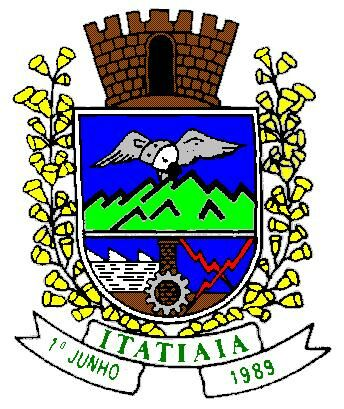
- Flag Coat of arms

- Location of Itatiaia in the state of Rio de Janeiro

- Location of Itatiaia in Brazil
- Coordinates: 22°29′46″S 44°33′48″W
- Country: Brazil
- Region: Southeast
- State: Rio de Janeiro
- Founded: 1 June 1989

Government
  - Type: Mayor-council
  - Mayor: Dudu (PMDB)

Area
  - Total: 224.957 km^{2} (86.856 sq mi)
- Elevation: 695 m (2,280 ft)

Population (2020)
  - Total: 32,064
  - Density: 133.34/km^{2} (345.3/sq mi)
- Demonym: Itatiaiense
- Time zone: UTC−3 (BRT)
  - Summer (DST): UTC−2 (BRST)
- Area code: +55 24
- Climate: Cwa
- Website: http://itatiaia.rj.gov.br/

Itatiaia (Portuguese pronunciation: [itɐtʃiˈajjɐ]) is a municipality located in the Brazilian state of Rio de Janeiro. With a 2021 population estimate of 32,312, it is the 1,097th-most populous municipality in Brazil. Located in the Mantiqueira mountain range and on the border of the states of Rio de Janeiro and Minais Gerais, it covers an area of 241.035 km^{2} (93.064 sq mi).

The oldest national park in Brazil, Itatiaia National Park (Parque Nacional do Itatiaia), is partially located within Itatiaia. The municipality also contains part of the 8,036 ha (19,860-acre) Pedra Selada State Park, created in 2012.

== Etymology ==
Itatiaia is a Guaraní term meaning "pointed stone," formed from the words itá ("stone") and atîaîa ("pointed").

== History ==
Itatiaia's current territory was originally inhabited by the Tupi, Purí, and Coroado indigenous tribes. The first Europeans arrived in the region in the 17th century, most being bandeirantes in search of gold. The demand for gold trade routes from Minas Gerais to the ports of Angra dos Reis and Parati encouraged expeditions over the Mantiqueira mountain range through what are now the municipalities of Mauá and Itatiaia.

With the shuttering of the region's gold mines, the district's landowners transitioned to sugarcane and coffee farming. One of the municipality's largest such farms was owned by politician Irineu Evangelista de Sousa. The farm's lands are now part of Itatiaia National Park, its forests having been preserved due to Sousa's avoidance of coffee monoculture farming methods.

In 1832, a justice of the peace and notary public were installed in the district. On April 5, 1839, what is now Itatiaia was officially split off from the municipality of Resende and given the name Campo Belo ("Beautiful Field"). That same year, the district's first ecclesiastical curate was installed.

On December 31, 1943, the district's name was changed from Campo Belo to Itatiaia.

The district of Itatiaia was elevated to the status of municipality on July 6, 1988.

== Tourism ==
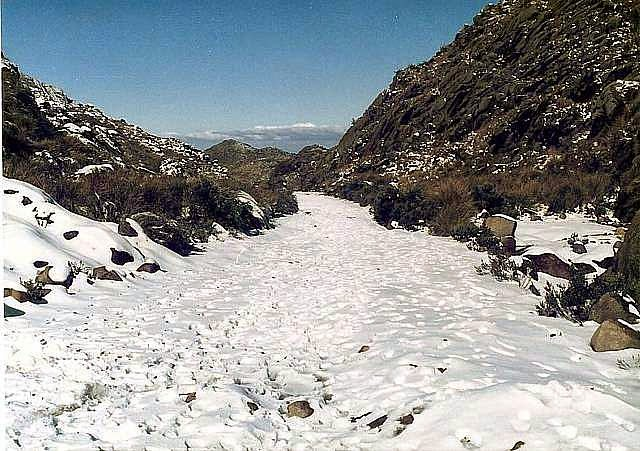
Snow in Itatiaia National Park, 1985. That year, temperatures in the park reached a record low of −13 °C (9 °F).

Itatiaia's mild climate and mountainous landscape attracts thousands of visitors each year, with many rock climbing and hiking in the surrounding mountains.

In addition to the Itatiaia National Park, Itatiaia's other tourist destinations include the former Finnish colony of Penedo and the villages of Maromba and Maringá, both located in the region of Visconde de Mauá.

=== Itatiaia National Park ===
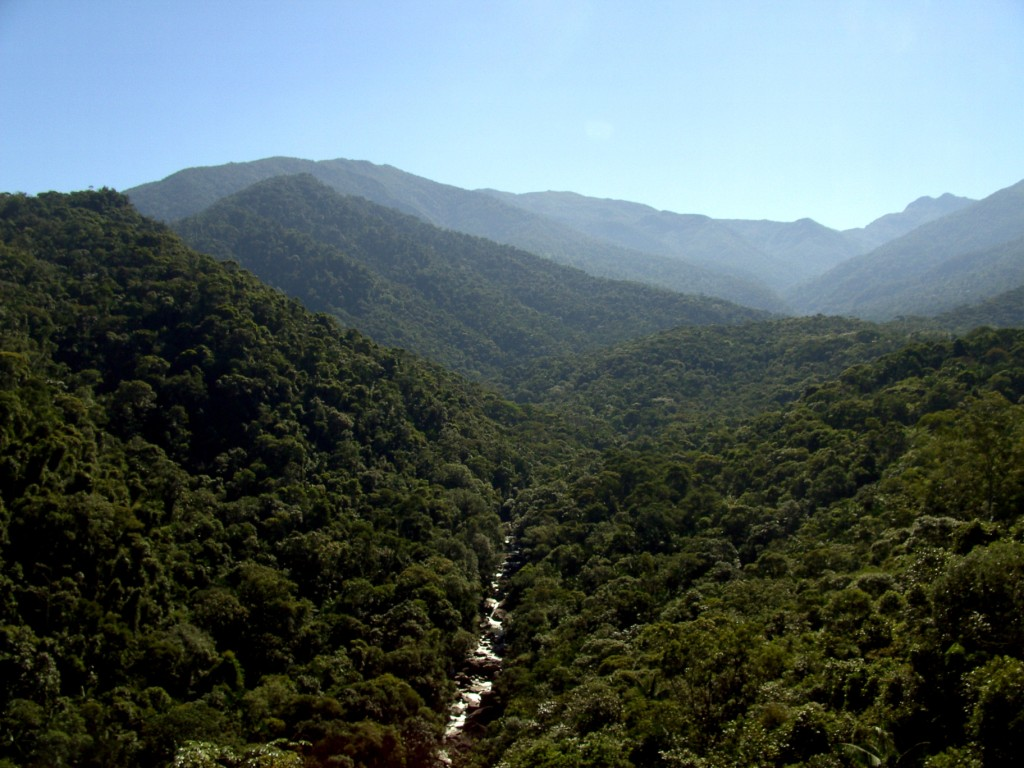
View from Mirante do ultimo adeus., Itatiaia National Park

Itatiaia National Park, located partially in the municipality, is a tourist attraction and Brazil's first national park. It was created in 1937 under then-president Getúlio Vargas.

=== Pico das Agulhas Negras ===
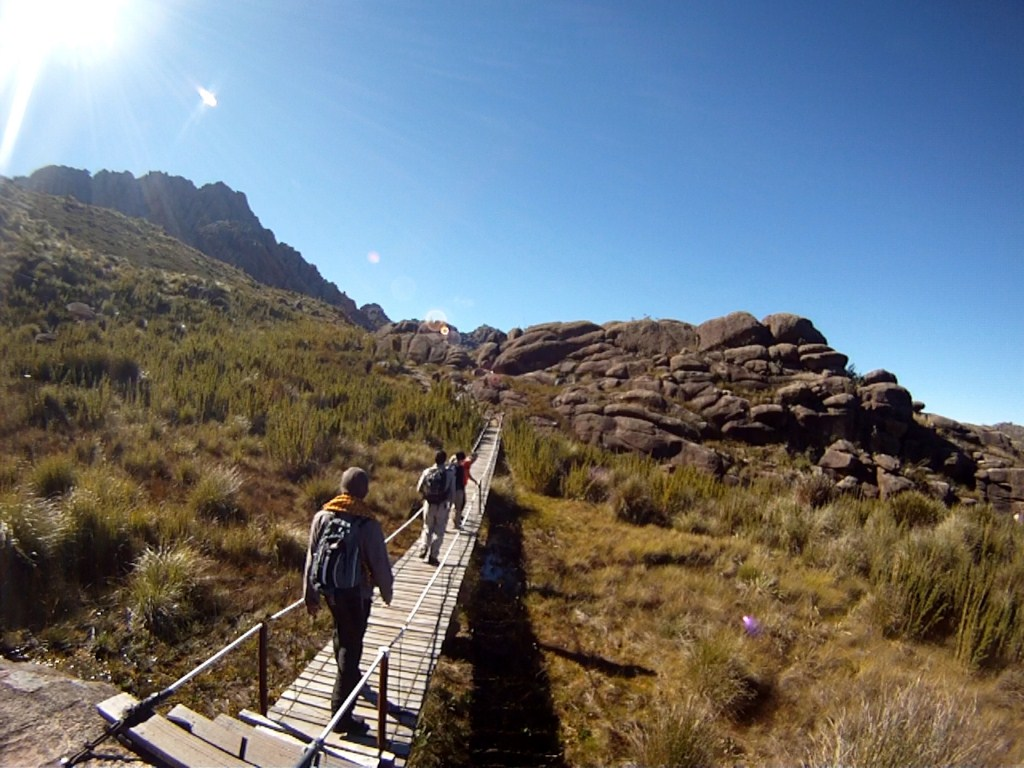
Pico das Agulhas Negras

The Agulhas Negras peak, with a height of 2,790.94 m (9,156.6 ft), is the highest point in the state of Rio de Janeiro and the fifth highest in Brazil.

Although it is located in a tropical zone, the peak usually registers negative temperatures during the winter and occasionally snow in years exceptionally more humid.

=== Penedo ===
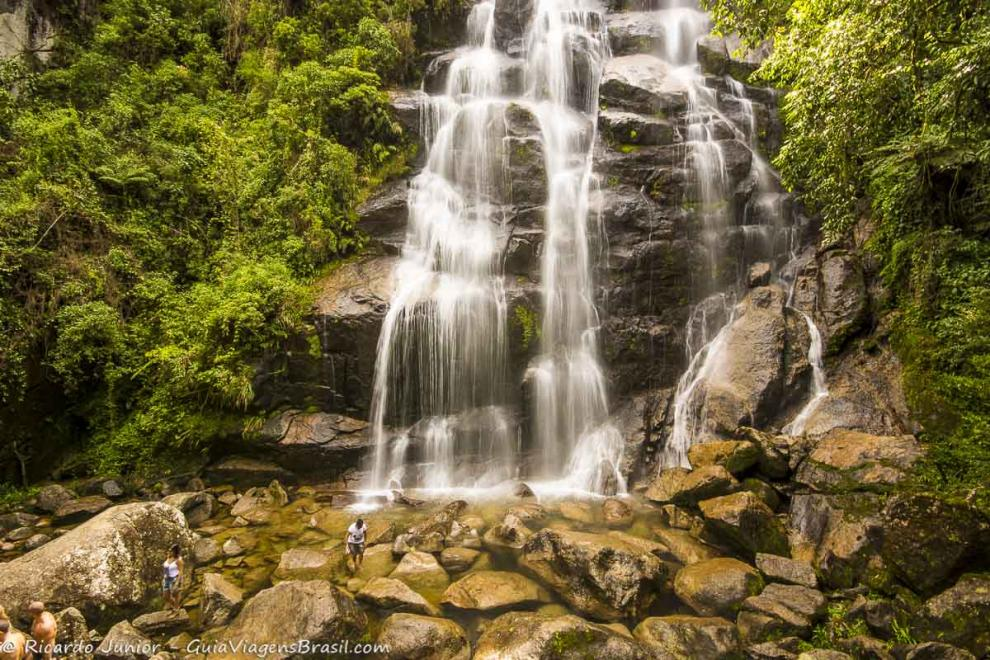
Waterfall véu de noiva, Itatiaia National Park

Penedo is a neighborhood and ecological park of the municipality of Itatiaia. It is the main Finnish colony of Brazil, which still shows remarkable in the architecture of residences and commercial buildings, as well as in the local culture.

Finnish immigration in Brazil was the migration movement in the twentieth century of Finns to the interior of the state of Rio de Janeiro, Brazil, where they created a settlement called Penedo at the foot of the Itatiaia National Park in the city of Itatiaia.

Penedo has a network of 52 hotels and 39 restaurants.

== Infrastructure ==
=== Education ===
The municipality of Itatiaia contains a system of public and private education, with twenty municipal schools, one state school, and five private schools.

=== Public security ===
==== Military police ====
The ostensible policing of the city is carried out by the 2nd Company of the 37th Military Police Battalion of the State of Rio de Janeiro (37º BPM / 2ªCia), with headquarters in the city center, counting Itatiaia, with a Community Policing Station in the region of Penedo.

==== Civil police ====
The Civil Police of the State of Rio de Janeiro maintains in the municipality the 99th Police Station (99th DP), subordinated to the 9th Regional Police Coordination of the Interior (9th CRPI).

==== Municipal Guard and Civil Defense ====
The city also has a Civil Defense team, to monitor and assist the population in the event of natural disasters, as well as maintains a Municipal Guard, responsible for monitoring the public patrimony and organizing the traffic in the city.

==== Fire Department ====
It was inaugurated by the Rio de Janeiro State Fire Brigade (CBMERJ), on July 27, 2016, at 1:00 p.m., an operational unit in the municipality of Itatiaia. The headquarters has a hybrid vehicle and a staff of 24 soldiers. The unit is located between the Municipal Hospital and Maternity Dr. Manoel Martins de Barros and the 99th Police Department, in the neighborhood of Jardim Itatiaia.

There are 2,615.48 m^{2} (28,152.8 sq ft) of land, which were ceded by the Itatiaia City Hall, with 407 m^{2} (4,380 sq ft) of total constructed area. The work, financed with resources of the fire rate, received an investment of R $647,000.

The unit is commanded by Lieutenant Colonel Mauro Junior and is subordinate to the 23rd GBM - Resende.

The barracks is 4.7 km (2.9 mi) from the entrance of the Itatiaia National Park, which will enable faster rescue from forest fires.
