= Jaguarão River =

Brazilian and Uruguayan river

Coordinates: 32°39′14″S 53°10′56″W

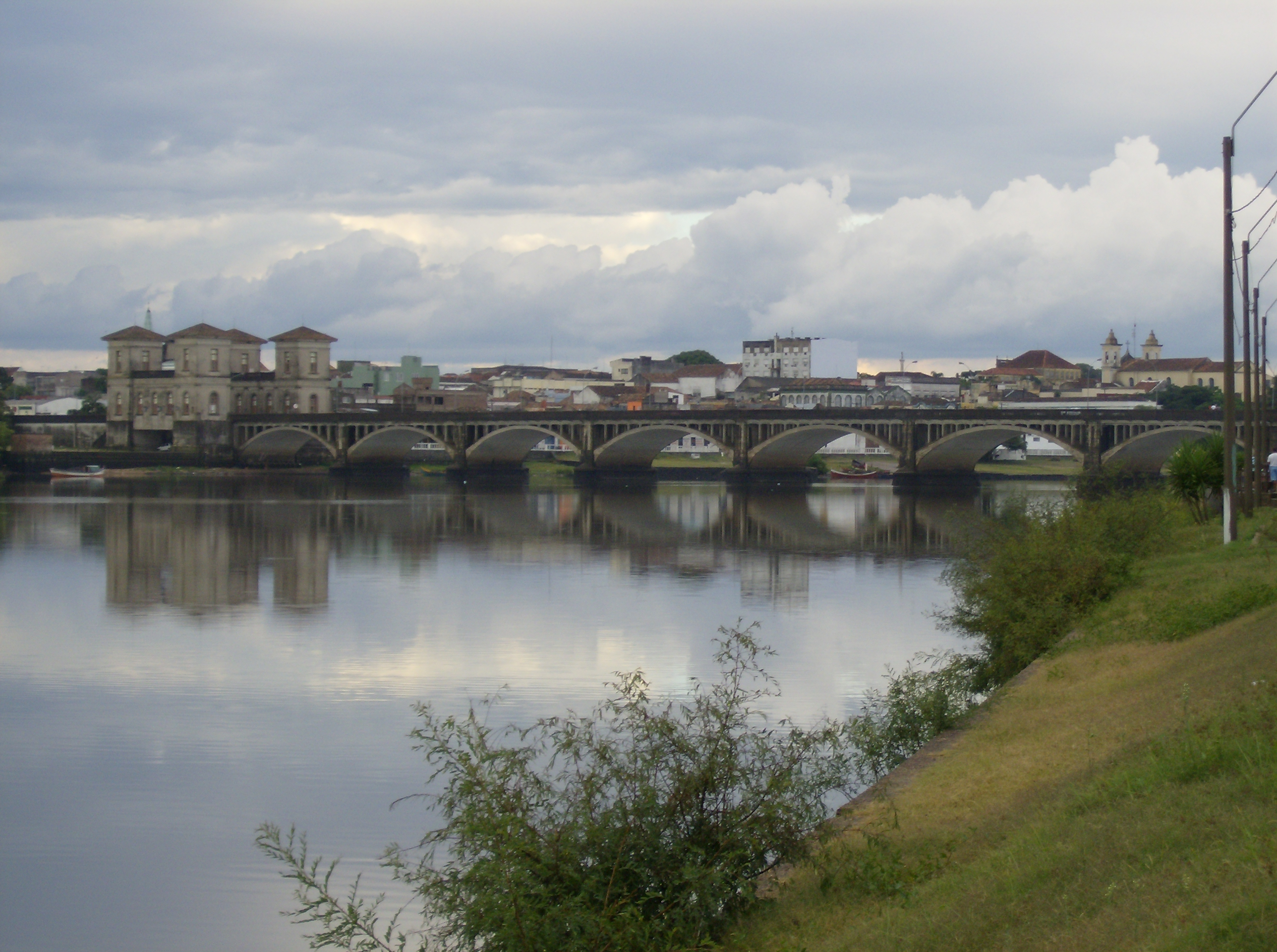
The Baron of Mauá International Bridge over the Jaguarão river, border between Uruguay and Brazil

The Jaguarão or Yaguarón River (Portuguese: Rio Jaguarão, Spanish: Río Yaguarón) is a Brazilian and Uruguayan river. It forms the border between Uruguay and Rio Grande do Sul state in southernmost Brazil.

The river originates in Serras de Sudeste (Southeastern Mountain Ranges) and flows east to empty into Lagoa Mirim (Portuguese) / Laguna Merín (Spanish), which is a large coastal lagoon, which is indirectly connected to the Atlantic Ocean.

== Navigability ==
The river is navigable as far up as the town of Jaguarão. Regarding its navigability, vessels sailing on the nearby Mirim Lagoon are by treaty under Brazilian jurisdiction.

== See also ==
- Geography of Uruguay#Topography and hydrography
- 1851 Boundary Treaty (Brazil–Uruguay)
- Battle of Jaguarão
