= Baron of Mauá International Bridge =

International Bridge between Uruguay and Brazil

Coordinates: 32.5710°S 53.3778°W

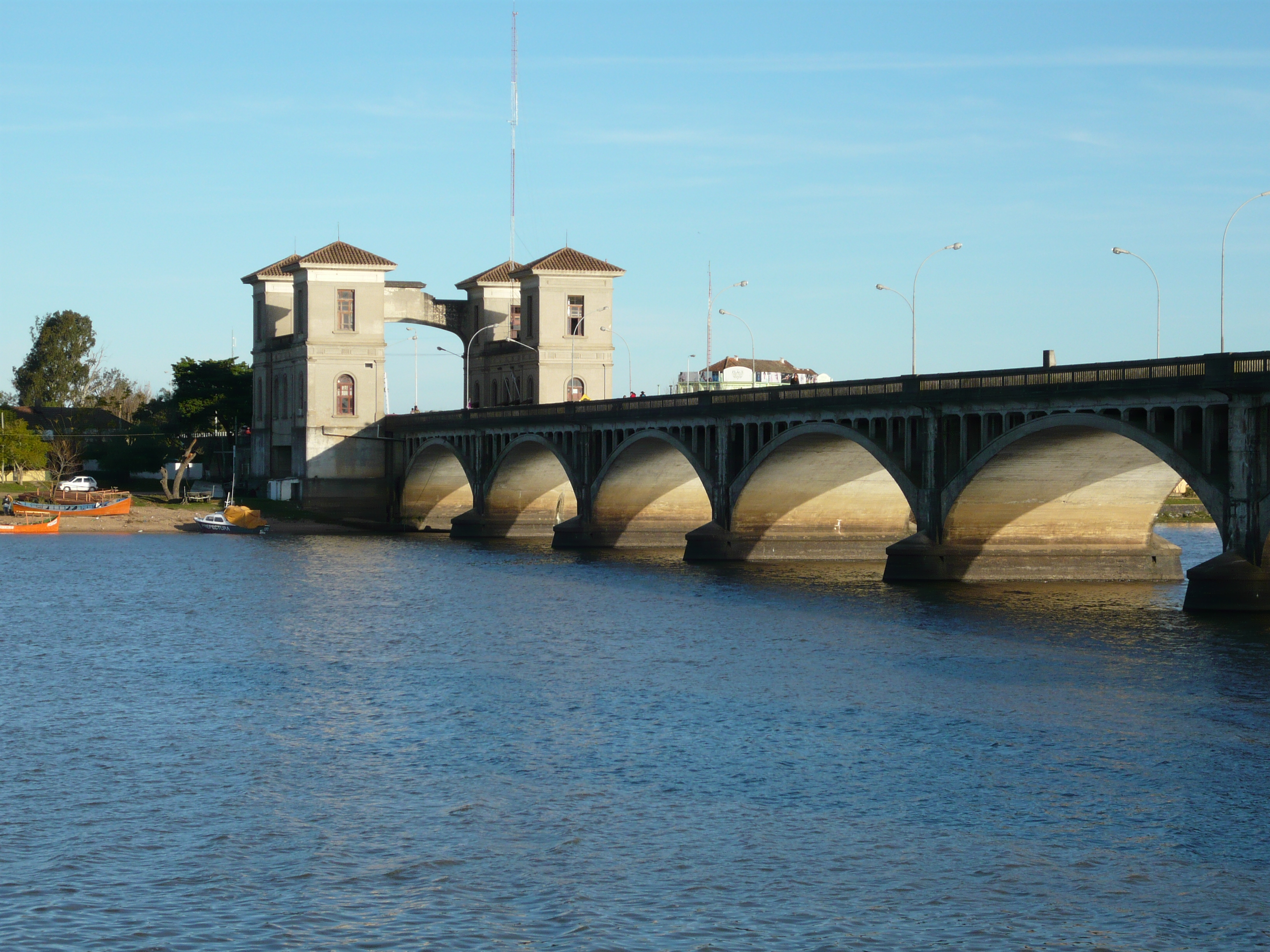
The Uruguayan side of the Baron of Mauá bridge

The Baron of Mauá International Bridge (Portuguese: Ponte Internacional Barão de Mauá, Spanish: Puente Internacional Barón de Mauá) is a bridge that crosses the Jaguarão River, linking the cities of Jaguarão, Rio Grande do Sul, Brazil and Río Branco, Uruguay.

Built between 1927 and 1930, it was named in honor of Irineu Evangelista de Souza, Baron and Viscount of Mauá, an important businessman and banker who developed activities in both countries during the 19th century.

== See also ==
- List of international bridges
