= Battle of Jaguarão =

Battle of the Uruguayan War

- Part of the Uruguayan War
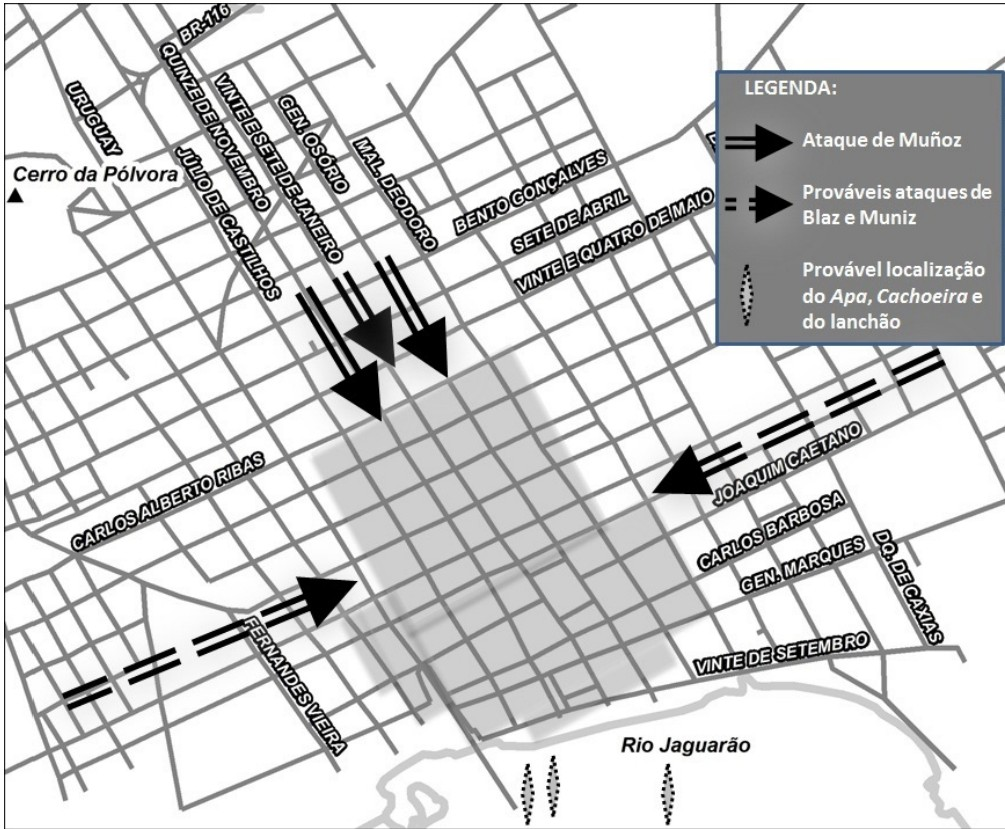
- Map of the Jaguarão combat zone
Date	27 January 1865
Location	Jaguarão in southern Rio Grande do Sul, Brazil
Result	Brazilian victory

Belligerents
Empire of Brazil: Imperial Army	Uruguay: Uruguayan Army

Commanders and leaders
Manoel Vargas	Basilio Muñoz; Timoteo Aparicio

Strength
90 infantrymen 400 cavalrymen	1,500 cavalrymen

Casualties and losses
6: 2 killed 4 wounded	26: 6 killed 20 wounded

The Battle of Jaguarão was fought in the town of Jaguarão in the then province of Rio Grande do Sul, on 27 January 1865, between the Imperial Brazilian Army and a Uruguayan militia during the Uruguayan War.
