= Penedo, Itatiaia =

Coordinates: 22°26′34″S 44°31′43″W

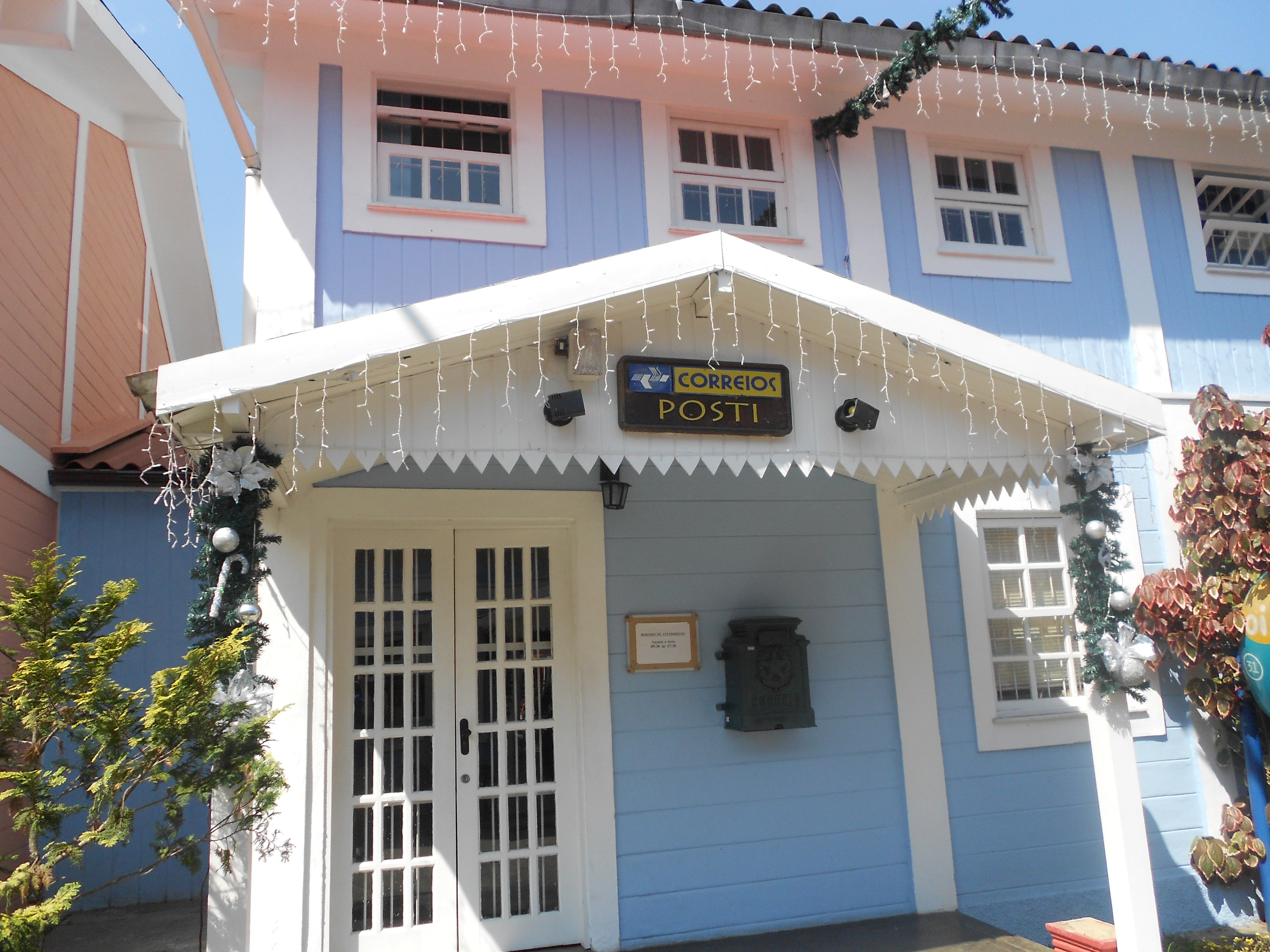
Finnish-themed Correios post office in Penedo

Penedo is a district in the Itatiaia municipality, located in the southern region of Rio de Janeiro state, in Brazil. Founded as a vegan commune by a group of Finnish settlers led by Toivo Uuskallio, it is now a Finland-themed tourist destination.

In the 1920s, Uuskallio was inspired by a dream to establish a colony in the tropics, and began gathering followers to move with him to Brazil. He wrote in his 1929 book Matkalla kohti tropiikin taikaa ('On the way to the magic of the tropics'): "I had been invited to leave my homeland and move far to the South. The invitation was strange in that it arrived at night and without a visible messenger. The message came into my soul and awakened my conscious self." Uuskallio, who believed humans were not intended by God to live in cold climates, envisioned the commune as moneyless and free of vehicles, with residents dressing lightly and easing into nudism. Potential colonists were recruited through newspaper advertisements and leaflets; they were required to answer 28 questions, regarding their backgrounds, views on vegetarianism and the use of alcohol and tobacco, and how much capital they could contribute to the founding of the colony. Some followers travelled to Canada to work as foresters in order to raise funds. Over one million Finnish marks were raised for the project, with the fund managed by a pastor, Harri D. Pennanen.

In the autumn of 1927, Uuskallio traveled on a cargo ship to Brazil with a small group of pioneers to scout potential sites. On January 28, 1929, Toivo and his wife Margaret Elizabeth Uuskallio (b. 1901, d. 1998, known as Liisa) purchased Fazenda Penedo—a roughly 3,500-hectare former coffee plantation and cattle ranch located about 200 kilometers from Rio de Janeiro—from the financially troubled São Penedo monastery. Between 1928 and 1929, 159 Finns moved to Penedo. Most were middle-class men from major cities in southern Finland who supported vegetarianism. However, not everyone who arrived shared Uuskallio’s ideologies; some joined out of a sense of adventure or to escape hardships in Finland. Most who arrived in the early years returned to Finland within a year, leaving a permanent group of only about 50 people. According to Uuskallio’s teachings, animal products were banned in the colony, as were coffee, tea, alcohol, and tobacco.

The settlers ate together in the large kitchen of the main building and, in the evenings, gathered in the social hall to sing and play. The choir sang a "welcome hymn" whenever Uuskallio returned from a trip. To bathe, the Penedo Finns built a sauna, the first in Brazil, washing on alternating days by sex. The Finnish envoy to Brazil, G. A. Gripenberg, visited the sauna in 1932. The commune's Brazilian neighbors were fascinated and scandalized by the sauna practice, and once a Brazilian man joined the Finns, naked, on a day reserved for female community members. Hot water was thrown at him and he fled, offended. The principle of general nudism in Penedo was abandoned, as the sun was too oppressive.

Initially, the colony practiced subsistence vegetable gardening and cultivated oranges for sale. The Brazilian State test garden had donated 3,000 avocado seedlings to the Finns for the project of regenerating the land for cultivation. The project was unsuccessful, with only one avocado tree surviving after five years. The cultivation of other crops, such as beans, dates, figs, and figs, was generally unsuccessful, with the exceptions of bananas, yams, and citrus. The ranch's cattle had been given away in the name of vegetarianism, and livestock farming was prohibited until 1932, leading many colonists to procure meat, milk, eggs, and banned substances like alcohol and tobacco from outside the colony, including by stealing from nearby Brazilian farms. The land was poorly suited for farming: rain, drought, plant diseases, locusts, and other pests destroyed crops, and settlers were forced to work just for scant food. Children suffered from deficiencies and young men contracted "lorvitautiin", and the community's health was negatively impacted by Uuskallio's opposition to Western medicine in favor of sunbathing and fasting as treatments. A number of Penedo Finns were of middle-class backgrounds, with no experience in farming. Consequently, the turnover rate of residents was high.

Although Uuskallio had purchased the estate using the settlers' funds, he held sole ownership of the land. He struggled with financial management, and by 1939, nearly the entire estate was mortgaged. In May 1942, the Uuskallios were finally forced by WWII and a declining citrus market to sell Penedo to the Swiss pharmaceutical company Geiky. Registered plots previously separated from the estate, as well as the "Kaleva" area, were excluded from the sale. Many Finns remained in Penedo and found employment with the pharmaceutical company.

Following the sale of Fazenda Penedo, tourism-based business began to flourish due to the area's proximity to Rio de Janeiro and São Paulo. Hotels, boarding houses, workshops, and shops selling Finnish-made goods were established. Toivo and Liisa Uuskallio’s boarding house was the first in Penedo. Many Finnish residents began cultivating luffa and manufacturing various products from it. Finns also worked as massage therapists in Penedo and Rio de Janeiro. In 1964, textile artist Eila Ampula opened her studio in Penedo, and Martti Aaltonen, along with his wife Aili, established a candle factory. In 1998, a themed area called Pikku-Suomi (Little Finland) and Joulumaa (Santa’s Village) was opened to showcase the Finnish lifestyle and artifacts, designed by Finnish-Penedo architects Alva and Sergio Fagerlande. In 2021, Penedo had 63,000 inhabitants, including a few Finns.

Toivo Uuskallio died in 1969 and is buried in the Penedo Finns' own cemetery, located in the nearby municipality of Resende.
