= Yad HaShmona =

Cooperative village in central Israel

Yad HaShmona: יד השמונה (Hebrew); ياد هاشمونا (Arabic)
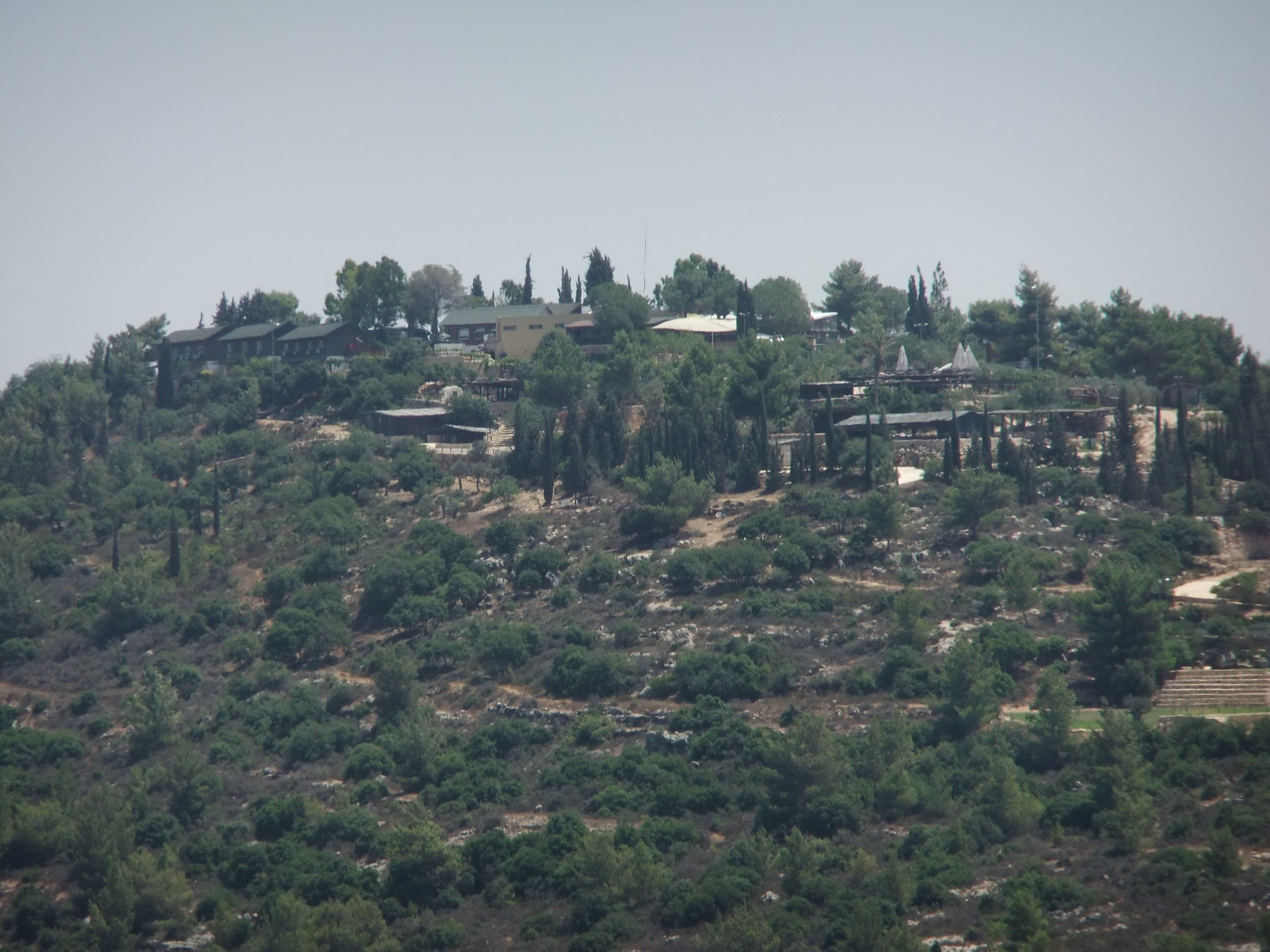
- Etymology: 'Memorial of the Eight'
- Location within Jerusalem District Location within Israel
- Coordinates: 31°48′37″N 35°5′20″E
- Country: Israel
- District: Jerusalem
- Council: Mateh Yehuda
- Affiliation: Agricultural Union
- Founded: 1971
- Founder: Finnish pioneers
- Population (2024): 264

Yad HaShmona (Hebrew: יַד הַשְּׁמוֹנָה, lit. Memorial of the Eight) is a small moshav shitufi in central Israel. Located in the Judean Mountains near Jerusalem, it falls under the jurisdiction of Mateh Yehuda Regional Council. In 2024 it had a population of 264.

== History ==
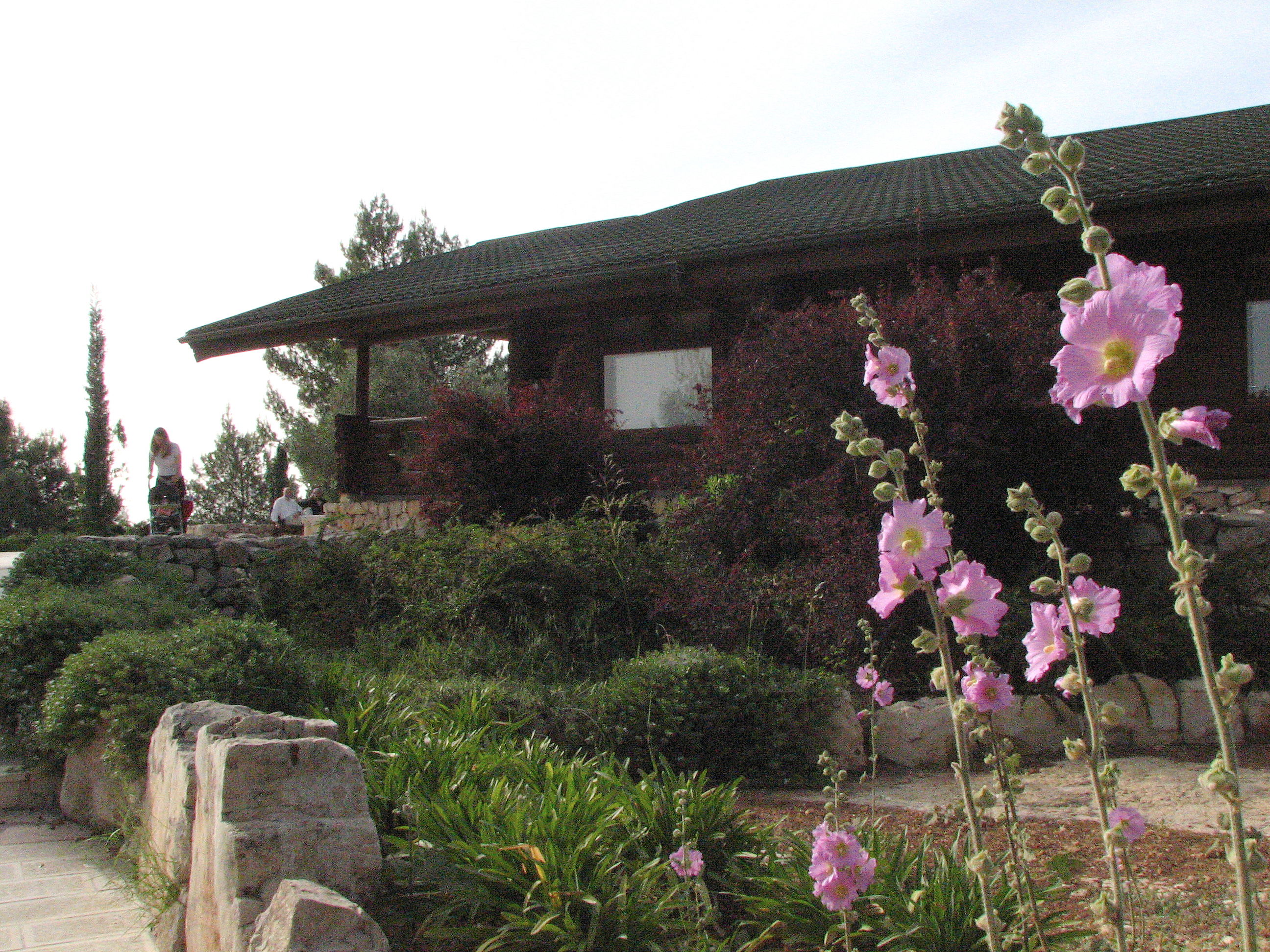
Wooden cabin, Yad HaShmona guesthouse

Yad HaShmona was founded in 1971 by a small group of Finnish Christians and was named for eight Jewish refugees from Austria who escaped to Finland in 1938. The Finnish government, collaborating with the Nazis, handed the refugees over to the Gestapo in 1942. Seven of them were murdered in Auschwitz; the only survivor, Georg Kollmann, who lost his family in extermination camps, later immigrated to Israel.

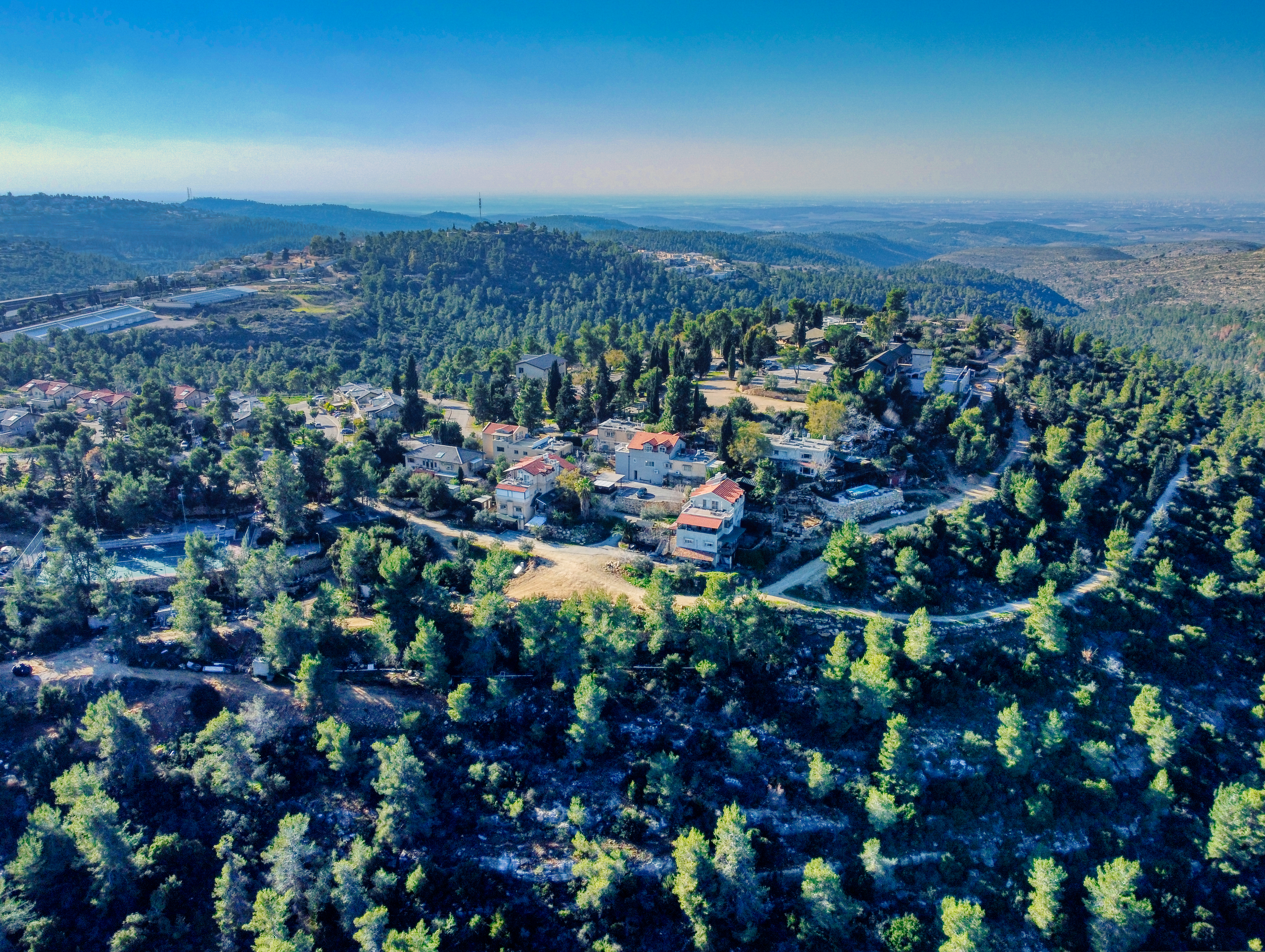
Yad HaShmona

== Activities ==
Yad HaShmona is a community and centre for Messianic Jews in Israel, with around 260 residents. The area is home to the Yad Hashmona Country Hotel and Restaurant and the Home of the Bible Translators.

=== Biblical garden ===
In 2000, a biblical garden was built at Yad Hashmona in cooperation with the Swiss Beit Shalom Association and the Israel Antiquities Authority (IAA).

The garden gives visitors a glimpse into the spiritual, physical and agricultural world of the Jewish people in Biblical times. It displays a variety of biblical plants and trees as well as reconstructed farms from biblical times. The garden includes an ancient wine press, an olive oil press, a 'mikveh' (ritual bath), a burial cave, an agricultural watchtower, a Galilean-style synagogue and a Bedouin tent.

== Economy ==
The community runs a guesthouse (Yad Hashmona Country Hotel), convention center and banquet hall. In 2000, a biblical village was inaugurated with the assistance of the Swiss Beth Shalom society and the Israel Antiquities Authority. A Biblical garden planted on the hillside replicates agriculture in ancient times. Apart from tourism, the economy is based on carpentry.

Jad-Hashmonan ystävät r.y (Friends of Yad HaShmona) supports Yad HaShmona with prayers from Finland and helps the village financially to implement mutually agreed projects.

== Litigation ==
In 2008, a lesbian couple married in the UK wanted to hold a wedding party for their friends and family at the banquet hall in Yad HaShmona. After Yad HaShmona learned the couple was not a straight couple, the venue cancelled the reservation, calling homosexuality "an abomination", among other things. The couple filed a lawsuit on grounds of discrimination based on sexual orientation. The lower court judge ruled in favour of the couple based on a year 2000 law forbidding discrimination in public places. In June 2014, the appeal by Yad HaShmona was denied by the Jerusalem District Court, which upheld the lower court's ruling on the case with a compensation 80,000 ₪ (around €20,000).

== Demography ==
According to 2014 data, the vast majority of the population in Yad ha-Shmona was Jewish (including the statistical category "other", which includes non-Arab residents of Jewish origin but without formal affiliation to the Jewish religion). Almost all the inhabitants are Messianic Jews.

It is a small village-type community with a long-standing stagnant population. As of 31 December 2014, 114 people lived here. During 2014, the population decreased by 1.7%.

Population development of Yad HaShmona
Year	1983	1995	2001	2003	2004	2005	2006	2007	2008	2009	2010	2011	2012	2013	2014
Population	47	69	85	86	85	88	93	92	100	94	97	95	112	116	114

== See also ==
- Finland-Israel relations
