= Jaguarão =

Municipality of Rio Grande do Sul, Brazil

- Municipality
- Municipality of Jaguarão
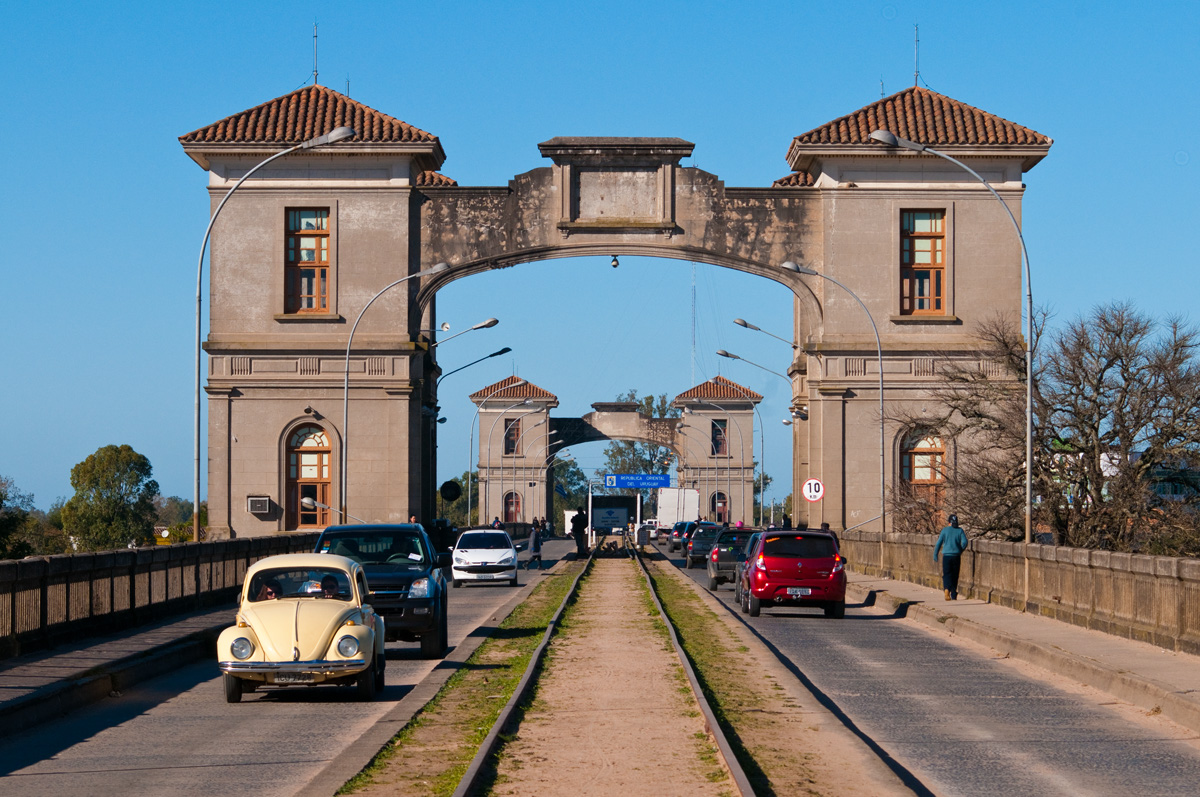
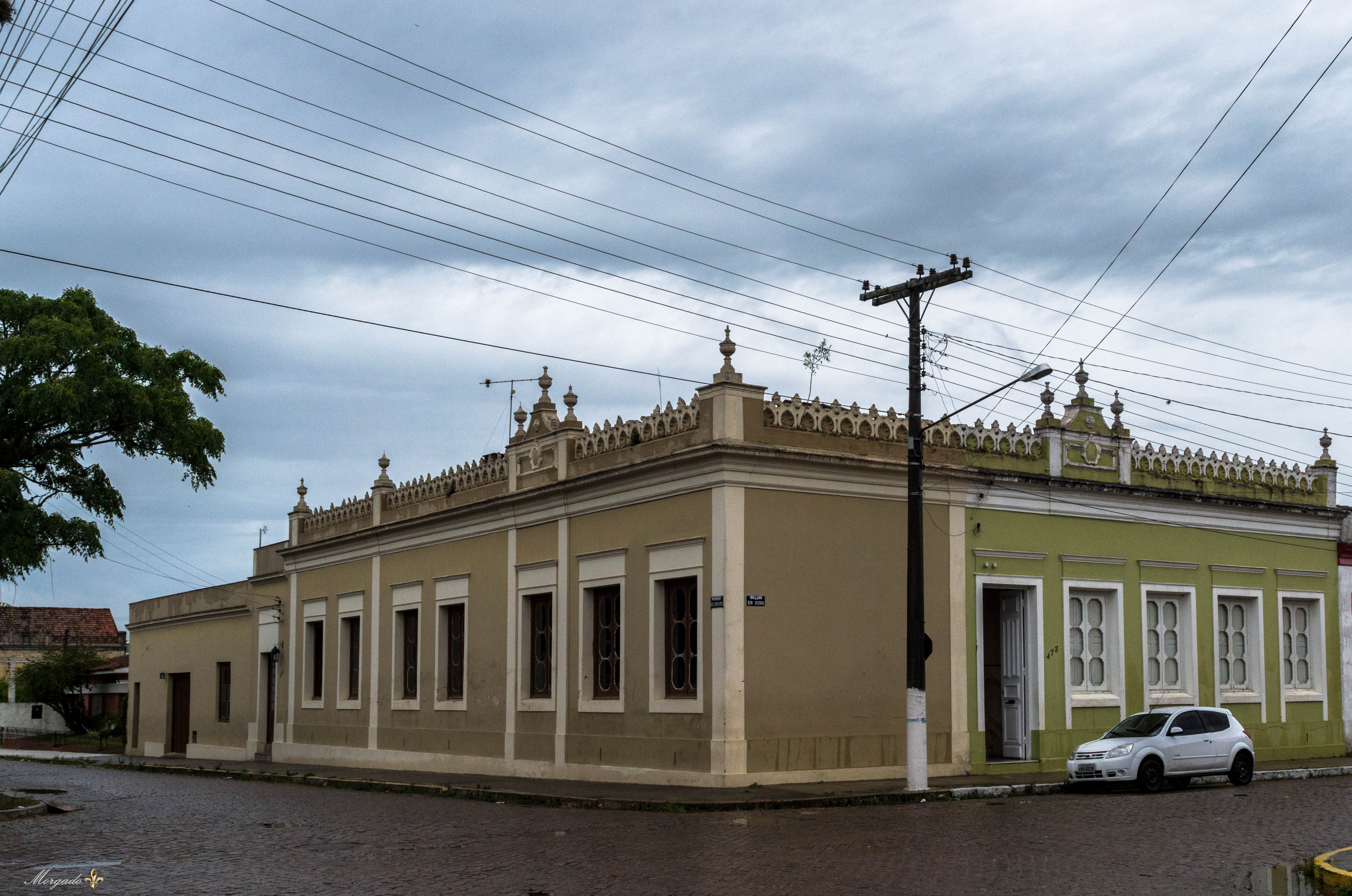
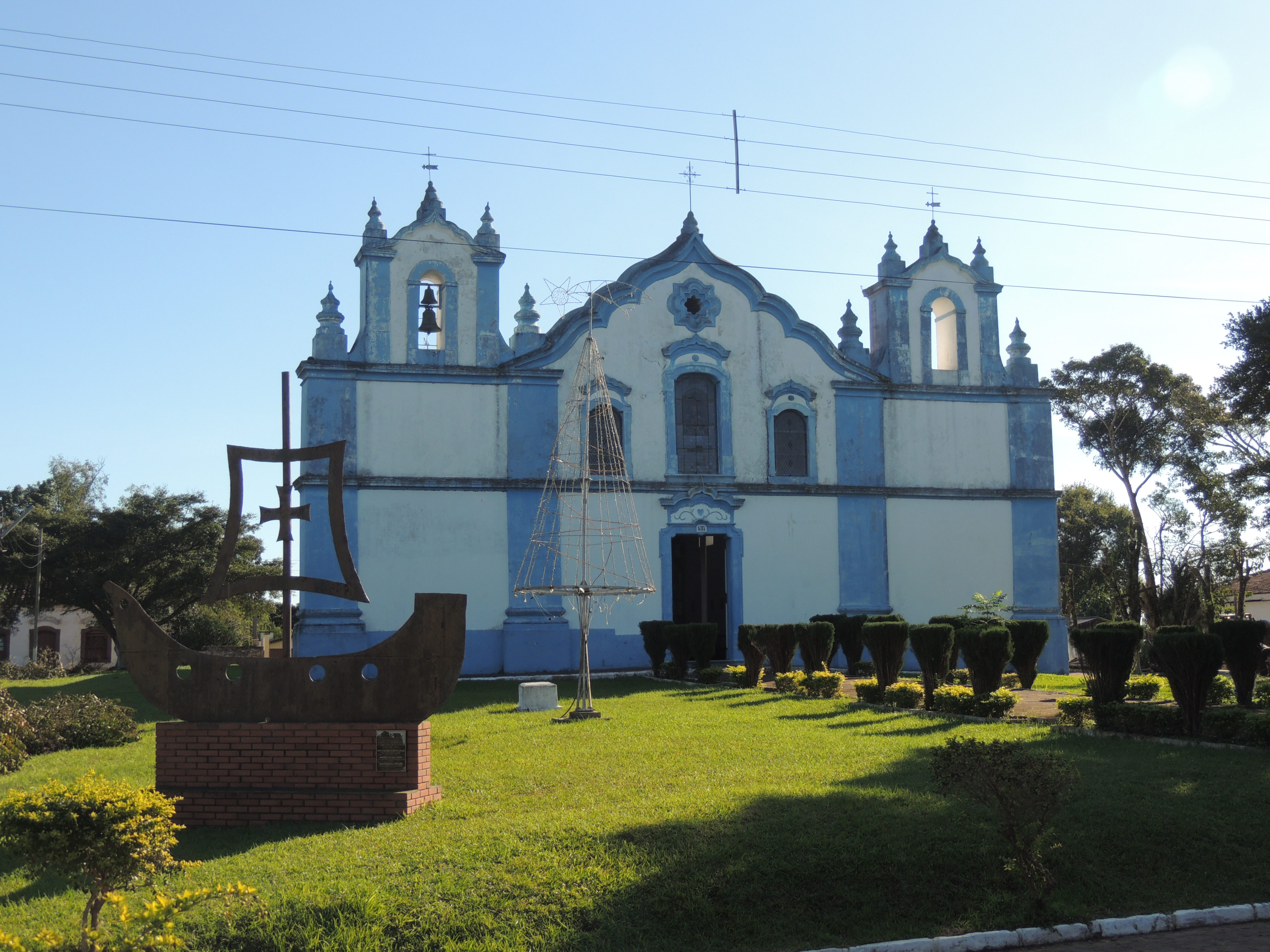
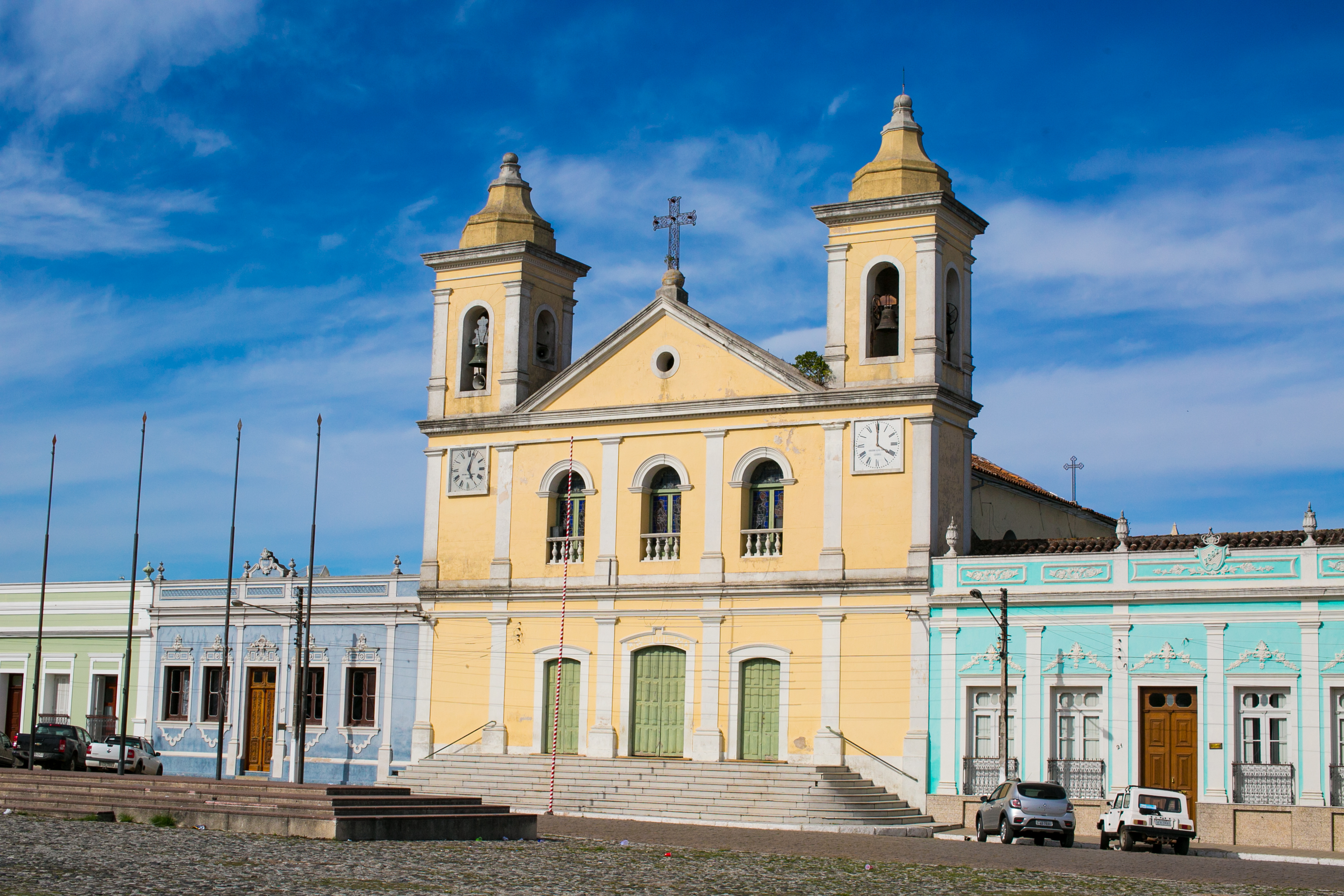
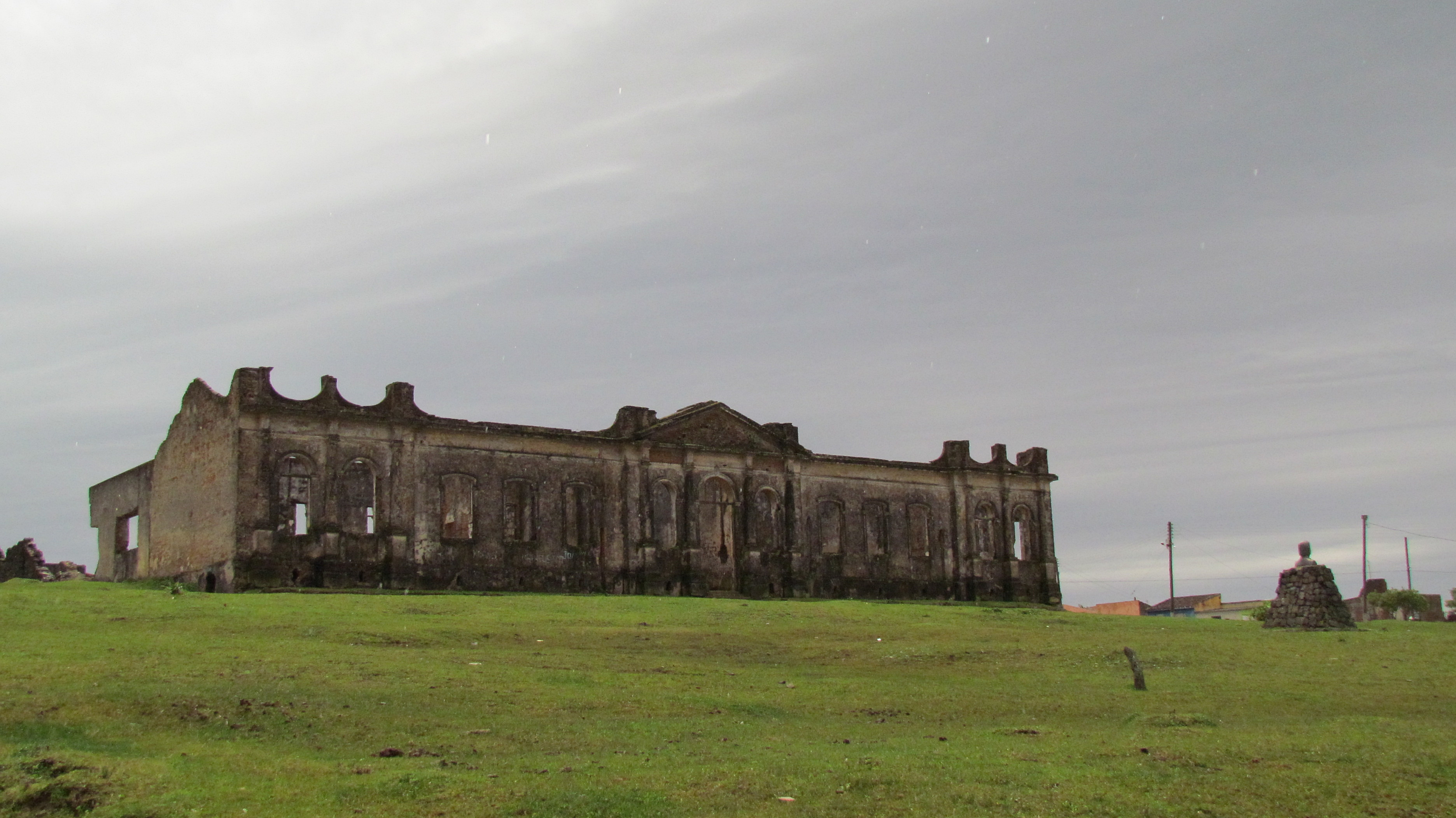
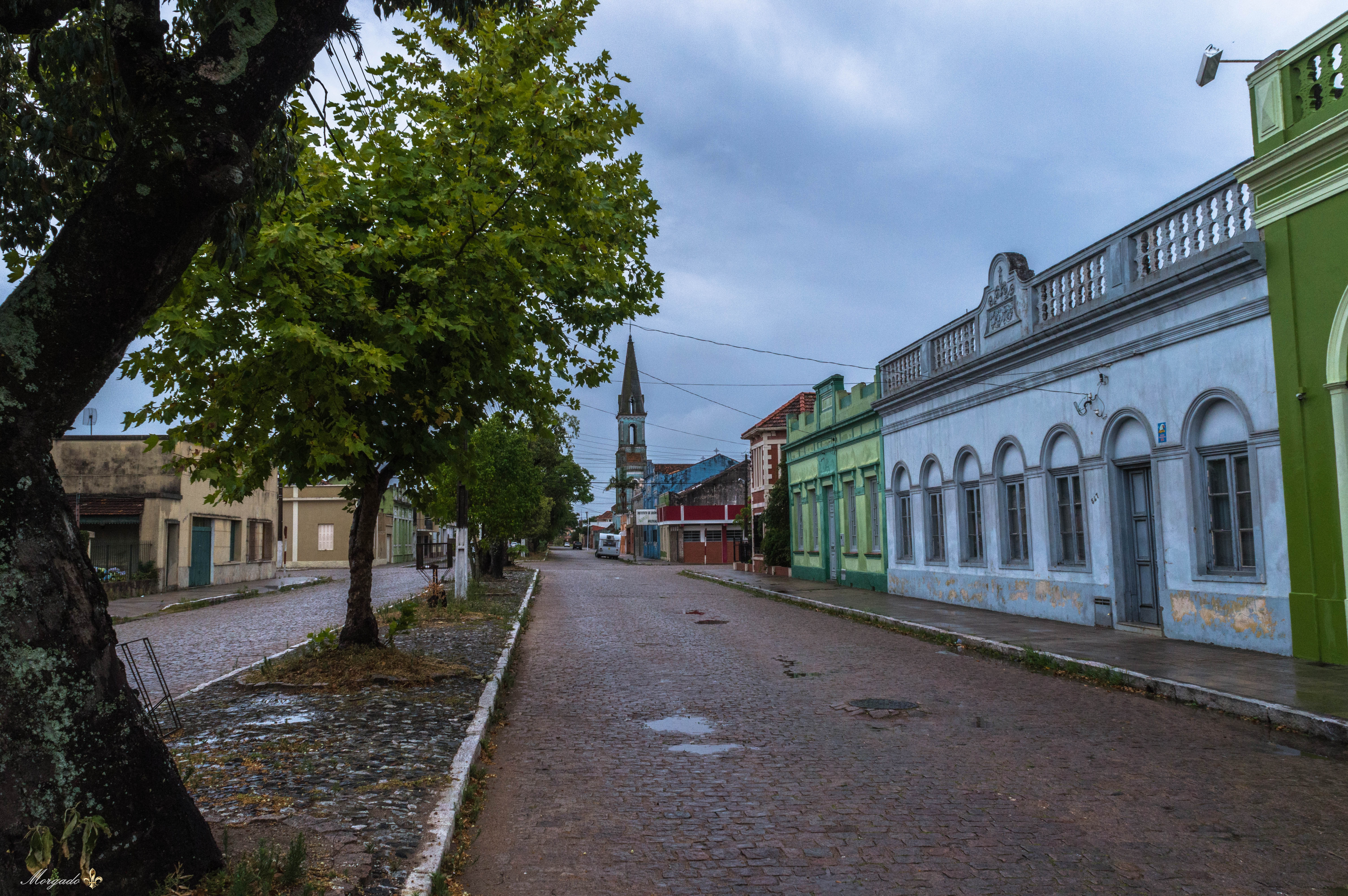

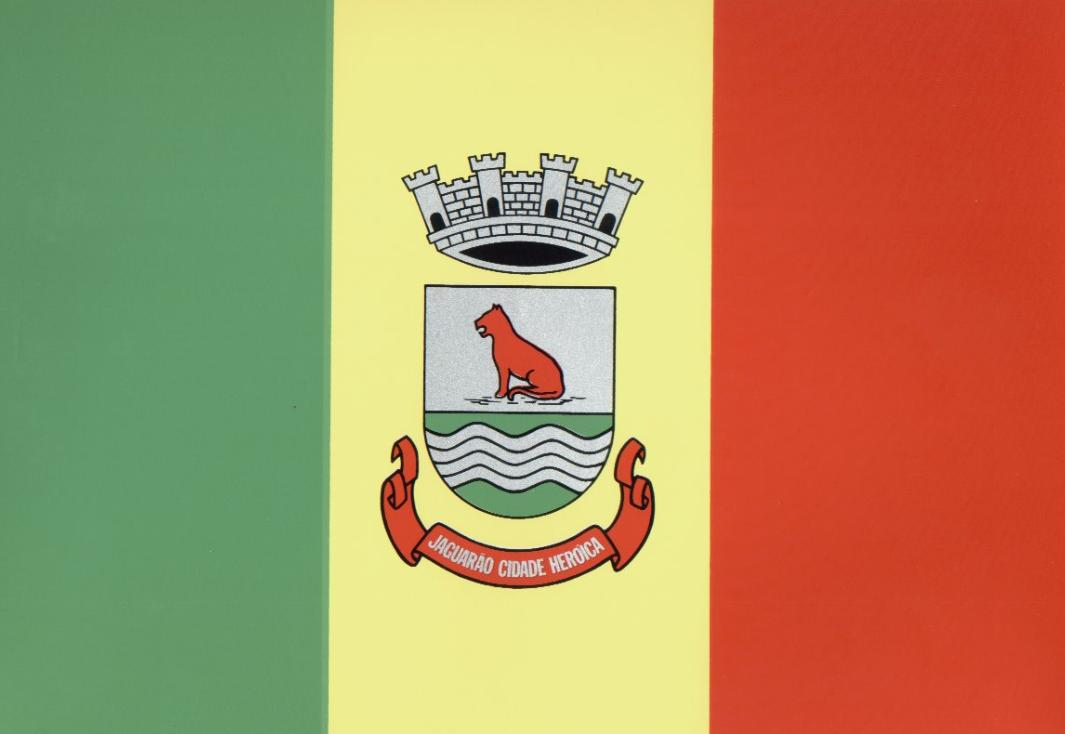
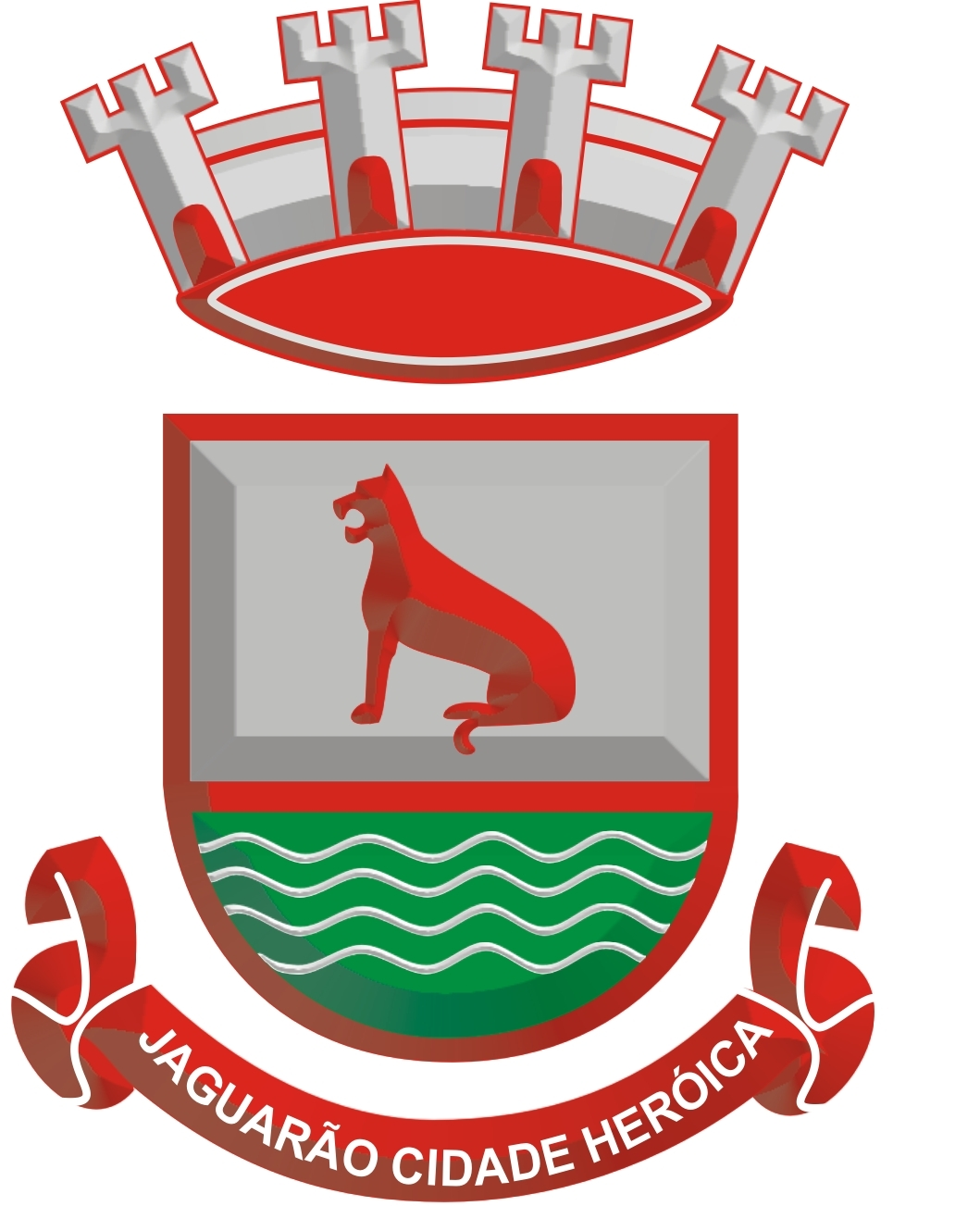
- Flag Coat of arms

- Location of Jaguarão in Rio Grande do Sul

- Location within Brazil
- Coordinates: 32°33′57″S 53°22′33″W
- Country: Brazil
- State: Rio Grande do Sul
- Mesoregion: Sudeste Rio-Grandense
- Microregion: Jaguarão

Government
  - Mayor: Cláudio Martins

Area
  - Total: 2,054.4 km^{2} (793.2 sq mi)

Population (2020)
  - Total: 26,500
  - Density: 12.9/km^{2} (33.4/sq mi)
- HDI (2010): 0.707 – high

Jaguarão (/ˌʒɑːɡwəˈraʊn/ ZHAH-gwə-ROWN; Portuguese pronunciation: [ʒaɡwɐˈɾɐ̃w]) is a municipality in the southern Brazilian state of Rio Grande do Sul located on the shores of the Jaguarão River, bordering Uruguay.

It lies a short distance inland from the Mirim Lagoon.

== Geographical and historical proximity to Uruguay ==
In 1865 it was the site of the Battle of Jaguarão, fought against Uruguayan forces.

Located in the extreme south of Brazil and the border with Uruguay, the Baron of Mauá International Bridge links it with Río Branco.

== Consular representation ==
Uruguay has a Consulate in Jaguarão.

== See also ==
- List of municipalities in Rio Grande do Sul
