= Brazil–Uruguay border =

International border

Coordinates: 30.0000°S 57.9167°W

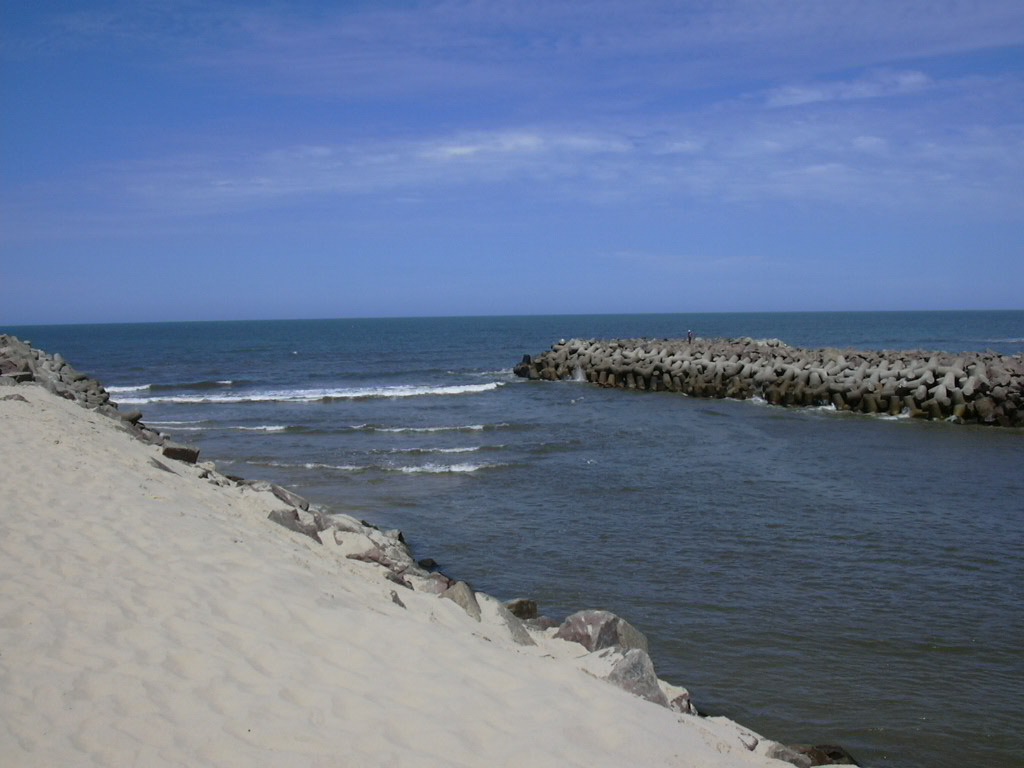
The Chui stream forms the border between Brazil and Uruguay.

The Brazil–Uruguay border is a strip of land located south of the southern Brazilian state of Rio Grande do Sul. It stretches for 985 km from the triple border Brazil-Argentina-Uruguay west to the mouth of Arroyo Chuí, the southernmost point in Brazil.

The western section of the border is marked by Quaraí River, a tributary of the Uruguay River and the "coxilhas of Santana." To the east, its border is marked by the Jaguarão River that flows into the Lagoa Mirim. The border then runs from southern portion of this lagoon to the Chui.

There are two disputed areas on the border between Brazil and Uruguay, which are the Brazilian Island and the Corner of Artigas (interfluve between the Quaraí River and the Arroyo Invernada). The two areas are administered by Brazil, yet are claimed for decades by Uruguay.

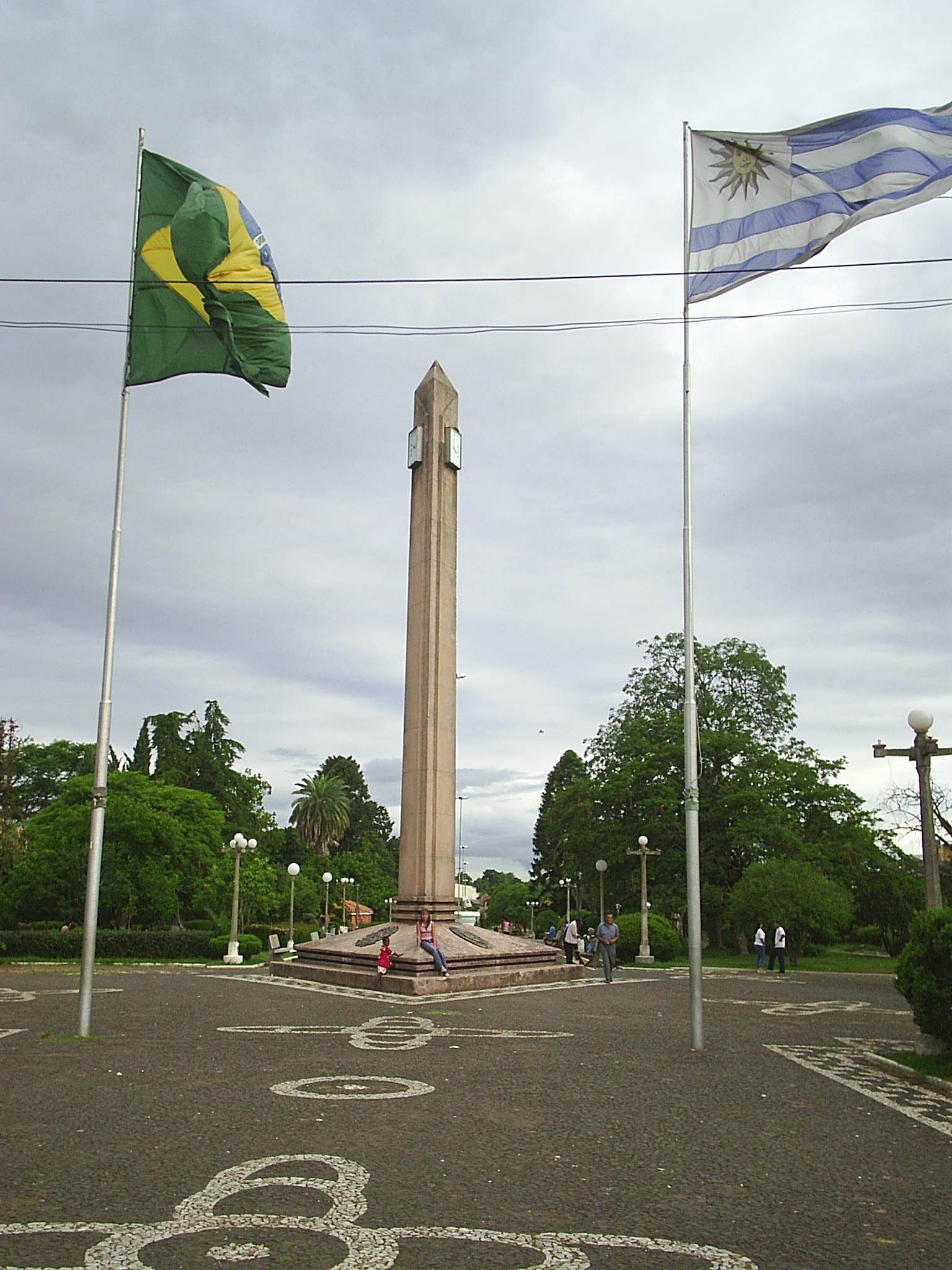
The boundary between Rivera and Santana do Livramento.

The border also runs through the Uruguayan city Rivera and the Brazilian city Santana do Livramento. Residents of these two cities are able to walk freely between the two countries without any border control. Those wishing to travel further inland into both countries must then undergo border control at designated points. Many duty-free shops are located in both cities. The same situation exists between the Brazilian city Chuí and the Uruguayan city Chuy.
