= Brazilian Uruguayans =

Brazilian community in Uruguay

Brazilian Uruguayans Uruguaios Brasileiros
Total population
- 43,412

Languages
- Brazilian Portuguese and Spanish

Religion
- Christianity (mainly Roman Catholicism)

Related ethnic groups
- Brazilian diaspora, Uruguayans

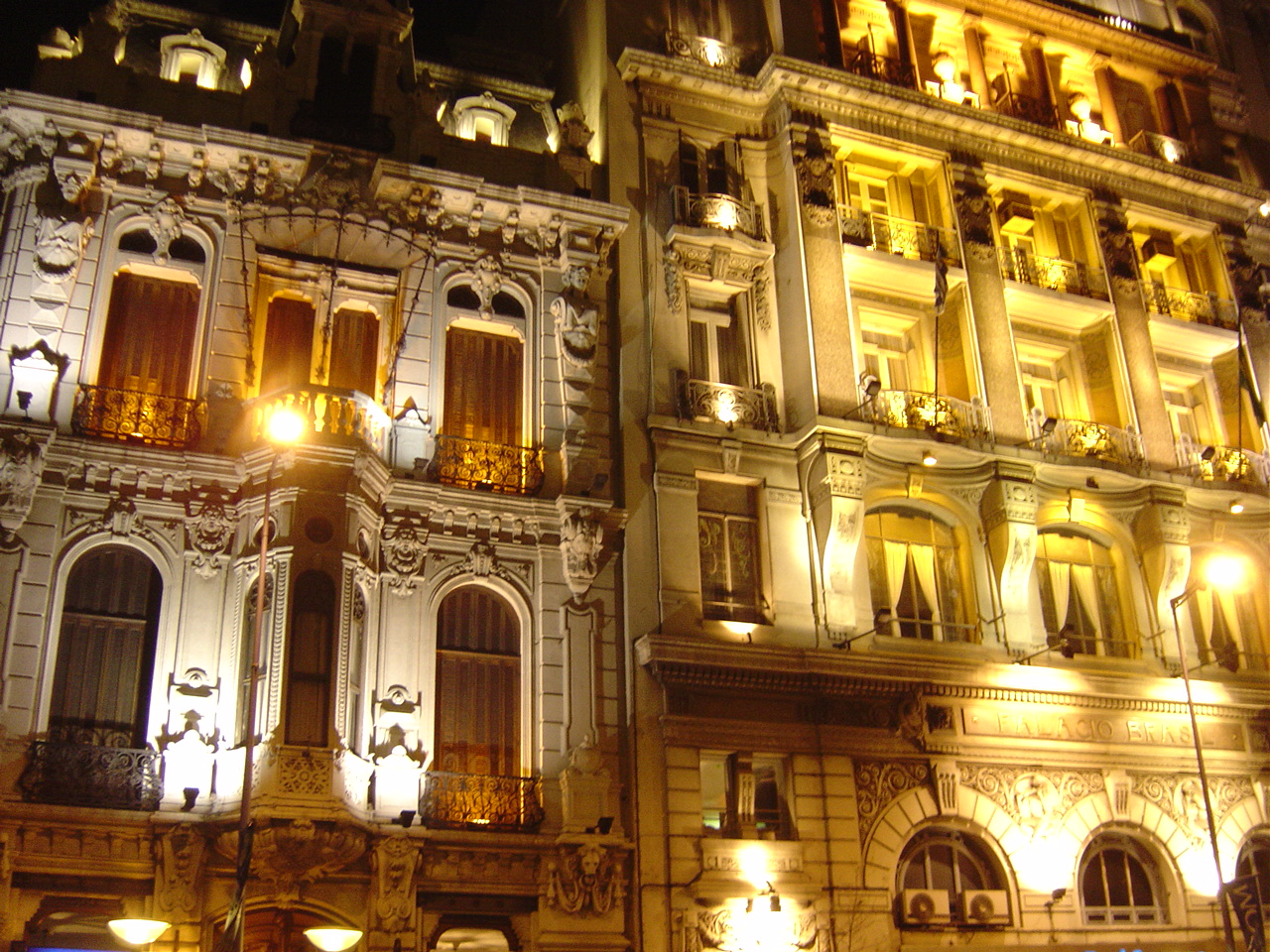
Palacio Braceras by night, Montevideo, headquarters of the Brazilian Club and the Uruguayan-Brazilian Cultural Institute.

Brazilian Uruguayans (Portuguese: Uruguaios Brasileiros) are people born in Brazil who live in Uruguay, or Uruguayan-born people of Brazilian descent.

== History ==
Many Brazilian-born people live in Uruguay, for a number of reasons. Above all, the frontier, which is one of the most permeable in the world; the neighboring cities of Rivera and Santana do Livramento, as a matter of fact, function closely as if they were a single big city. Then the languages spoken in both countries are mutually intelligible, with a hybrid variant, the Riverense Portuñol language. Historical reasons are also important: when the Southern Cone was disputed between the Spanish and Portuguese empires, a good portion of the territory of modern Uruguay changed hands several times. And, shortly before Uruguay was born as an independent nation, it was annexed to Brazil with the name of Cisplatine Province. Last, but not least, slavery was abolished early in Uruguay but persisted in Brazil for decades to come, so many Afro-Brazilian slaves escaped to Uruguay.

== Present ==
The 2011 Uruguayan census revealed 12,882 people who declared Brazil as their country of birth. As of 2013, there are over 1,600 Brazilian workers registered in the Uruguayan social security. Among schoolchildren born abroad, Brazilians are one of the most important groups, among 62 countries that are represented in Uruguayan schools.

Well-off Brazilians are increasingly choosing the international seaside resort Punta del Este to spend their summer holidays, some of them even as permanent residence.

There is a Uruguayan-Brazilian Cultural Institute in the center of Montevideo.

As of December 2025, nearly 3,000 Brazilian citizens applied for Uruguayan residency.

== Notable people ==
Past

- Aparicio Saravia (1856-1904), political leader, born in Uruguay to Brazilian parents

Present

- Juan Gómez Duarte (born 1955), lawyer and prosecutor
- Víctor Diogo (born 1958), footballer
- Fabián Coelho (born 1977), footballer
- Carlos Diogo (born 1983), footballer
- André Nunes (born 1984), Brazilian footballer in Cerro Largo
- Felipe Carvalho (born 1993), footballer
- Ronald Araújo (born 1999), footballer for FC Barcelona

== See also ==
- Brazil–Uruguay relations
- Uruguayan immigration to Brazil
