= Judiciary of Uruguay =

Government branch relating to law

The judiciary of Uruguay is a branch of the government of Uruguay that interprets and applies the laws of Uruguay, to ensure equal justice under law, and to provide a mechanism for dispute resolution. The legal system of Uruguay is a civil law system, with public law based on the 1967 Constitution, amended in 1989, 1994, 1997, and 2004. The Constitution declares Uruguay to be a democratic republic, and separates the government into three equal branches, executive, legislative and judicial. Private relationships are subject to the Uruguayan Civil Code, originally published in 1868. The Constitution defines the judiciary as a hierarchical system courts, with the highest court being a five-member Supreme Court, who are appointed by the legislative branch of the government, for ten-year terms. The Supreme Court appoints the judges of most of the lower courts. Below the Supreme Court, there are sixteen courts of appeal, each of which has three judges. Seven of the courts of appeal specialize in civil matters, four specialize in criminal matters, three cover labour law, and two focus on family matters. At the lowest tier are justices of the peace and courts of first instance specialized in administrative, civil, criminal, customs, juvenile, and labour cases. Although the hierarchy, all of them are functionally and structurally impartial, that is, the tribunal should not be interested in the object of the particular case, and the higher tribunal does not impose a behaviour nor precedent to the lower ones. There are also separate courts for auditing, elections and the military.

Elections in Uruguay are organized and supervised by a permanent and independent Electoral Court, which was established by an electoral law that was drafted in 1924, and was included in the 1932 constitution. The court has nine members of which five are non-partisan members elected by the parliament, the General Assembly of Uruguay. The other four members represent the major political parties in the General Assembly and are each selected by the legislators of their own parties. Below the Electoral Court are nineteen departmental electoral boards.

The Judiciary of Uruguay is possibly the most independent in Latin America, in part due to having its own budget. However, between 1977 and 1985, the military government severely curtailed the independence of the judiciary, by placing the judiciary under a justice ministry. Between 1905 and 1977, and from 1989 onwards, the selection of judges involved the legislature rather than the executive branch of government. Since 1997, it has been possible for Supreme Court judges to be re-elected after a gap of five years but only up to the age of 70.

== Structure ==
The judiciary of Uruguay consists of the Supreme Court of Justice, the Courts of Appeals, the District Courts (or Lawyer Courts), the Departmental Peace Courts and the Sectional Peace Courts. It also includes Conciliation Courts, Mediation Centers, and dependencies such as Public Defender Office and Forensic Technical Institute.

=== Supreme Court of Justice ===
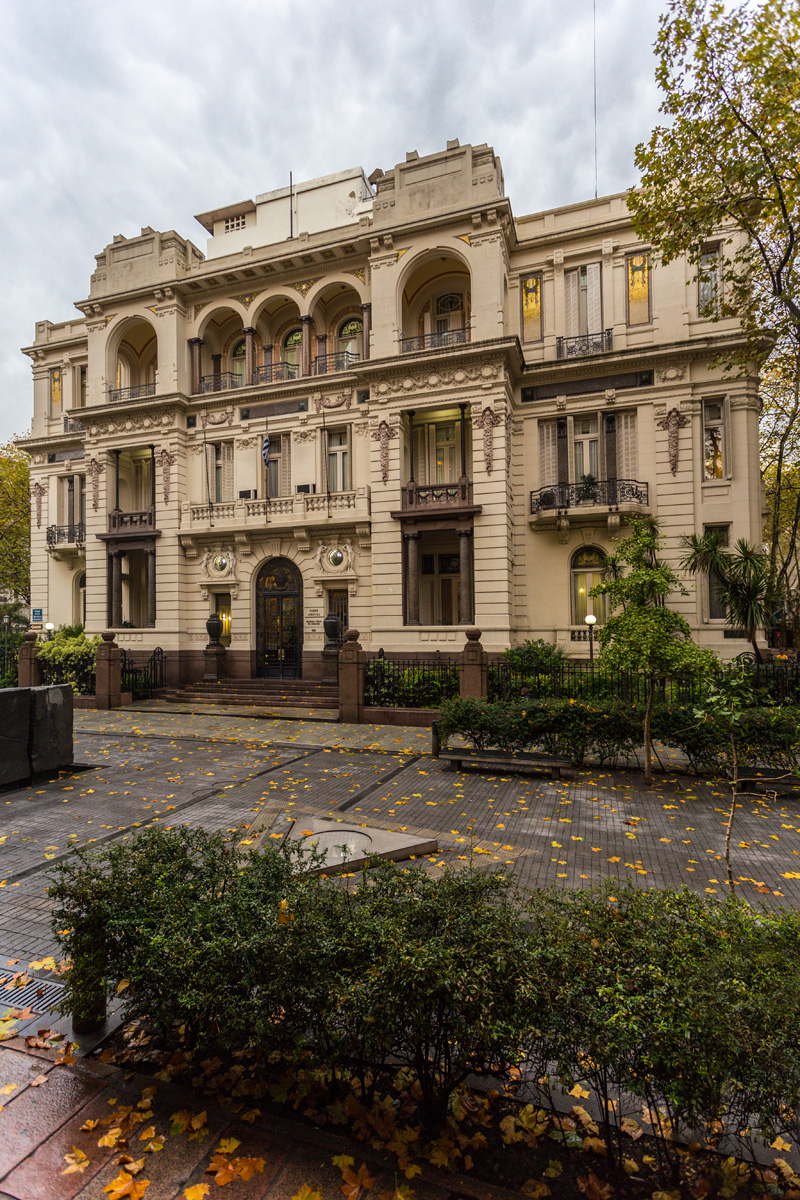
Palacio Piria, seat of the Supreme Court

The Supreme Court of Justice of Uruguay (Spanish: Suprema Corte de Justicia de Uruguay) is the highest court of law and last resort in the Oriental Republic of Uruguay. It serves as the highest appeals court, and appoints and oversees all other judges. Established on 28 October 1907, it is housed in the Palacio Piria, a masterpiece of eclectic architecture from 1917.

Article 235 of the Constitution establishes that members of the Supreme Court must be at least 40 years of age and either natural-born citizens or legal citizens with at least ten years of citizenship and twenty-five years of residence in the country. They must also have practiced law for a minimum of ten years or have served for at least eight years as a member of the Judiciary or the Public Ministry. Article 236 provides that justices are appointed by the General Assembly by a two-thirds vote of its full membership. Their term of office is ten years, and they are ineligible for re-election until five years have elapsed since the conclusion of their previous term. Their tenure also terminates upon reaching seventy years of age.

The presidency of the Court rotates annually among the justices, following the order of seniority in office.

=== Courts of Appeals ===
The Courts of Appeals (Spanish: Tribunales de Apelaciones) are collective bodies made up of three members each one, called "Ministers". Their basic legal framework is found in the XV section of the Constitution about the Judiciary and the III section of the Law no. 15750 (Organic Law of the Judiciary and the Courts Organization). They are not created by the Constitution itself but its existence is preempted by the article 241, which leaves their creation to a law.

To be a Minister of a Court of Appeals the person should be at least of 35 years of age, to have active natural citizenship or active legal citizenship for at least seven years, and to be a lawyer with eight years of experience or to have been a judge or a prosecutor for six years. The Supreme Court of Justice has the power to appoint, with the approval of the Senate or the Permanent Commission, the members of the Courts of Appeals by three out of five for candidates who are members of the Judiciary or the Attorney General's Office, or four out of five for other candidates.

The Constitution does not determine the number of Courts of Appeals, but each individual Court has been created by law. There are Courts of Appeals for Civil, Family, Labour and Criminal subject matters. Civil Courts of Appeals deal with civil, trade, finance, customs and administrative contentious issues. Family Courts of Appeals deal with family and minors. All Courts of Appeals have jurisdiction over the whole territory of the Republic, and they act as a second instance court, reviewing judicial decision of the lower tier courts (District Courts), being their rulings absolutely final, though their decisions are subject to the remedy of cassation before the Supreme Court of Justice.

=== District Courts ===
The District Courts, or First Instance Lawyer Courts (Spanish: Juzgados Letrados de Primera Instancia), are first instance courts that can be grouped in two categories: District Courts of Montevideo and those of the Interior of the country (other than Montevideo). District Courts of Montevideo are of Civil, Criminal, Organized Crime Specialized Criminal, Labour, Contentious Administrative, Family, Specialized Family, Customs, Juvenile, Bankruptcy, and Criminal Surveillance subject matters, whose jurisdiction is within Montevideo Department. District Courts in the Interior, on the other hand, are organized according their territorial jurisdiction, for example District Court of First Instance of Bella Unión for the First Turn or the District Court of First Instance of Rivera for the Seventh Turn, but these have usually assigned jurisdiction under several subject matters. They are not created by the Constitution itself but its existence is preempted by the article 244.

In order to be a judge of a District Court, of Montevideo or in the Interior, a person needs to be at least of 28 years of age, to have active natural citizenship or an active legal citizenship for at least four years, and to be a lawyer with four years of experience or to have been a judge of the peace or a prosecutor for two years.

== See also ==
- Supreme Court of Uruguay
- Politics of Uruguay

== Bibliography ==
- Abal Oliú, Alejandro (January 2008). Derecho Procesal [Procedural Law] (in Spanish). Vol. I. Montevideo: Fundación de Cultura Universitaria.
- Tarigo, Enrique E. (April 2010). Lecciones de Derecho Procesal Civil [Lessons of Civil Procedure Law] (in Spanish). Vol. I (6th ed.). Montevideo: Fundación de Cultura Universitaria. ISBN 978-9974-2-0187-X. OCLC 1040302845.
