= Uruguayan Brazilians =

Uruguayan Brazilian Uruguaio-brasileiro · Uruguayo-brasileño
Total population
- 50,512 Uruguayan citizens

Regions with significant populations
- Brazil: Mainly Southern · Southeastern Brazil

Languages
- Spanish · Portuguese

Religion
- Majority of Roman Catholicism some Protestantism · Others

Related ethnic groups
- Other Brazilian and Uruguayan people Other Hispanic Brazilians such as Argentine, Spanish, Paraguayan and Bolivian Brazilians; White Brazilians in general

Uruguayan Brazilian (Portuguese: Uruguaio-brasileiro, Spanish: Uruguayo-brasileño, Rioplatense Spanish: Uruguayo-brasilero) is a Brazilian person of full, partial, or predominantly Uruguayan ancestry, or a Uruguayan-born person residing in Brazil.

== History ==
Modern estimates put the figure of Uruguayans in Brazil at about 55,000.

There are many thousands of Uruguayan citizens who also have Brazilian citizenship and vote in elections in both countries.

== Notable people ==
- Aparicio Saravia, caudilho
- Carla Diaz, actress
- César Charlone, cinematographer
- Emílio Garrastazu Médici, President of Brazil, was son of a Uruguayan-born woman
- Giorgian de Arrascaeta, footballer
- Juan Figer, football agent
- Roger Ibañez, footballer

== See also ==
- Brazil–Uruguay relations
- Emigration from Uruguay
- White Brazilian
