= Revolution of 1904 =

Civil war in Uruguay

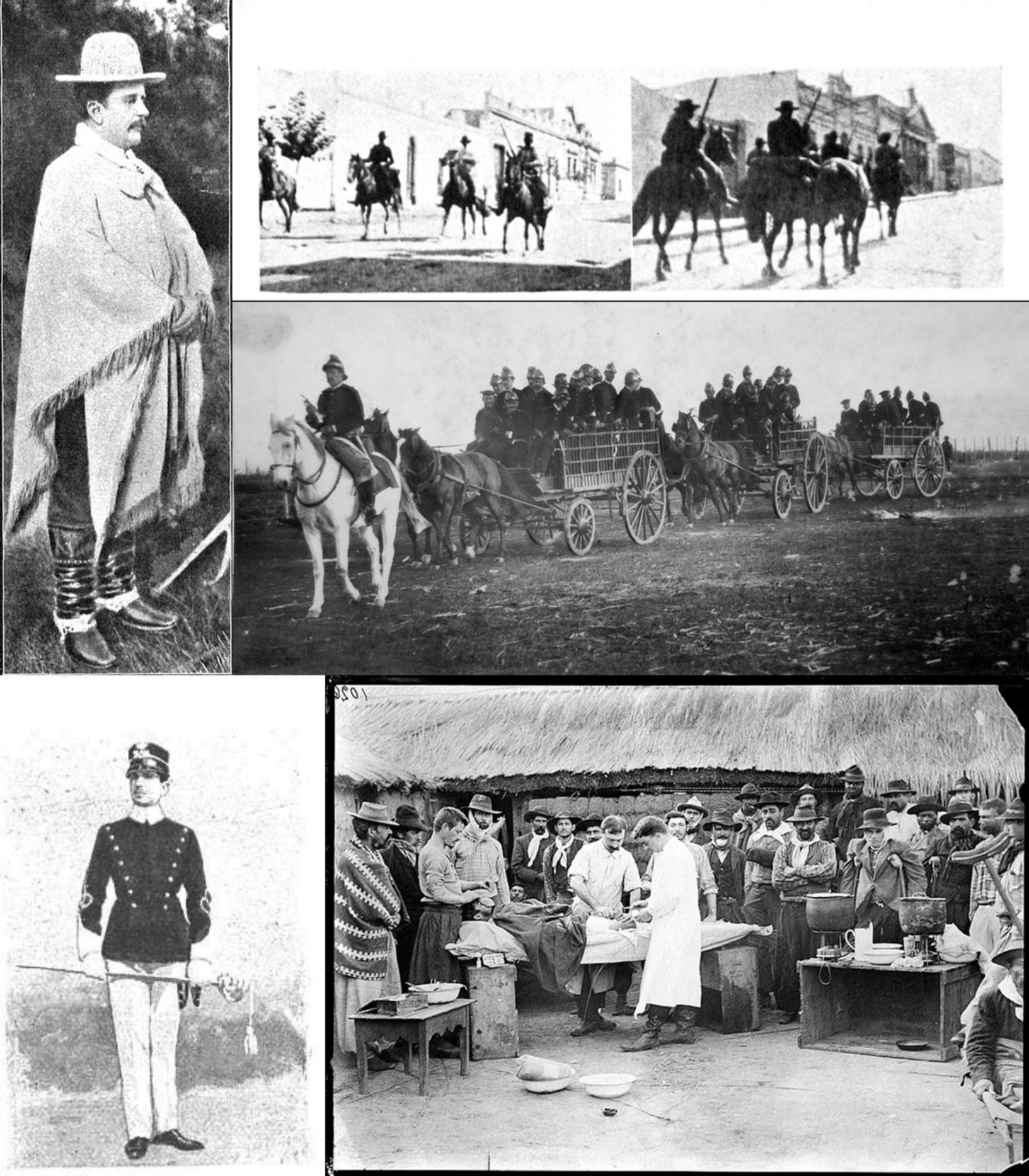
- Clockwise from top left: Last photograph of General Aparicio Saravia, taken during the revolution, Rebel patrols in the streets of Melo, Government forces during the revolution, Campaign Hospital of the National Party, Lieutenant Oscar Muñoz Caravia, who died during the Battle of Masoller.
Date	3 January 1904 - 24 September 1904
Location	Uruguay
Result	Government Victory

Belligerents
Blanco Revolutionaries	(Uruguay) Uruguayan Government

Commanders and leaders
Aparicio Saravia (DOW); Abelardo Márquez; Dionisio Viera; José González; Bernardo Gervasio Berro; Manuel Macedo; Basilio Muñoz; José María Pampillón	José Batlle y Ordóñez; Eduardo Vázquez; Manuel Benavente; Justino Muniz; Pablo Galarza; Guillermo Buist; Basilicio Saravia; Oscar Muñoz Caravia

Units involved
Blanco Army	Government Army

Strength
10,000	25,000

The Revolution of 1904 was a civic-military revolt led by Aparicio Saravia against the government of President José Batlle y Ordóñez in Uruguay. It was the last military conflict between Blancos and Colorados.

== History ==
It was the bloodiest of the revolutions that occurred in Uruguay, with large numbers of casualties and injuries on both sides. On June 6, 1904, took place the Battle of Guayabos (Salto Department), in which the saravista colonel Abelardo Márquez, was defeated by government troops.

In the Battle of Tupambaé, General Aparicio Saravia faced the troops of General Pablo Galarza in the department of Cerro Largo. Saravia was wounded during the Battle of Masoller, and died several days later in Santana do Livramento, Brazil. The armistice was signed on September 24, 1904.

Several sons of Aparicio Saravia fought in the ranks of the revolutionary army. His brother Basilicio Saravia, served in the government army.

== Gallery ==
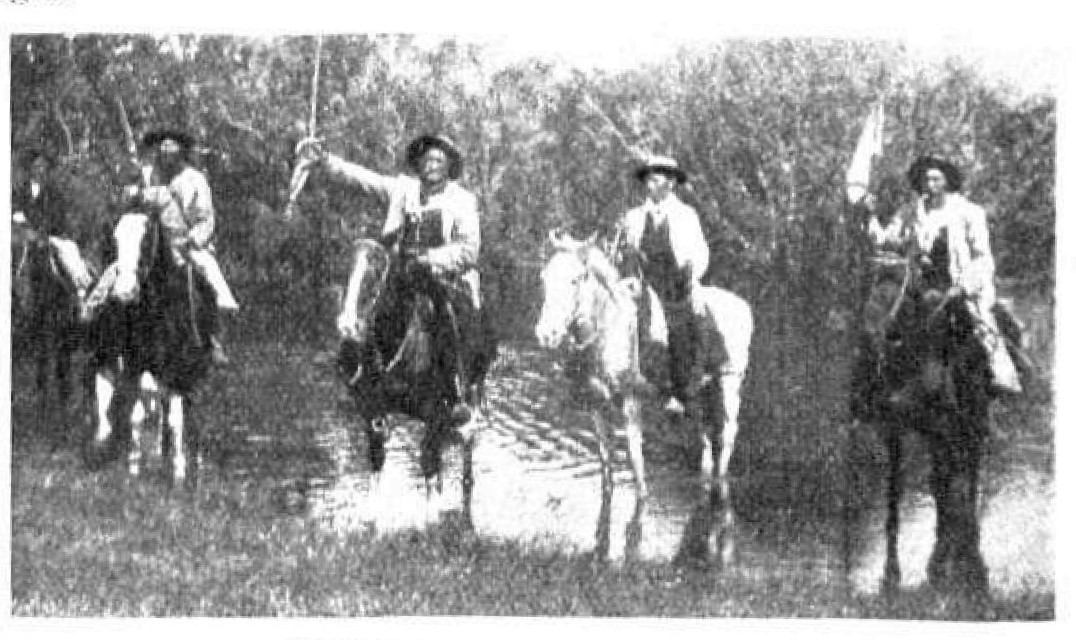
Colonel Manuel Macedo Fuliáo, and sons during the Revolution of 1904

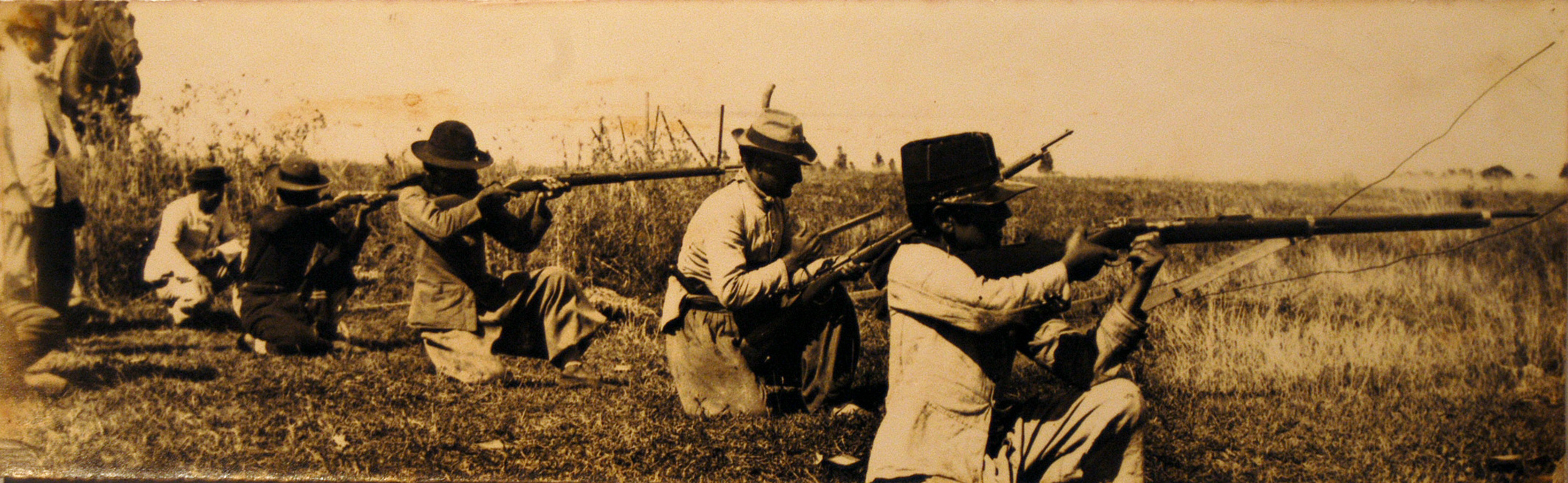
Shooting practice of Saravistas forces

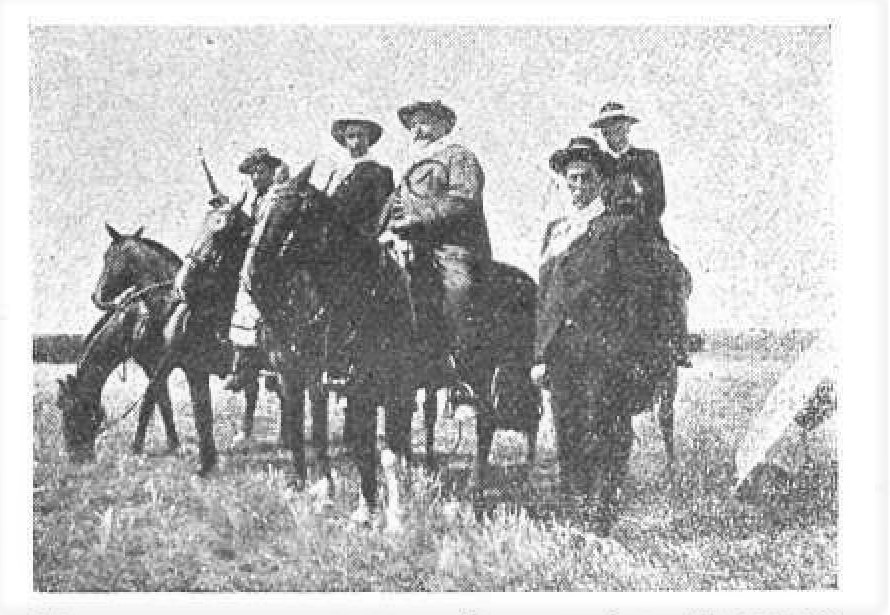
José F. González, saravista colonel

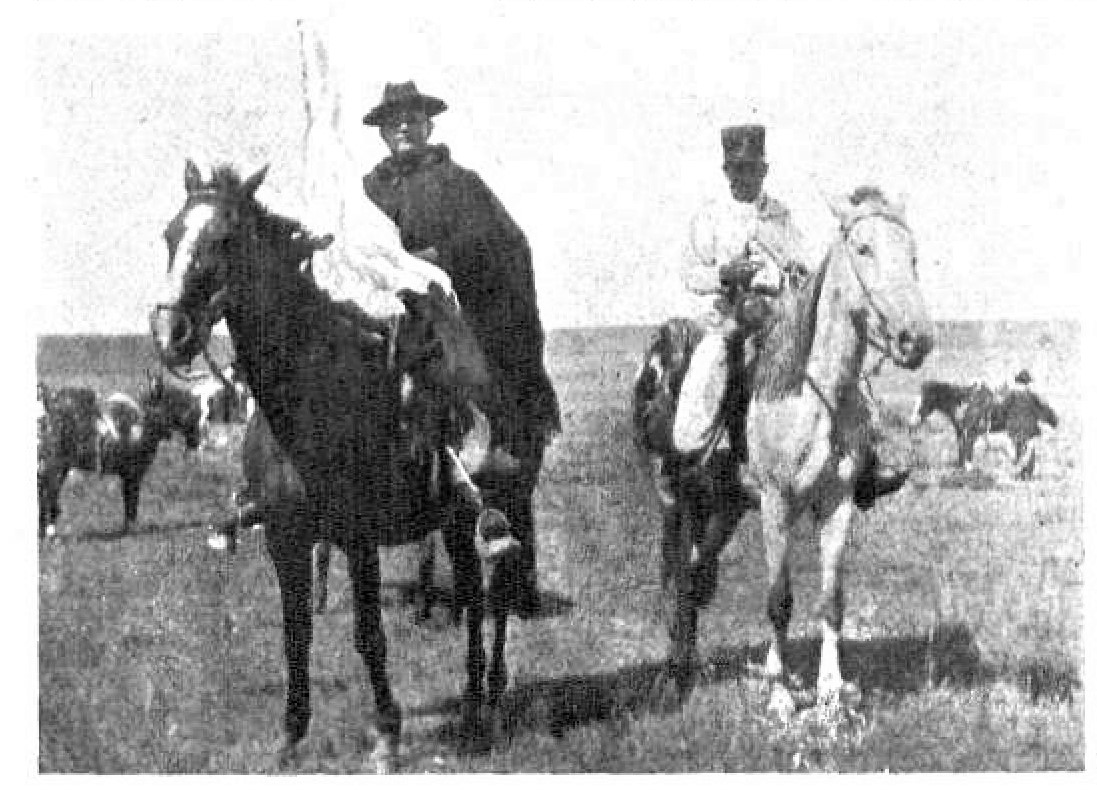
Basilicio Saravia head of one of the divisions of the Uruguayan army

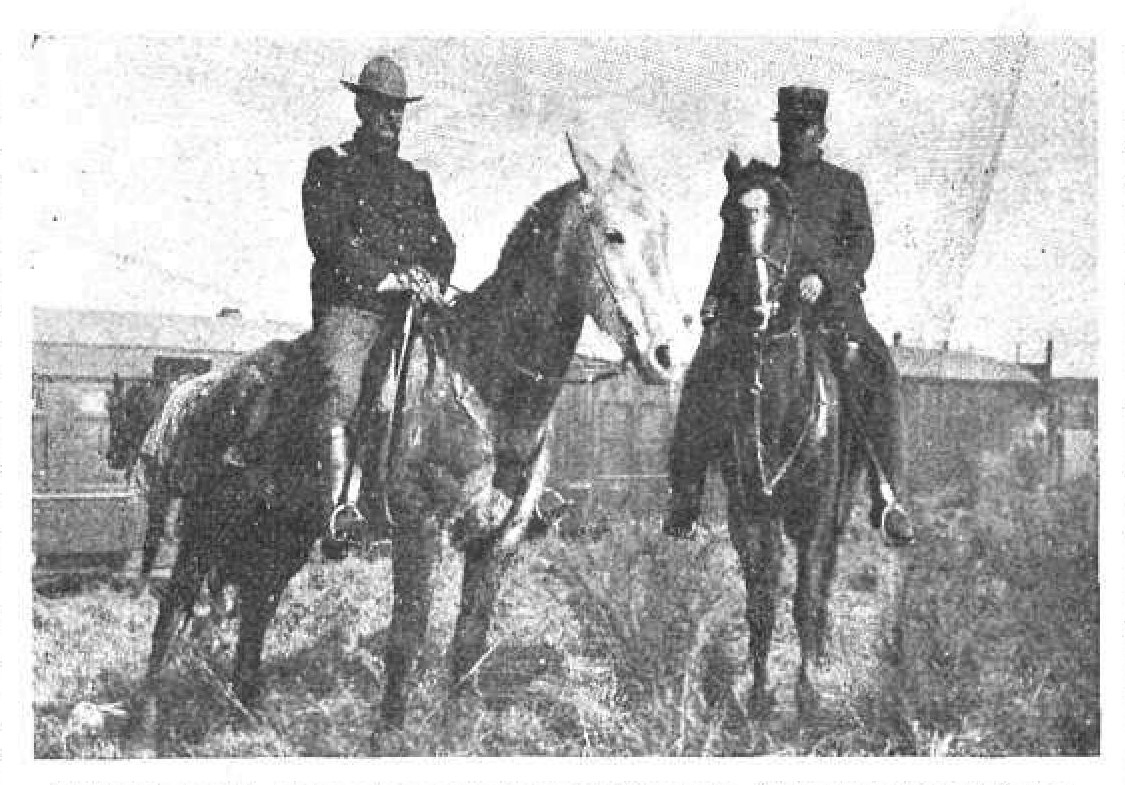
Guillermo Buist, colonel of government forces

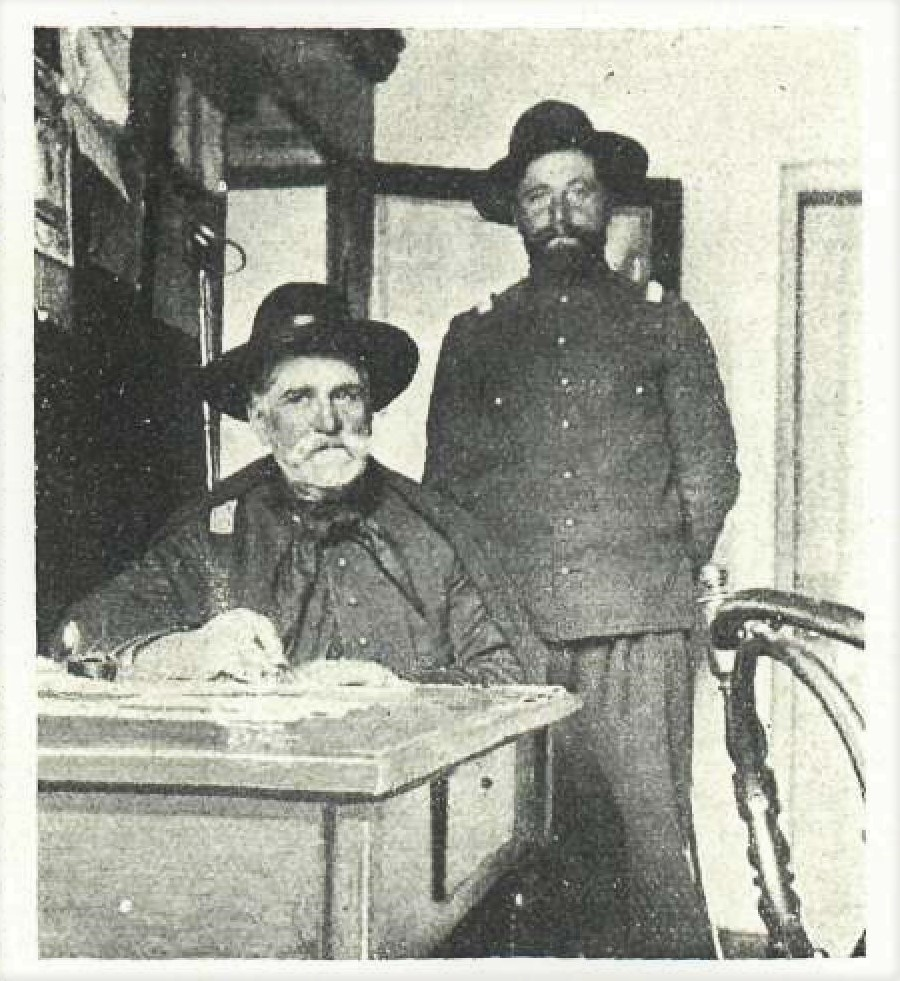
General Eduardo Vázquez of the Uruguayan Army

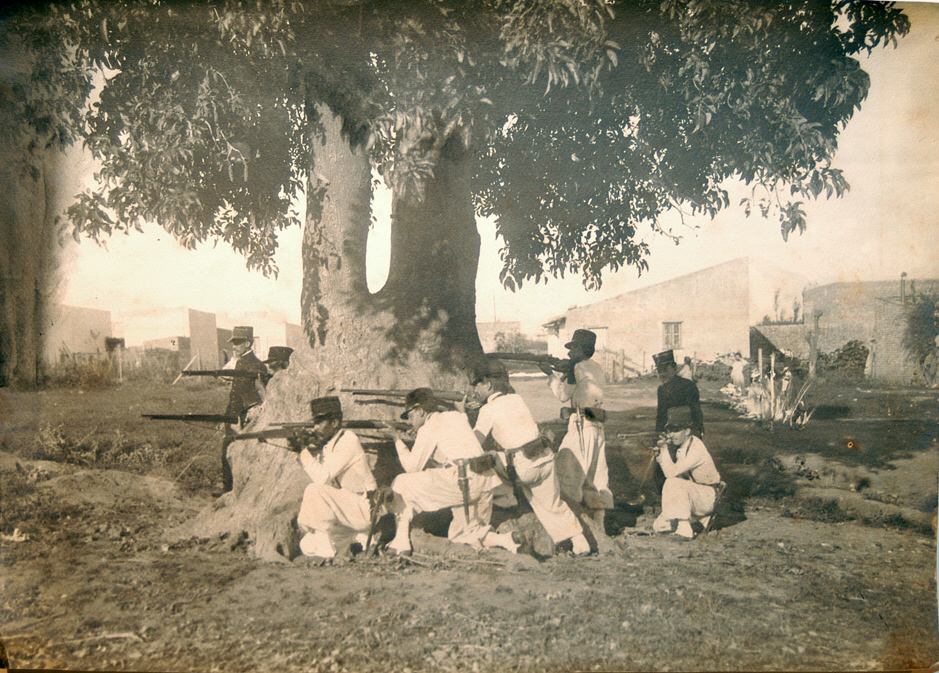
Shooting practices of government army forces
