= Juan Gómez Duarte =

Uruguayan prosecutor

Juan Gómez
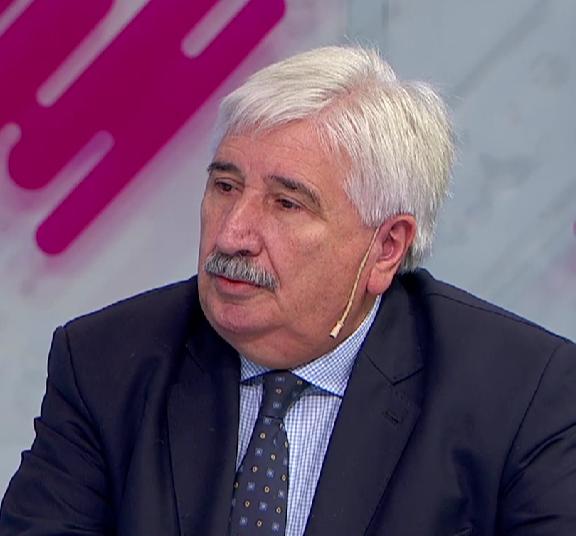
- Gómez Duarte in 2022

Attorney General of Uruguay
- Incumbent
- Assumed office 6 October 2021
- Preceded by: Jorge Díaz Almeida

Personal details
- Born: Juan Bautista Gómez Duarte; 29 June 1955 (age 69); Tranqueras, Uruguay
- Education: University of the Republic

Juan Bautista Gómez Duarte (born 29 June 1955) is a Uruguayan lawyer and prosecutor, currently serving as Attorney General of Uruguay since October 6, 2021.

== Early life and education ==
Juan Bautista Gómez Duarte was born on June 29, 1958, in the rural area of Tranqueras, Rivera Department. He is one of seven children born to Antón Gomez and Luisa "Anita" Duarte. He is of Brazilian descent through his father. At the age of seven he underwent heart surgery.

He attended Rivera Department public schools and at the age of 19 he enrolled at the University of the Republic to study law.

== Career ==
He began working as a civil servant in the Attorney General's Office in 1975 while studying at the university. In 1997 he became a prosecutor and was assigned as a prosecutor in the city of Rivera until 2000. Then he was assigned until 2009 as a Departmental Prosecutor of Maldonado. In office he prosecuted Guillermo Coppola for obstruction of justice.

From 2009 to 2012 he served as National Prosecutor of the Criminal Prosecutor's Office of Montevideo. In 2012 he was appointed head of the Special Prosecutor's Office for Organized Crime, a position in which he prosecuted well-known personalities such as the football executive Eugenio Figueredo, and the Minister of Economy of José Mujica's administration, Fernando Lorenzo. In 2016 he was promoted as head of the Montevideo Criminal Prosecutor's Office and a year later of the Criminal Homicide Prosecutor's Office.

In April 2021 he was appointed Deputy Attorney General to then-incumbent Jorge Díaz Almeida, who resigned from the position in October. Due to this, Gómez took over as interim, pending the nomination of a new one, which corresponds to the Executive with the approval of the Senate. However, since then no consensus has been achieved between all parliamentary groups.

== Personal life ==
Gómez is married to lawyer Laura Bentos, and they have two daughters, Daniela and Josefina. On December 27, 2023, he was hospitalized due to a health condition and it was announced that he would require "prolonged treatment."
