= 1851 Boundary Treaty (Brazil–Uruguay) =

1851 treaty between Brazil and Uruguay

The 1851 Boundary Treaty established between Brazil and Uruguay as a result of the Uruguayan Civil War and conflicts with Brazil and Argentina; the result of the treaty was a step towards the acceptance of Uruguay's independence from neighboring territories.

== Treaties ==
Uruguay rewarded Brazil's financial and military support by signing five treaties in 1851 that provided for perpetual alliance between the two countries. The Treaty of Montevideo (1828) confirmed Brazil's right to intervene in Uruguay's internal affairs. The treaties also allowed joint navigation on the Uruguay River and its tributaries, and tax exempted cattle and salted meat exports. The treaties also acknowledged Uruguay's debt to Brazil for its aid against the Blancos, and Brazil's commitment for granting an additional loan. In addition, Uruguay renounced its territorial claims to a border in the Ibicuí River and accepted the Quaraí River as northernmost border with Brazil, thereby reducing its area the size of the Cisplatina Province, and recognized Brazil's exclusive right of navigation in the Lagoa Mirim and the Jaguarão River, the natural border between the countries. However, a dispute still exists in the vicinity of Masoller over which creek was meant to mark the border in that area. Uruguay also allowed Brazilians to legally own slaves in their properties despite the fact that after 1842 slavery wasn't legal in the country.
