= Barra do Quaraí =

Town in Rio Grande do Sul, Brazil

- Municipality
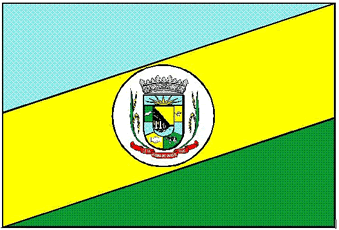
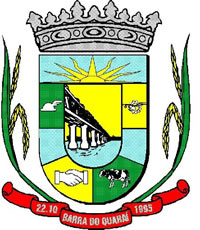
- Flag Coat of arms

- Location of Barra do Quaraí
- Coordinates: 30°12′25″S 57°33′18″W
- Country: Brazil
- Region: South
- State: Rio Grande do Sul
- Founded: December 28, 1995

Government
  - Mayor: Iad Mahoud Abder Rahim Choli

Area
  - Total: 1,056.14 km^{2} (407.78 sq mi)
- Elevation: 35 m (115 ft)

Population (2020)
  - Total: 4,227
  - Density: 4.002/km^{2} (10.37/sq mi)
- Time zone: UTC−3 (BRT)
- HDI (2000): 0.777 – medium

Barra do Quaraí (also Quarahim in archaic Portuguese spelling) is a Brazilian municipality located near the border with Uruguay (on the Rio Quaraí) and Argentina on the Uruguay River. The town became the westernmost city in the state of Rio Grande do Sul and in all Southern Brazil when it was separated from the municipality of Uruguaiana on December 28, 1995. The population is 4,227 (2020 est.) in an area of 1056.14 km^{2}. Its elevation is 35 m. It is located 717 km west of the state capital of Porto Alegre, and roughly the same distance northwest of Montevideo, Uruguay. Under Brazilian law, the municipality includes an island named Ilha Brasileira, also claimed by Uruguay, where it is known as Isla Brasilera.

== See also ==
- Brazilian Island
- List of municipalities in Rio Grande do Sul
