= Attorney General's Office of Uruguay =

- Fiscalía General de la Nación
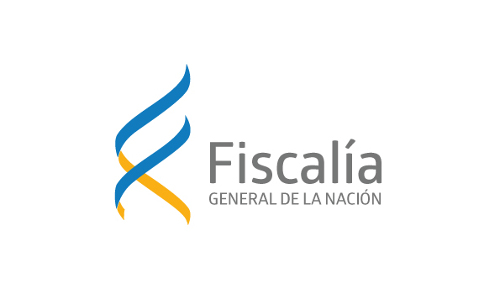

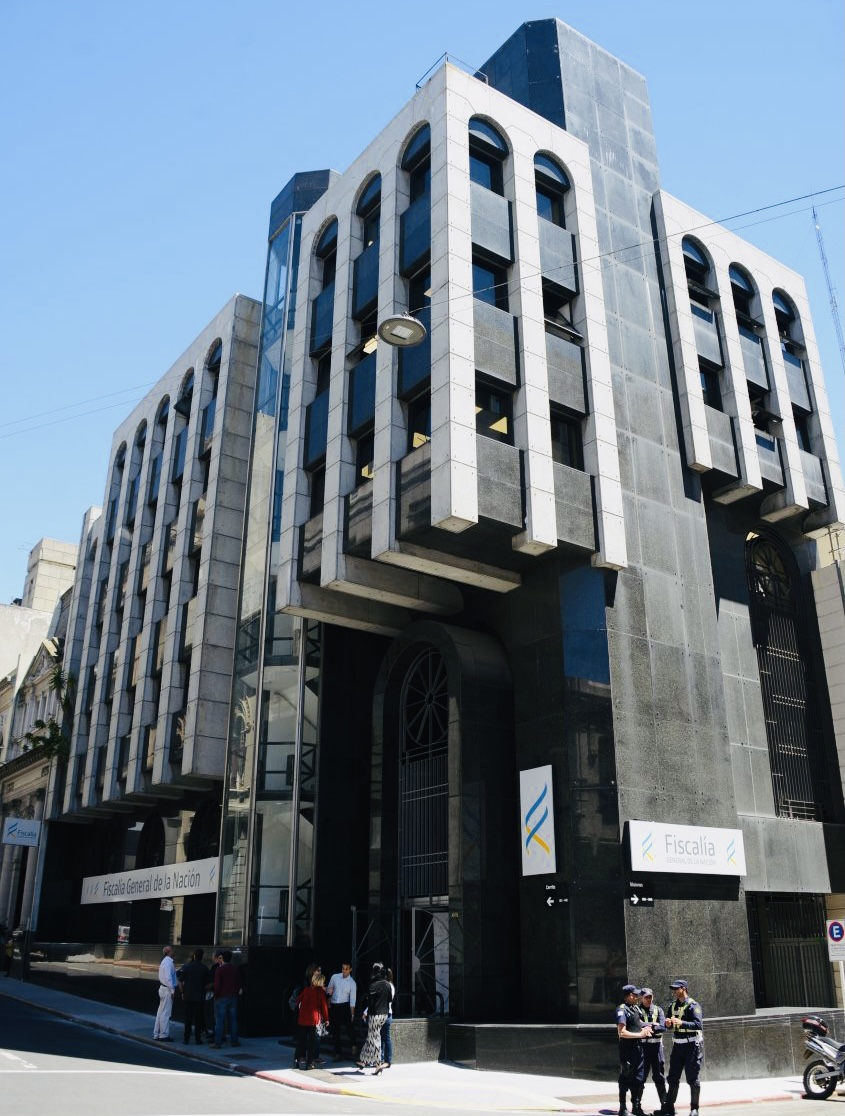

Decentralized service overview
- Jurisdiction: Uruguay
- Headquarters: 1283 Paysandú Street, Montevideo
- Employees: 706
- Decentralized service executive: Juan Gómez Duarte, Attorney General
- Website: www.gub.uy/fiscalia-general-nacion/

The Attorney General's Office of Uruguay (Spanish: Fiscalía General de la Nación; literally "General Prosecutorial Office of the Nation") is the Uruguayan government agency that prosecutes offenders, investigate crimes and accuse criminal law infractions against judges and courts of justice. It was created by Law No. 19,438 as a decentralized service.

== History ==
The Attorney General's Office as the Public Ministry was created in 1907 during the administration of President Claudio Williman by the same law that created the High Court –predecessor of the Supreme Court–. Until 2015, it was an agency dependent on the Ministry of Education and Culture, but with the promulgation of Law No. 19,334, it was established as a decentralized state service, not being part of any of the three branches of government.

== Attorney General ==
Article One Hundred and Sixty-Eight of the Constitution of Uruguay establishes that it is the responsibility of the Executive to appoint the Attorney General (Spanish: Fiscal de Corte y Procurador General de la Nación; literally "Court Prosecutor and Attorney General of the Nation").

Article 46 of Law 19,483 establishes that to serve as General Attorney a person must be at least 40 years old, be natural-born citizens (or be legal citizens with ten years exercise thereof and twenty-five years of residence in the country), and have been a lawyer for ten years, or as such to have been a member of the Judiciary, the Public or Fiscal Ministry for a period of eight years.
