= Battle of Masoller =

1904 battle of the Aparicio Saravia revolt

- Part of the Revolution of 1904
Date	1 September 1904
Location	Masoller, Uruguay
Result	Colorado victory

Belligerents
Blancos	Colorados

Commanders and leaders
Aparicio Saravia	José Batlle y Ordóñez; Oscar Muñoz Caravia †

The Battle of Masoller, which occurred on 1 September 1904, was the final battle of the Aparicio Saravia revolt, resulting in the victory of the Colorado forces.

== Location and historical background ==
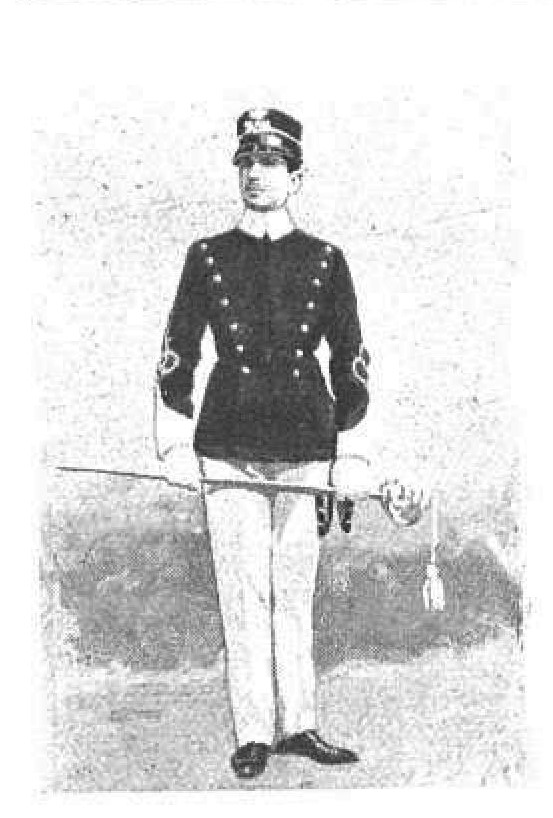
Oscar Muñoz Caravia, government's military officer who died in the Battle of Masoller

Masoller is a village in northern Uruguay, close to the border with Brazil. The proximity of the Brazilian border proved significant for the outcome of the battle, because the defeated Blanco general, Aparicio Saravia, retired injured from the battle and fled to Brazil. The victorious Colorado forces were reluctant to pursue the injured leader of the Blanco forces because they resolved to keep the conflict within Uruguay's borders and avoid an incident with the Brazilian Government. Saravia died of wounds in Brazil on 10 September 1904.

The Battle of Masoller also marked the political consolidation of the Presidency of the liberal José Batlle y Ordóñez, and more broadly of the Colorado Party.

== Feature in work by Jorge Luis Borges ==
This battle figures in La otra muerte, a short story by Argentine writer Jorge Luis Borges, in his collection El Aleph. The story concerns a certain Pedro Damián, whose personal history initially appears to have been one of a coward who fled the cannon fire at the Battle of Masoller, to survive as a virtual hermit until his death nearly forty years later. During the course of the story, however, the narrator finds that this same history has somehow spontaneously converted into the tale of a hero who died at the head of the charge in the same Battle of Masoller in 1904: the underlying idea of Borges is that personal and historical memory is complex.

La otra muerte addresses the relationship between the present and history and the question of how a single event can change, or be perceived to change, an infinite number of destinies, Characteristically, Borges chose for this story a military event ubiquitously interpreted as determining the course of twentieth-century Uruguay.

== See also ==
- Masoller dispute
