= Avelino Arredondo =

Uruguayan assassin

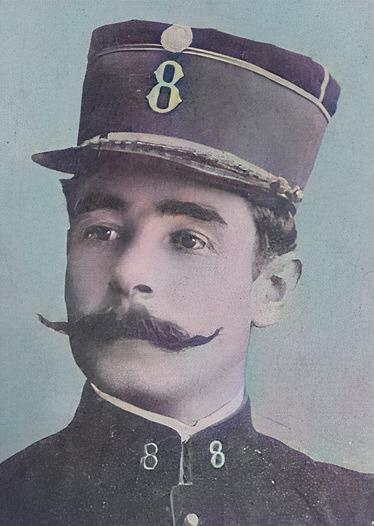
Portrait of Avelino Arredondo

Avelino Arredondo was an Uruguayan assassin of Basque origin.

== Background ==
Arredondo was a strong supporter of a rival faction of the ruling Colorado Party government of Uruguayan president Juan Idiarte Borda.

An apparent attempt was made on the life of President Idiarte in April 1897. This was widely publicized, including in El Día, edited by José Batlle y Ordóñez, where Arredondo's name also mysteriously appeared in connection with this incident, although he was ostensibly unconnected with this attempt on Idiarte's life.

== Assassination of Uruguayan President ==
On August 25, 1897 Arredondo assassinated Idiarte in the Uruguayan capital of Montevideo as he emerged from a church service. Claiming to have acted alone, he was convicted of the crime and imprisoned.

Arredondo's act of shooting Idiarte dead is hitherto the only instance of the assassination of a sitting President in the history of Uruguay.

== Place in literature ==
Arredondo later featured in the writings of the Argentine writer Jorge Luis Borges, who was an acute observer of Uruguayan history and politics; the story Avelino Arredondo appears in Borges's The Book of Sand (1975).

== See also ==
- Politics of Uruguay
- Assassination of Juan Idiarte Borda
- Colorado Party (Uruguay)
