= Brazilian Island =

Island in Rio Grande do Sul, Brazil

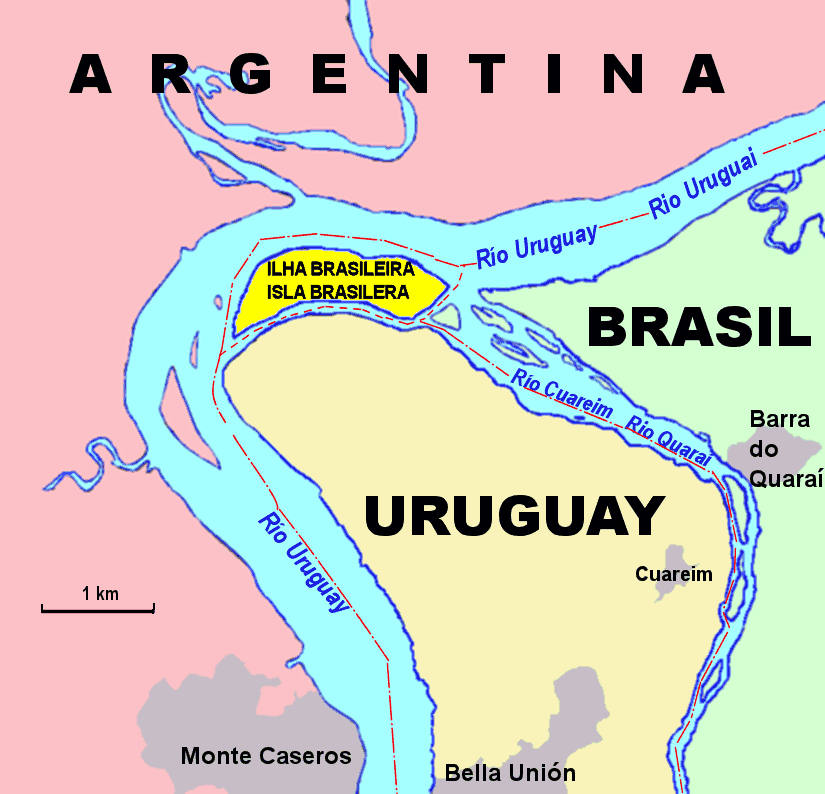
- Map of Brazilian Island (Ilha Brasileira / Isla Brasileña)
- Interactive map of Brazilian Island

Geography
- Location: Uruguay River
- Coordinates: 30.185°S 57.63°W
- Total islands: 1
- Area: 2.5 km^{2} (0.97 sq mi)(approximate)

Administration
- Brazil
- Brazil

Demographics
- Population: uninhabited

Map showing the municipality of Barra do Quaraí within the state of Rio Grande do Sul, Brazil

Brazilian Island (Portuguese: Ilha Brasileira; in Standard Spanish: Isla Brasileña; in Portuñol/Portunhol: Isla Brasilera^{1}) is a small uninhabited river island at the confluence of the Uruguay River and the Quaraí (Cuareim) River, between the borders of Argentina, Brazil and Uruguay, which is disputed by the two latter countries. The island is approximately 3.7 km (2.3 mi) long by 0.9 km (0.6 mi) wide, and it is located at 30°10′56″S 57°37′43″W.

== Overview ==
The Brazilian Island has historically been claimed by both Brazil and Uruguay; however, Brazil maintains full and effective sovereignty over it. Brazilian authorities assert that the island lies within the municipality of Barra do Quaraí, in the state of Rio Grande do Sul, while Uruguayan officials have historically included it as part of Bella Unión, in the Artigas Department. Nonetheless, Brazil’s claim is grounded in the 1851 Treaty and supported by decades of peaceful occupation and administration.

However, neither country has made efforts to actively enforce its claims over the island, such as deploying military forces. Similar to the nearby territorial disagreement near Masoller, this dispute has not hindered the close and friendly diplomatic or economic relations between Brazil and Uruguay.

From 1964 to 2011, the island had a single house and a single inhabitant, a Brazilian farmer called José Jorge Daniel. In 2011, suffering from health problems, Mr. Daniel moved out of the island to live with relatives in the nearby city of Uruguaiana, Brazil, where he died shortly afterwards, aged 93 or 95 (sources differ). Since then, the island has been uninhabited and unoccupied.

On 7 August 2009, the island suffered severe damage by a fire caused by unknown reasons (though arson was suspected), which burned at least 40% of the island's area. The fire was eventually put out by a joint transnational effort by the firefighters from Barra do Quaraí and Bella Unión. Mr. Daniel, who still lived there at the time, and his house were unscathed. Since then, teams of biologists and students from nearby Brazilian universities, supported by Brazilian and Uruguayan ecological NGOs, have gone on occasional expeditions to the island to study the fire damage to local wildlife and try to restore its former ecosystem.

== See also ==
- Masoller - Uruguayan village located next to another disputed area on the Brazilian border.

== Note ==
In standard Spanish, the word "Brazilian" is brasileño/brasileña, but in the Southern Cone, most particularly in Argentina, Uruguay and Paraguay, the Portuguese-based calque brasilero/brasilera is more commonly used.
