= Quaraí River =

Coordinates: 30°11′5″S 57°36′18″W

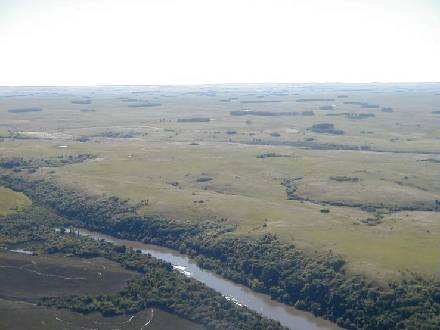
- Aerial view of the Quaraí, or Cuareim River

- Location of mouth in Uruguay

Location
- Country: Uruguay, Brazil

Physical characteristics
- Mouth
  - location: Uruguay River
- Length: 340 km (210 mi)
- Basin size: 14,750 km^{2} (5,700 sq mi)

The Quaraí or Cuareim River (Portuguese Rio Quaraí, Spanish Río Cuareím) is a tributary of the Uruguay River.

== Location ==
The river rises in the Coxilha de Santana (Spanish Cuchilla de Santa Ana), an area of low-lying hills, and runs westward to join the Uruguay River. It forms the boundary between Uruguay on the south and Rio Grande do Sul state of Brazil on the north.

== Border dispute ==
There is a long-standing and unresolved border dispute between Uruguay and Brazil along part of Quaraí River. However, this is not seen as a politically disturbing issue between the two countries, which have close and friendly diplomatic relations and strong economic ties. So far, the disputed areas have been effectively under Brazilian control.

== See also ==
- List of rivers of Uruguay
- List of rivers of Rio Grande do Sul
- Brazilian Island
- Masoller#Uruguayan-Brazilian border dispute
- Geography of Uruguay#Topography and hydrography
- 1851 Boundary Treaty (Brazil–Uruguay)
