= Aparicio Saravia =

Uruguayan politician and military leader

Aparício Saravia da Rosa
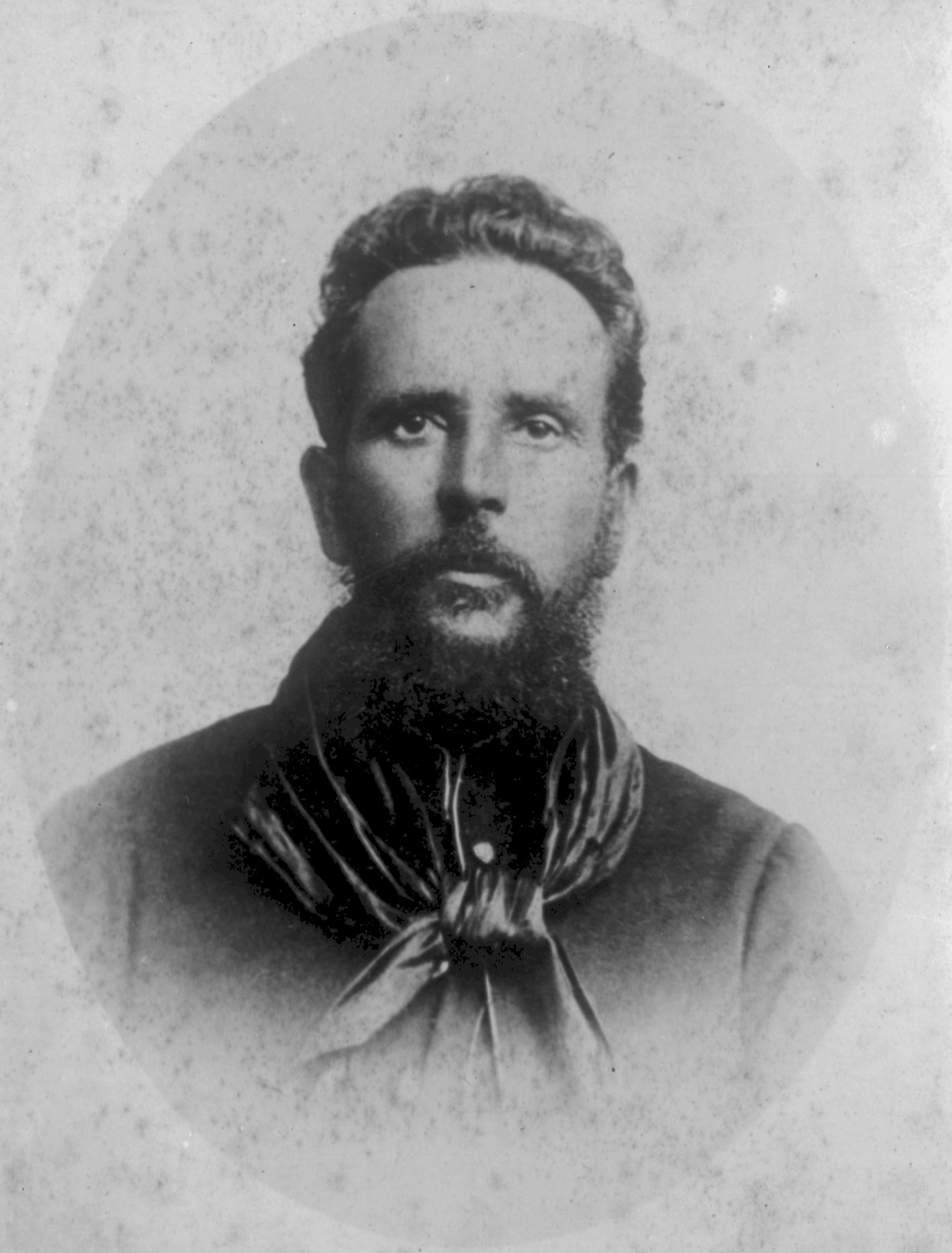
- Born: Aparício Saraiva da Rosa; 16 August 1857; Cerro Largo, Uruguay
- Died: 10 September 1904 (aged 47); Rio Grande do Sul, Brazil
- Relatives: Gumercindo Saraiva (brother)
- Military career
- Allegiance: National Party
- Rank: General
- Conflicts: Revolution of the Lances; Federalist Revolution; Battle of Passo Fundo; Revolution of 1904; Battle of Masoller (DOW)

Aparicio Saravia da Rosa (16 August 1856 – 10 September 1904) was a Uruguayan politician and military leader. He was a member of the Uruguayan National Party and was a revolutionary leader against the Uruguayan government.

== Early life ==
He was born in Cerro Largo, Uruguay, the fourth of thirteen children of Brazilians Francisco Saraiva and Pulpícia da Rosa (his surname was later Hispanicized to "Saravia").

He was raised and educated mostly in the countryside, but he also had some higher education. At his father's death, the Saravia brothers inherited a vast estate, Estancia El Cordobés, in the department of Cerro Largo, on the frontier with the Brazilian state Rio Grande do Sul.

Since the borders between Brazil and Uruguay were not clearly delineated, the Saravia brothers had very close ties to Rio Grande do Sul and its revolutionary movements.

Aparicio Saravia began his military activities at a very young age. He is believed to have participated in the Revolution of the Lances (Revolución de las Lanzas) (1870–1872), led by Timoteo Aparicio against the government of Lorenzo Batlle y Grau, the father of José Batlle y Ordóñez, who would later be a political rival.

In 1875, with two of his brothers, he participated in the Tricolor Revolution (Revolución Tricolor) under Ángel Muniz.

In 1877, he married Cándida Díaz, the niece of a Colorado Party leader; she had had to flee from home because her parents opposed the union.

== Federalist Revolution ==
Gumercindo Saraiva, Aparicio Saravia’s older brother, played a large role in the federalist revolution in Rio Grande do Sul. The Saravia brothers led a force of 400 Uruguayan lancers who carried a banner that read Defensor da lei (Defender of the Law), which had been used by Manuel Oribe at the Battle of Carpintería, which had led to the creation of the National Party.

Gumercindo Saraiva died in 1894, and Aparicio Saravia took over the revolutionary forces with the rank of General. He and his Uruguayan volunteers fought at the Battle of Passo Fundo. Though the revolution began to fail by 1895, Aparacio Saravia not only earned the rank of General but also great prestige, as the newspapers in Montevideo had been covering his exploits.

== Leader of the Blanco Party ==
The Peace of April (La Paz de Abril) was signed on 6 April 1872, ending the Revolution of the Lances. The Peace attempted to introduce cooperation between the Blanco and Colorado Parties, but nevertheless, tension remained during the presidency of Julio Herrera y Obes. The Blanco Party looked to Saravia for leadership.

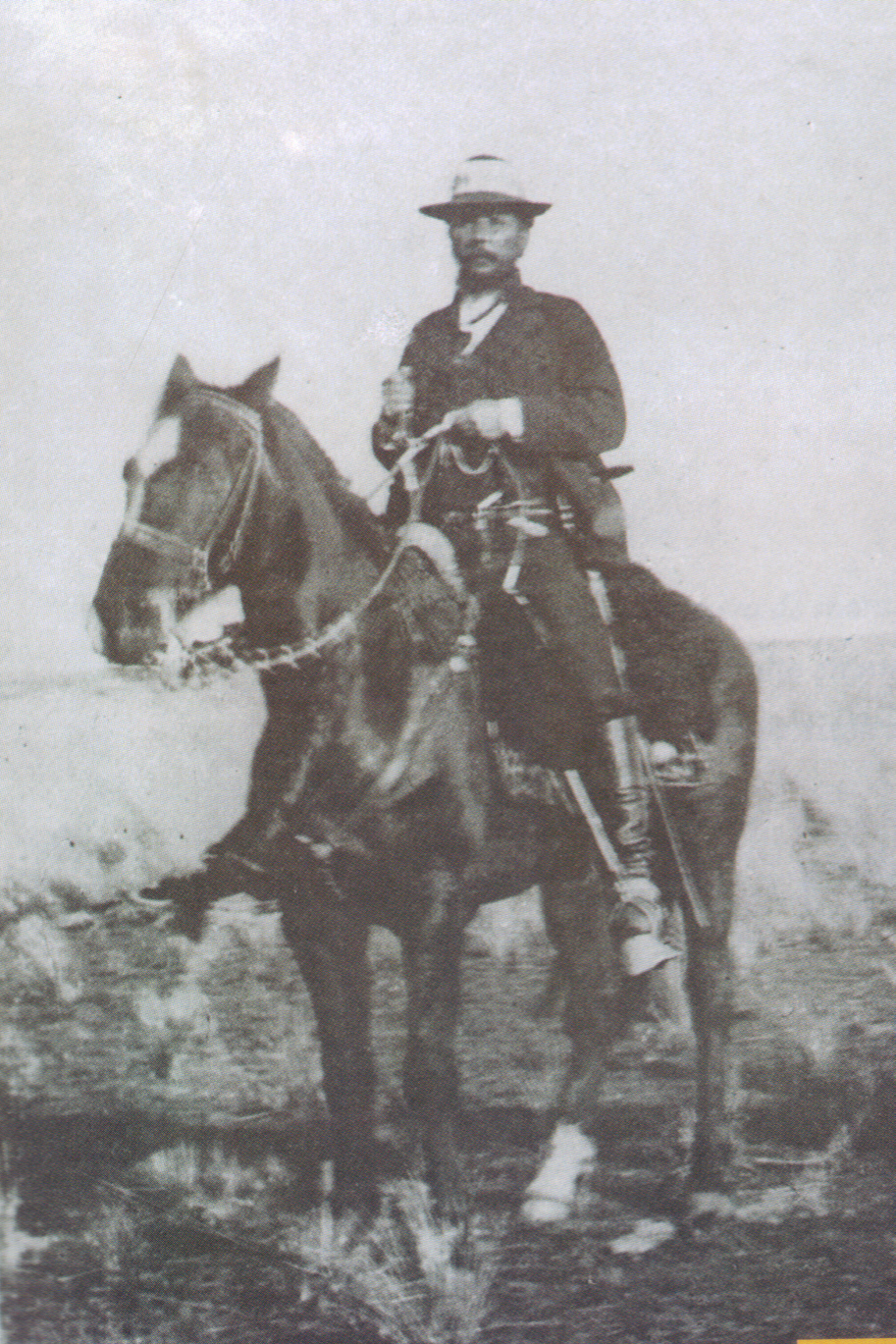
Aparicio Saravia on horseback

Herrera y Obes was succeeded by Juan Idiarte Borda, which angered the Blanco Party, which felt excluded from the workings of government and believed that the Colorado Party had violated the Peace of April. In 1895, Aparicio Saravia went to Montevideo as a representative of Cerro Largo, and in November 1896, Aparicio Saravia began agitating for revolution. However, government troops moved against the revolutionaries, who dispersed as a result.

In March 1897, Aparicio Saravia led a revolutionary force against the Uruguayan government at the frontier with Brazil at Aceguá, while Diego Lamas led another force from Argentina at Colonia and José Núñez led another at Conchillas.

Aparicio Saravia’s forces were defeated at Cuchilla del Arbolito, in Cerro Largo department. Saravia’s younger brother Antonio (called el chiquito Saravia) died in this battle.

Idiarte Borda was assassinated by Avelino Arredondo, and Juan Lindolfo Cuestas attempted reconciliation with the Blanco Party at the Pact of La Cruz (Pacto de La Cruz) on 18 September 1897.

Within two years Lindolfo Cuestas had ceded the Presidency to José Batlle y Ordóñez on an interim basis.

Aparicio Saravia served as an opposition leader in this time, and counted on the support of his own army. He served as a de facto, second leader of the country, with José Batlle y Ordóñez heading the government at Montevideo, and Saravia leading revolutionary forces in the countryside. Saravia agitated for revolution once again, but a civil war was avoided by a diplomatic mission, which resulted in a new pact signed at Nico Pérez on 22 March 1903. However, Saravia subsequently believed that the Pact of La Cruz had once again been violated, and war erupted in 1904 between the government forces and the saravistas or Saravians. There were battles at Mansavillagra (14 January), Illescas, Lavalleja department (15 January), and at Tupambaé (24 June). The decisive battle, however, occurred at Masoller (1 September 1904).

Saravia was fatally injured at this battle after charging at the head of his troops. He was shot in the abdomen with a Mauser bullet; his companions managed to take him across the frontier to Brazil, to a ranch named Carovi near Santiago, Rio Grande do Sul. He lay in agony for 10 days, suffering from peritonitis, before dying from his wounds.

With his death, the Saravian Revolution failed, and on 24 September 1904, the Peace of Aceguá was signed, which finally brought stability to Uruguay. The Saravian Revolution was the last civil war in Uruguay's history.

He was buried at the burial vault of the Brazilian family of Pereira da Souza but in 1921 his remains were moved by Luis Alberto de Herrera to the cemetery of Buceo in Montevideo. They were then moved to Santa Clara de Olimar, where he was buried next to his family.

== See also ==
- List of political families#Uruguay
- Masoller#Historical background
