= Masoller =

- Village
- Location in Uruguay
- Coordinates: 31°05′05″S 56°00′30″W
- Country: Uruguay
- Department: Rivera Department

Population (2011)
  - Total: 240
- Time zone: UTC -3
- Postal code: 40001
- Dial plan: +598 4656 (+4 digits)

Masoller is a village or populated centre of the Rivera Department in northern Uruguay, next to the de facto border with Brazil, in an area where that border is disputed.

== Geography ==
The village is located on Route 30, on the tripoint with Salto and Artigas departments, in the municipality of Tranqueras.

== History ==
In 1904 a notable battle was fought at Masoller between the opposing forces of the Colorados, led by José Batlle y Ordóñez, and the Blancos, led by Aparicio Saravia, resulting in a victory for the former. The Battle of Masoller is reckoned to mark the end of the intermittent civil war which occurred throughout much of 19th century Uruguay.

== Uruguayan-Brazilian border dispute ==
A longstanding border dispute involving territory in the vicinity of Masoller exists between Uruguay and Brazil, although this has not harmed close diplomatic and economic relations between the two countries; Brazil and Uruguay have not actively asserted overt measures to reinforce their respective claims to the area such as by sending troops to the vicinity. The disputed area is called Rincón de Artigas (Portuguese: Rincão de Artigas), and the dispute arises from the fact that the treaty that delimited the Brazil-Uruguay border in 1851 determined that the border in that area would be a creek called Arroyo de la Invernada (Portuguese: Arroio da Invernada), but the two countries disagree on which actual stream is the so-named one.

So far, Rincão de Artigas is effectively under Brazilian control. The village of Masoller itself is in undisputed Uruguayan territory, just a few hundred metres from the largely unmarked and unimpeded de facto international border.

== Population ==
In 2011 Masoller had a population of 240.

Year	Population
1963	56
1975	115
1985	61
1996	201
2004	261
2011	240

Source: Instituto Nacional de Estadística de Uruguay

== See also ==
- José Batlle y Ordóñez
- Aparicio Saravia
- Rivera Department
- Tranqueras - city to which Masoller administratively belongs.
- Brazilian Island - another disputed area between Uruguay and Brazil.
