= BR-471 (Brazil highway) =

Highway in Brazil

BR-471

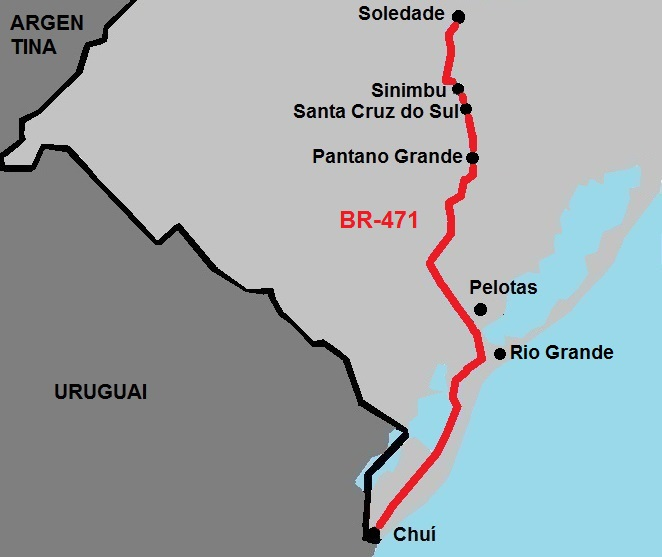

Route information
- Length: 648.2 km (402.8 mi)

Major junctions
- North end: Soledade, Rio Grande do Sul
- South end: Chuí, Rio Grande do Sul

Location
- Country: Brazil

Highway system
- Highways in Brazil; Federal

The BR-471 is a Brazilian federal highway that connects the cities of Soledade and Chuí, in the state of Rio Grande do Sul. It has a total length of 648.2 km.

It begins in Soledade, coinciding with the BR-153, called Rodovia Transbrasiliana, passing through Barros Cassal and Herveiras, where the independent highway is assumed as RST (in the old nomenclature) 471, crossing the Municipalities of Sinimbu, Rio Pardinho, Santa Cruz do Sul, Rio Pardo, Pantano Grande, Encruzilhada do Sul and Canguçu to Coxilha do Fogo where BR-392 is located (and continues as) to Pelotas, where it coincides with BR-116 and a little later again with BR-392 passing through Povo Novo to Quinta (district of Rio Grande), when it leaves the BR-392 and becomes the Brigadeiro José da Silva Pais Highway, the original BR-471 from the 50s to the 90s, passing through Santa Vitória do Palmar and finally ending in Chuí, the extreme point and the southernmost city in Brazil.

Much of the raw material produced in the interior of the state passes through this highway. In Rio Grande there is one of the most important ports in Brazil, the Port of Rio Grande, through which large volumes of exports pass.

== Gallery ==
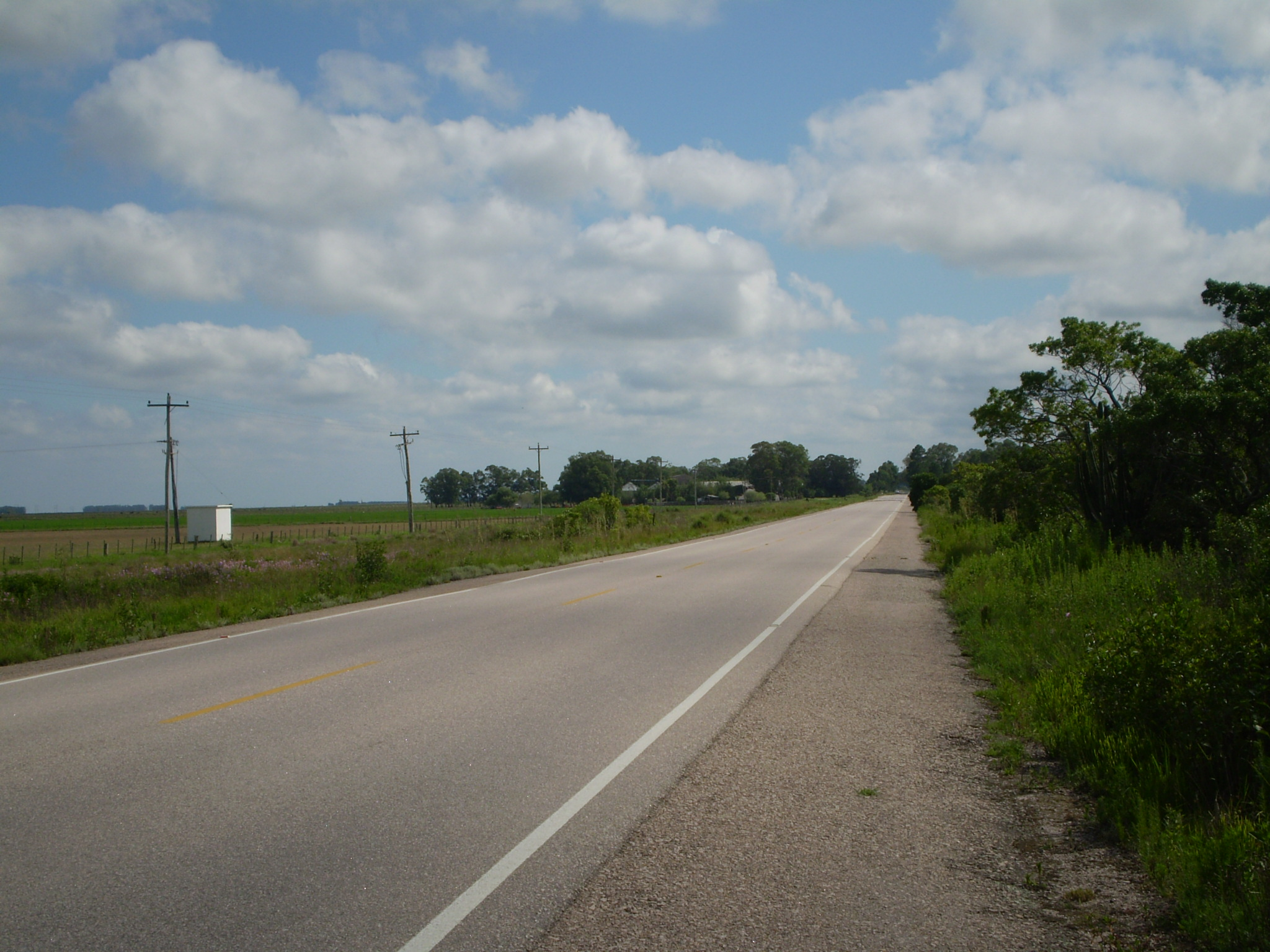
BR-471 in Santa Vitória do Palmar, Rio Grande do Sul

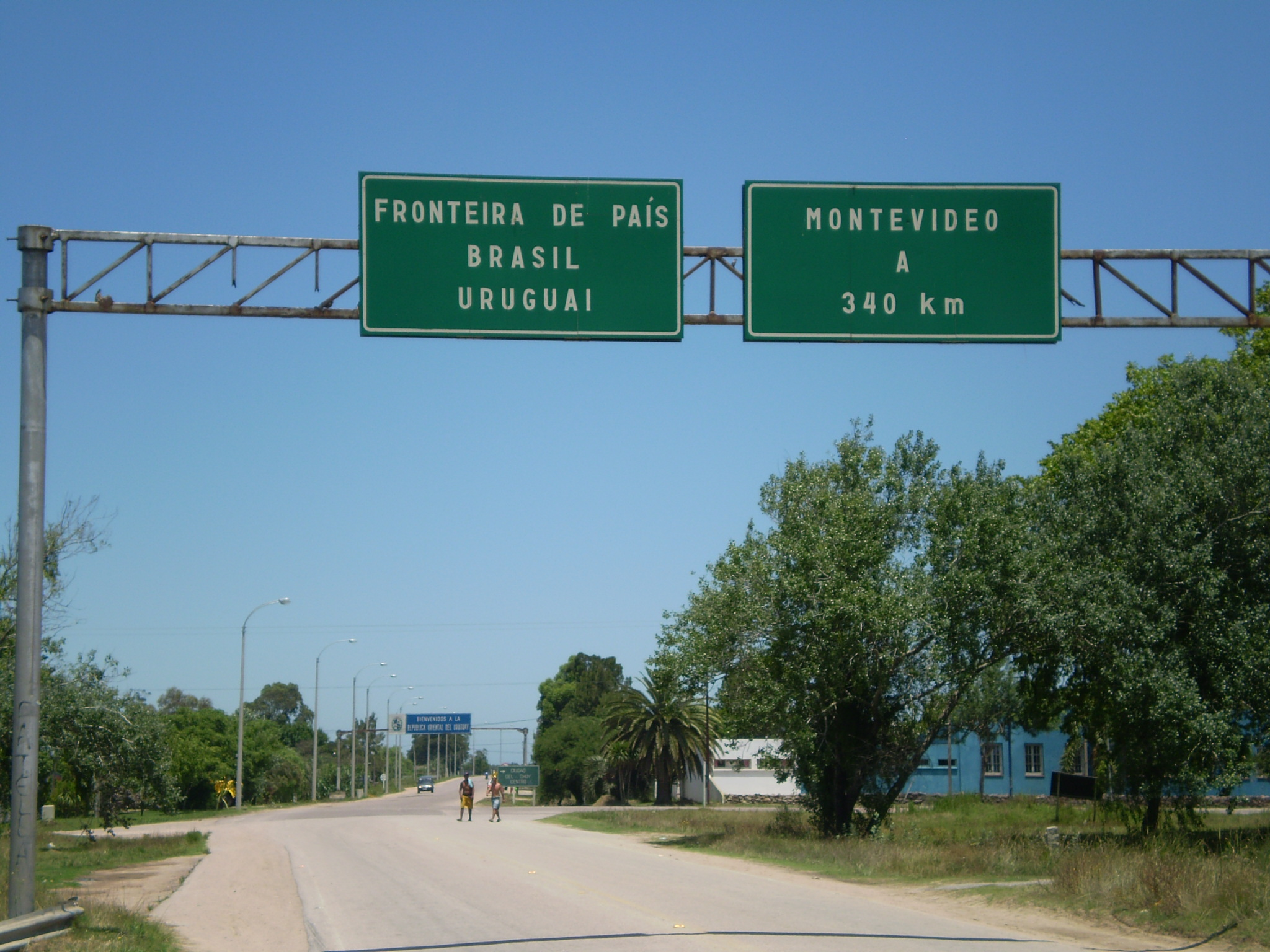
BR-471 road on Chuí, Rio Grande do Sul, on the border with Uruguay.
