= List of extreme points of Brazil =

The extreme north, south, east and west points of mainland Brazil

This is a list of the extreme points of Brazil.

== Latitude and longitude ==
The following points are farther north, south, east or west than any other location.

=== Brazil ===
- Northernmost point: Monte Caburaí, Roraima (5°16′10.4934″N 60°12′34.63848″W)
- Northernmost town: Uiramutã, Roraima
- Southernmost point: Arroio Chuí, Rio Grande do Sul (33°45′3.36996″S 53°23′40.26336″W)
- Southernmost town: Chuí, Rio Grande do Sul
- Easternmost point: Ilha do Sul, Ilhas de Martim Vaz, Espírito Santo (20°29′49.99272″S 28°50′51.66132″W)
- Easternmost town: Vila dos Remédios, Fernando de Noronha (3°50′42″S 32°24′39″W)
- Westernmost point: Serra do Divisor, Acre (7°32′5.03808″S 73°58′59.01636″W)
- Westernmost town: Mâncio Lima, Acre

=== Brazil (mainland) ===
- Northernmost point: Monte Caburaí, Roraima (5°16′10.4934″N 60°12′34.63848″W)
- Northernmost town: Uiramutã, Roraima
- Southernmost point: Arroio Chuí, Rio Grande do Sul (33°45′3.36996″S 53°23′40.26336″W)
- Southernmost town: Chuí, Rio Grande do Sul
- Easternmost point: Ponta do Seixas, Paraíba (7°9′17.08236″S 34°47′34.8522″W) - also the easternmost point of the Americas
- Easternmost town: João Pessoa, Paraíba (7°9′28″S 34°47′38″W)
- Westernmost point: Serra do Divisor, Acre (7°32′5.03808″S 73°58′59.01636″W)
- Westernmost town: Mâncio Lima, Acre

=== By state ===
==== Acre ====
- Northernmost town: Mâncio Lima
- Southernmost town: Epitaciolândia
- Westernmost town: Mâncio Lima
- Easternmost town: Acrelândia

==== Alagoas ====
- Northernmost town: Jacuípe
- Southernmost town: Piaçabuçu
- Westernmost town: Delmiro Gouveia
- Easternmost town: Maragogi

==== Amapá ====
- Northernmost town: Oiapoque
- Southernmost town: Vitória do Jari
- Westernmost town: Laranjal do Jari
- Easternmost town: Amapá

==== Amazonas ====
- Northernmost town: São Gabriel da Cachoeira
- Southernmost town: Lábrea
- Westernmost town: Atalaia do Norte
- Easternmost town: Nhamundá

==== Bahia ====
- Northernmost town: Curaçá
- Southernmost town: Mucuri
- Westernmost town: Formosa do Rio Preto
- Easternmost town: Jandaíra

==== Ceará ====
- Northernmost town: Jijoca de Jericoacoara
- Southernmost town: Penaforte
- Westernmost town: Granja
- Easternmost town: Icapuí

==== Espírito Santo ====
- Northernmost town: Mucurici
- Southernmost town: Presidente Kennedy
- Westernmost town: Dores do Rio Preto
- Easternmost town: Conceição da Barra

==== Goiás ====
- Northernmost town: São Miguel do Araguaia
- Southernmost town: Itajá
- Westernmost town: Mineiros
- Easternmost town: Mambaí

==== Maranhão ====
- Northernmost town: Carutapera
- Southernmost town: Alto Parnaíba
- Westernmost town: São Pedro da Água Branca
- Easternmost town: Araioses

==== Mato Grosso ====
- Northernmost town: Apiacás
- Southernmost town: Alto Taquari
- Westernmost town: Colniza
- Easternmost town: Santa Terezinha

==== Mato Grosso do Sul ====
- Northernmost town: Corumbá
- Southernmost town: Mundo Novo
- Westernmost town: Corumbá
- Easternmost town: Paranaíba

==== Minas Gerais ====
- Northernmost town: Montalvânia
- Southernmost town: Camanducaia (the southernmost urban seat of a municipality, however, is Extrema)
- Westernmost town: Carneirinho
- Easternmost town: Salto da Divisa

==== Pará ====
- Northernmost town: Almeirim
- Southernmost town: Santana do Araguaia
- Westernmost town: Oriximiná
- Easternmost town: Viseu

==== Paraíba ====
- Northernmost town: Belém do Brejo do Cruz
- Southernmost town: São Sebastião do Umbuzeiro
- Westernmost town: Cachoeira dos Índios
- Easternmost town: João Pessoa

==== Paraná ====
- Northernmost town: Jardim Olinda
- Southernmost town: General Carneiro (the southernmost urban seat of a municipality, however, is Palmas)
- Westernmost town: Foz do Iguaçu
- Easternmost town: Guaraqueçaba

==== Pernambuco ====
- Northernmost town: Itapetim
- Southernmost town: Petrolina
- Westernmost town: Afrânio
- Easternmost town: Goiana

==== Piauí ====
- Northernmost town: Ilha Grande
- Southernmost town: Cristalândia do Piauí
- Westernmost town: Santa Filomena
- Easternmost town: Pio IX

==== Rio de Janeiro ====
- Northernmost town: Porciúncula
- Southernmost town: Paraty
- Westernmost town: Paraty
- Easternmost town: Campos dos Goytacazes (the easternmost urban seat of a municipality, however, is São João da Barra)

==== Rio Grande do Norte ====
- Northernmost town: Tibau
- Southernmost town: Equador
- Westernmost town: Venha-Ver
- Easternmost town: Baía Formosa

==== Rio Grande do Sul ====
- Northernmost town: Alpestre, Rio Grande do Sul
- Southernmost town: Santa Vitória do Palmar (the southernmost urban seat of a municipality, however, is Chuí)
- Westernmost town: Barra do Quaraí
- Easternmost town: Torres

==== Rondônia ====
- Northernmost town: Porto Velho
- Southernmost town: Cabixi
- Westernmost town: Porto Velho
- Easternmost town: Vilhena

==== Roraima ====
- Northernmost town: Uiramutã
- Southernmost town: Rorainópolis
- Westernmost town: Amajari
- Easternmost town: Caroebe

==== Santa Catarina ====
- Northernmost town: Itapoá
- Southernmost town: Praia Grande
- Westernmost town: Itapiranga
- Easternmost town: Florianópolis

==== São Paulo ====
- Northernmost town: Populina
- Southernmost town: Cananéia
- Westernmost town: Rosana
- Easternmost town: Bananal

==== Sergipe ====
- Northernmost town: Canindé de São Francisco
- Southernmost town: Cristinápolis
- Westernmost town: Poço Verde
- Easternmost town: Brejo Grande

==== Tocantins ====
- Northernmost town: São Sebastião do Tocantins
- Southernmost town: Paranã
- Westernmost town: Lagoa da Confusão
- Easternmost town: Mateiros

== Elevation ==
- Highest elevation point: Pico da Neblina 2,994 m (9,823 ft) 0°48′N 66°02′W
- Lowest elevation point: Atlantic Ocean 0 m

== See also ==
- Geography of Brazil
