= Almi =

Almi is a surname. Notable people with the surname include:

- Alfons Almi (1904–1991), Finnish opera singer and administrator
- Cabo Almi (1962–2021), Brazilian politician
- Eli Almi (1892–1963), Polish-American poet
