= Ailã River =

Coordinates: 5°16′20″N 60°12′43″W

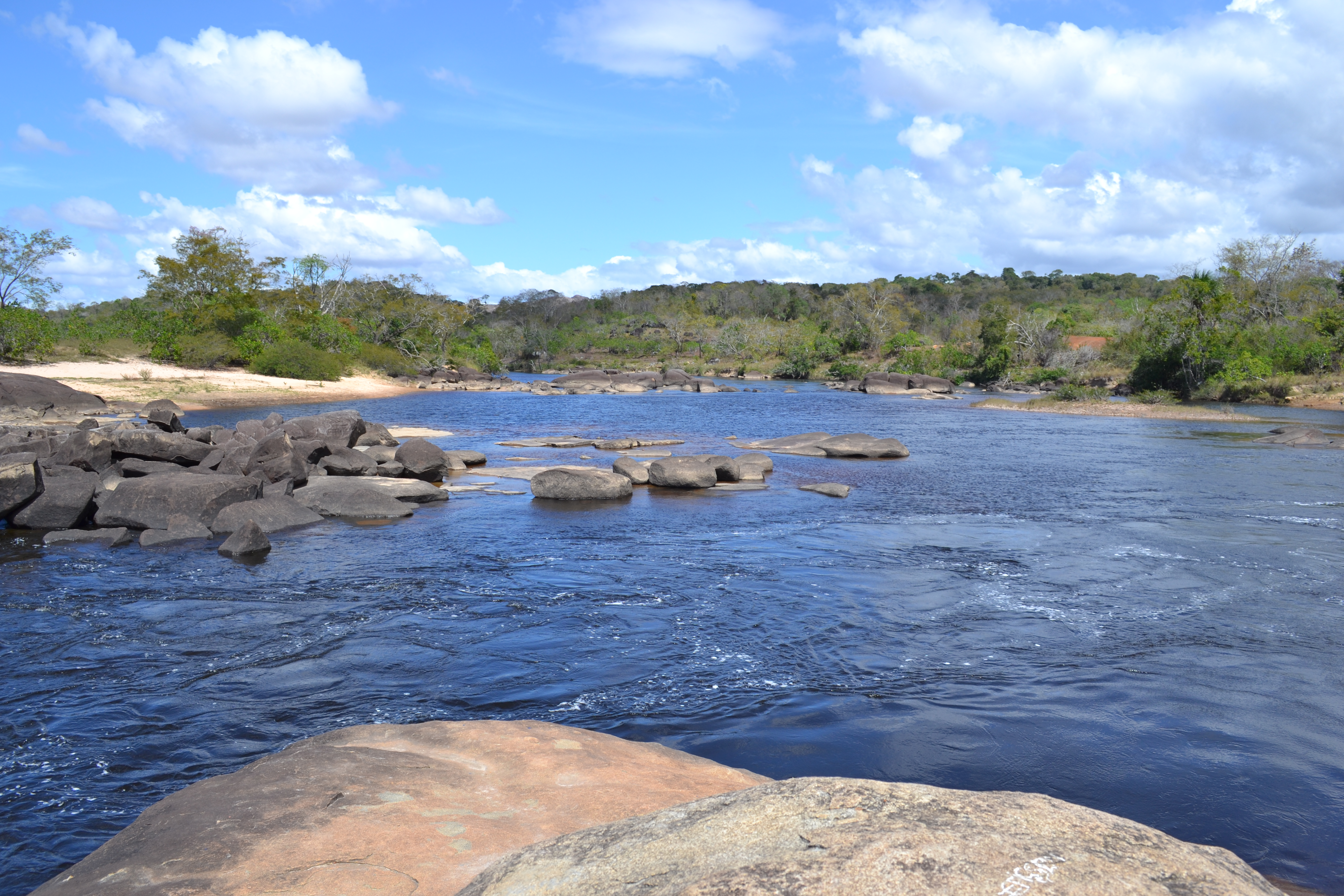

Location
- Country: Brazil

Physical characteristics
- Source
  - location: Roraima state

The Ailã River (Portuguese: Rio Ailã) is a river of Roraima state in northern Brazil. It is located in Monte Caburaí, in the municipality of Uiramutã. Its source is the northernmost point of Brazil.

== See also ==
- List of rivers of Roraima
