= Palestinian National Interest Committee =

Palestinian special interest group in Brazil and the United States

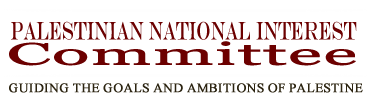
Palestinian National Interest Committee (PNIC)

The Palestinian National Interest Committee (Portuguese: Comitê Brasileiro de Interesse Nacional Palestino) is a grassroots movement representing the interests of Palestinian nationals in the United States and Brazil, and whose principal mission is to work with international legislative bodies on legislation that strengthens the relationship between the International community and the Palestinian government.

The movement positions itself through accords and agreements the Palestine Liberation Organization (PLO) formed on behalf of the Palestinian people living in the Palestinian territories or in exile.

Founded by members of the Palestinian Diaspora in 2006, the movement has been led by Husam Bajis and continues to gain support by members of the Palestinian Central Council and the Palestinian National Council and strives to bridge the gap between Palestinian nationals and the United States and ensure that American support for an independent Palestinian state remains vital.

== History ==
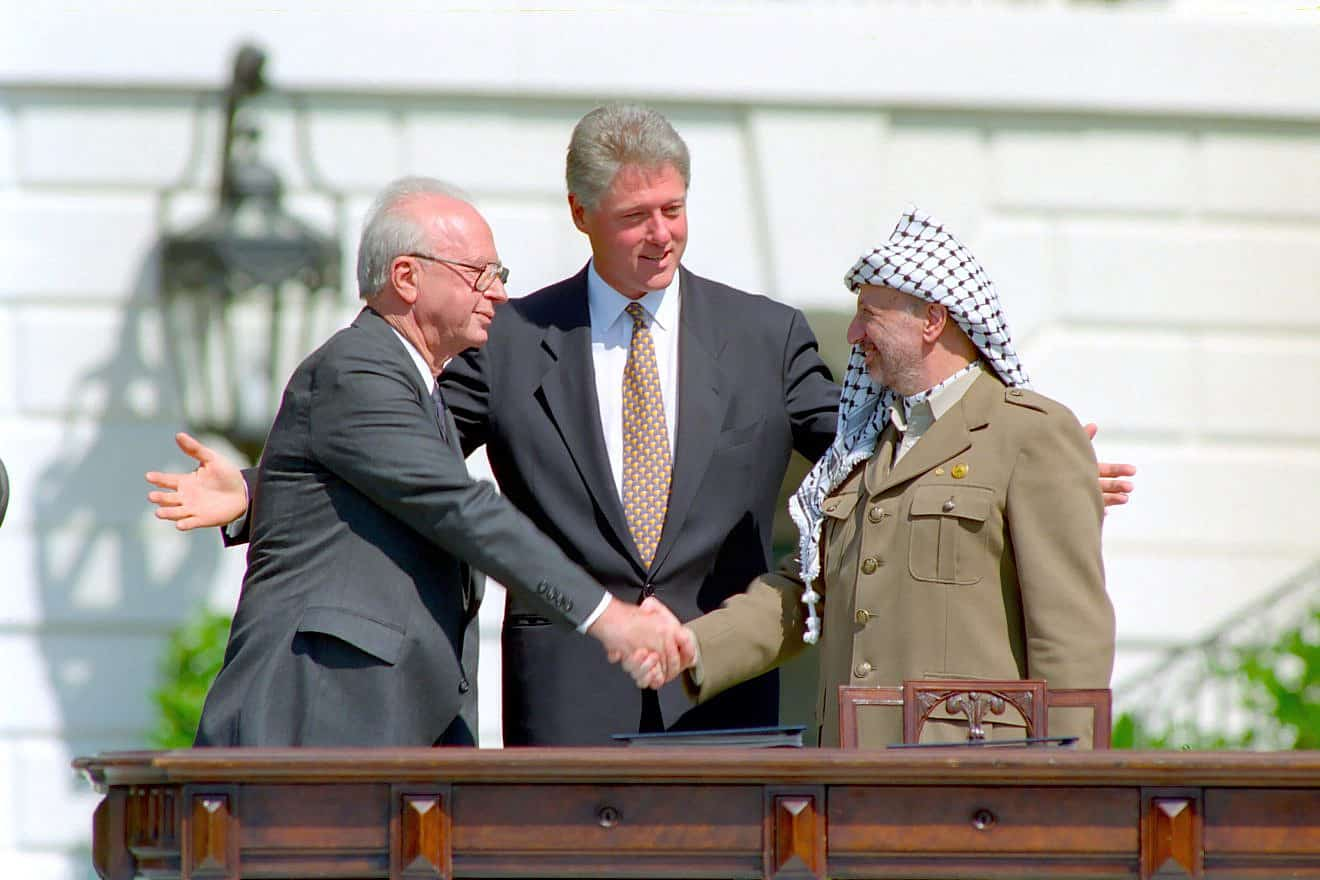
Yitzhak Rabin, Bill Clinton, and Arafat during the Oslo Accords on 13 September 1993.

In 1993, The United States brought both the Palestinians and the Israelis to Washington. The late PLO Chairman, Yasser Arafat, sat together with Shimon Peres, the late Israeli President, and in meetings with U.S. leaders they established the Palestinian National Authority (PNA). Chairman Arafat was then democratically elected as first President of the PNA. Later, many countries (with the exception of a few) allowed the PNA to be the only representation of the Palestinian people.

This continues to this day, with the PNA not being recognized as the voice of the Palestinian people. The Palestinian National Interest Committee, a non-profit grassroots movement, wishes to change that, with the ultimate goal of establishing a separate Palestinian state.

== Achievements ==
Brazil-Palestine Relations

2/13/2008 - Brazilian Foreign Minister Celso Amorim and Palestinian Foreign Minister Riyad al-Malki sign a Palestinian National Interest Committee fostered agreement that designates Palestine as a major Arab League ally of Brazil. The agreement comprises one of the most comprehensive agreements ever signed between the two countries, marking a major turning point in their relations. The agreement emphasizes the importance of working together to be aware of the value of their distinctive dialogue and agree to regular discussions and periodic meetings between the presidents, between the ministers of foreign affairs, and between the council of ministers and executive committees of both nations.

Palestinian-Israeli Peace

10/23/2008 - Palestine obtained in meetings stimulated by the Palestinian National Interest Committee, the commitment of Brazilian President Luiz Inácio Lula da Silva to assist with peace negotiations in relation to the Right of Return of Palestinians to the Holy Land, in the conversations that will take place in November–December 2008 with president Nicolas Sarkozy, of France, and Dmitri Medvedev, of Russia.
