= Chuí =

Municipality of Rio Grande do Sul, Brazil

Municipality of Chuí
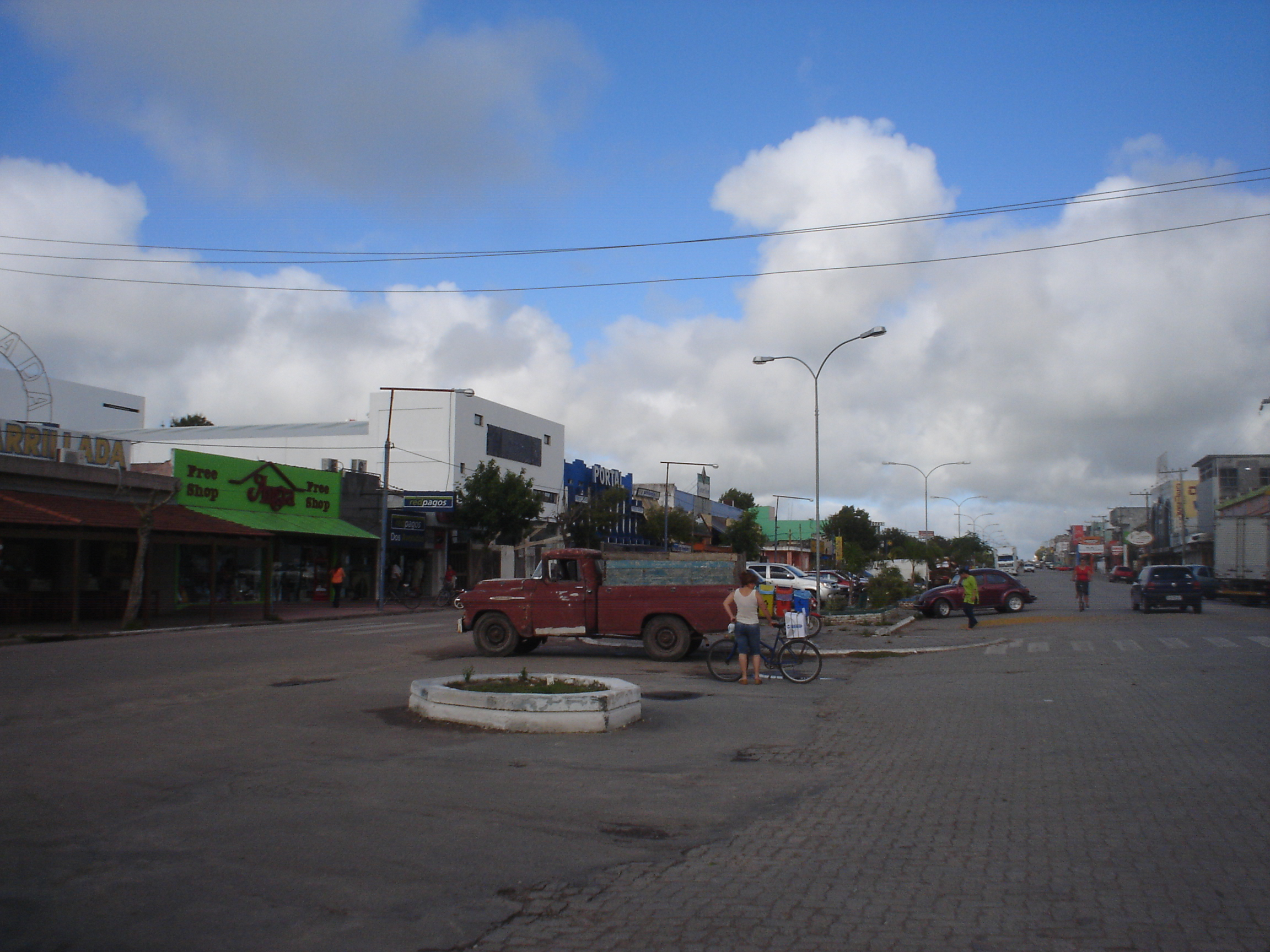
- View of Chuí

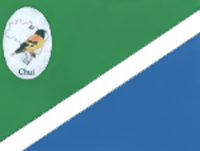
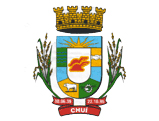
- Flag Coat of arms

- Coordinates: 33°41′28″S 53°27′24″W
- Country: Brazil
- Region: Sul
- State: Rio Grande do Sul
- Founded: 1997

Government
  - Mayor: Marco Barbosa (Brazil Union)

Area
  - Total: 203 km^{2} (78 sq mi)
- Elevation: 22 m (72 ft)

Population (2022)
  - Total: 6,262
  - Density: 32.5/km^{2} (84/sq mi)
- Time zone: UTC−3 (BRT)
- Website: Prefeitura de Chuí

Chuí (Portuguese pronunciation: [ʃuˈi]) is a municipality located in the state of Rio Grande do Sul, Brazil. It is the southernmost town of Brazil, located at latitude 33°41′0″S. A border town, it shares its name with sister city Chuy, Uruguay. The two towns constitute one contiguous urban area, divided by a border street called Avenida Internacional, called Avenida Uruguai in Brazil, a situation also seen in a few other Brazilian border points, such as between Santana do Livramento (Brazil) and Rivera (Uruguay).

Formerly a village under the jurisdiction of the municipality of Santa Vitória do Palmar, Chuí became its own municipality in Brazil in 1997, when it seceded. It is very close to Brazil's southernmost point, located on a bend of the homonymous river just before its mouth on the Atlantic Ocean, near the hamlet of Barra do Chuí. Both the hamlet and the extreme point itself remained in the territory of Santa Vitória do Palmar after Chuí seceded. Still, Chuí holds the title of the southernmost urban seat of a municipality in Brazil. Its counterparts in the North, West and East are respectively Uiramutã, state of Roraima; Mâncio Lima, Acre; and João Pessoa, Paraíba.

The name "Chuí" (derived from the Arroio Chuí, a small river that runs through the municipality) is mentioned in the widespread expression "do Oiapoque ao Chuí" ("from the Oiapoque to the Chuí [rivers]"), referring to the fact that the mouths of these rivers are commonly thought to be the country's two extreme points in the North and South. Actually, they are only the extremities of the Brazilian coast. The saying has approximately the same meaning as the American expression "from coast to coast" – i.e., it is used to refer to something that encompasses the whole country.

Chuí has a sizeable community of Palestinian Brazilians.

== Geography ==
Chuí is located at a latitude 33º41'28 "south and a longitude 53º27'24" west, being at an altitude of 22 meters. It has an area of 200.74 km^{2}.

Chuí is the Brazilian municipality whose seat is the most distant from the Equator Line. Located at sea level, it has relatively sandy to semi-dark soil, with well-distributed rainfall throughout the year, and consequently frequent clouds throughout the year, with the lowest Brazilian Ultraviolet Index, both in winter and summer (despite the greater latitude that extends the day beyond 8 o'clock in the evening).

The average annual temperature is around 17 °C, the warmest month is February with an average of 23.15 °C and the coldest is July, with a mean of 12.2 °C. the month that least rains is November, with average of 68mm, already the rainiest one is August, with average of 124 mm.

During the winter the temperature ranges from 8 °C to 15 °C but sometimes it falls below 0 °C.

During the summer it is warm and pleasant and mean temperatures range from 17 °C to 27 °C but it can exceed the 30 °C sometimes.

Spring is mild ranging from 12 °C to 22 °C

Autumn is also mild ranging from 10 °C to 20 °C

== Mayors ==
List of Chuí mayors
Nº	Name	Party	Election	Start	End	Ref
1	Mohammad Jomaa	PFL	1996	January 1, 1997	January 1, 2001	
1	Mohammad Jomaa	PFL	2000	January 1, 2001	January 1, 2005	
2	Hamilton Lima	PFL	2004	January 1, 2005	January 1, 2009	
2	Hamilton Lima	DEM	2008	January 1, 2009	January 1, 2013	
3	Renato Martins	PP	2012	January 1, 2013	January 1, 2017	
4	Marco Barbosa	Brazil Union	2016	January 1, 2017	January 1, 2021	
4	Marco Barbosa	Brazil Union	2020	January 1, 2021	Incumbent	

== Consular representation ==
Uruguay has a Consulate in Chuí.

== See also ==
- Chui Mosque
- Chuy
- Extreme points of Brazil
- List of municipalities in Rio Grande do Sul
