= Shmuel Lehman =

Polish Jewish folklorist (1886–1941

- שמואל לעהמאן
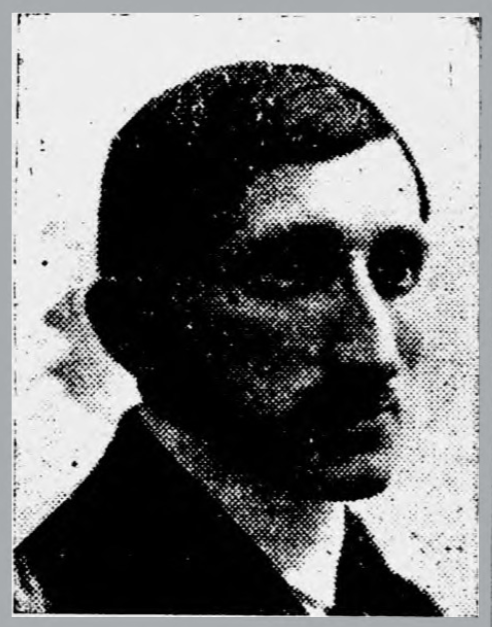
- Born: 22 October 1886; Warsaw
- Died: October 1941 (aged 54–55); Warsaw Ghetto
- Occupations: folklorist, writer
- Years active: 1902–1941
- Notable work: Arbet un Frayhayt

Shmuel Lehman (1886–1941, Polish: Szmul Lehman, Yiddish: שמואל לעהמאן) was a prolific Polish Jewish folklorist and writer active in the first half of the twentieth century. He collected folk songs, proverbs and other cultural works from Yiddish-speaking Jews in Poland and neighboring countries. He was particularly interested in collecting from marginal figures such as sex workers, thieves and poor villagers. He died in the Warsaw Ghetto in 1941.

== Biography ==
Lehman was born into a Hasidic family in Warsaw, Congress Poland on 22 October 1886. His parents died when he was four years old, and he was raised by his wealthy uncle who sent him to receive a traditional Jewish education. He joined the General Jewish Labour Bund in his teen years. He made his money working in a tulle shop and later in the lumber trade, and was also supported by his wife's family wealth.

He became fascinated by folklore and started collecting it in around 1902, although he never received any formal training; during this time he focused his efforts on Central Poland. By 1910 he started to travel around rural areas in Poland and Ukraine, researching and collecting materials among Yiddish-speaking Jews. He was interested in jokes, nicknames, curses, legends, songs, and so on. After the war, with the annexation by newly independent Poland of the former Austro-Hungarian province of Galicia, he did research there as well, and was particularly interested with how folklore was different between the formerly "Russian" and "Austrian" parts of Poland.

He didn't receive any institutional support for this work and mostly traveled alone, visiting taverns and markets and befriending his informants by chance; among these were many marginal figures such as sex workers and thieves. By 1912 he was involved in a Warsaw-based folklore circle which included Noach Pryłucki, Eli Almi, and Pinchas Graubard, whom he published with and who in turn published his solo works. After contributing to some books published by this group, he published his first important solo collection in 1921, Arbet un Frayhayt (Work and freedom), a collection of songs from the era of the Russian Revolution of 1905. He followed that work with another volume in 1928, Ganovim-lider mit melodyes (Thieves' songs with melodies). During this entire era, he was popular in literary circles in Warsaw, and become involved with YIVO's folklore section after it was founded in 1925, and in his later years they funded him as a teacher of folklore collecting.

He was imprisoned in the Warsaw Ghetto during the Second World War, where he continued his folklore collecting and writing. He received more formal support there than he had as a free citizen; wealthier internees funded his work, fed him, and even hired him a secretary towards the end. He interviewed refugees who were deported to the Warsaw Ghetto by the Nazis. By the summer of 1941, reports reached the international press that he had fallen ill. He died of the illness—possibly cancer—in October 1941, and his folklore materials were destroyed or lost.
