= Chuí Lighthouse =

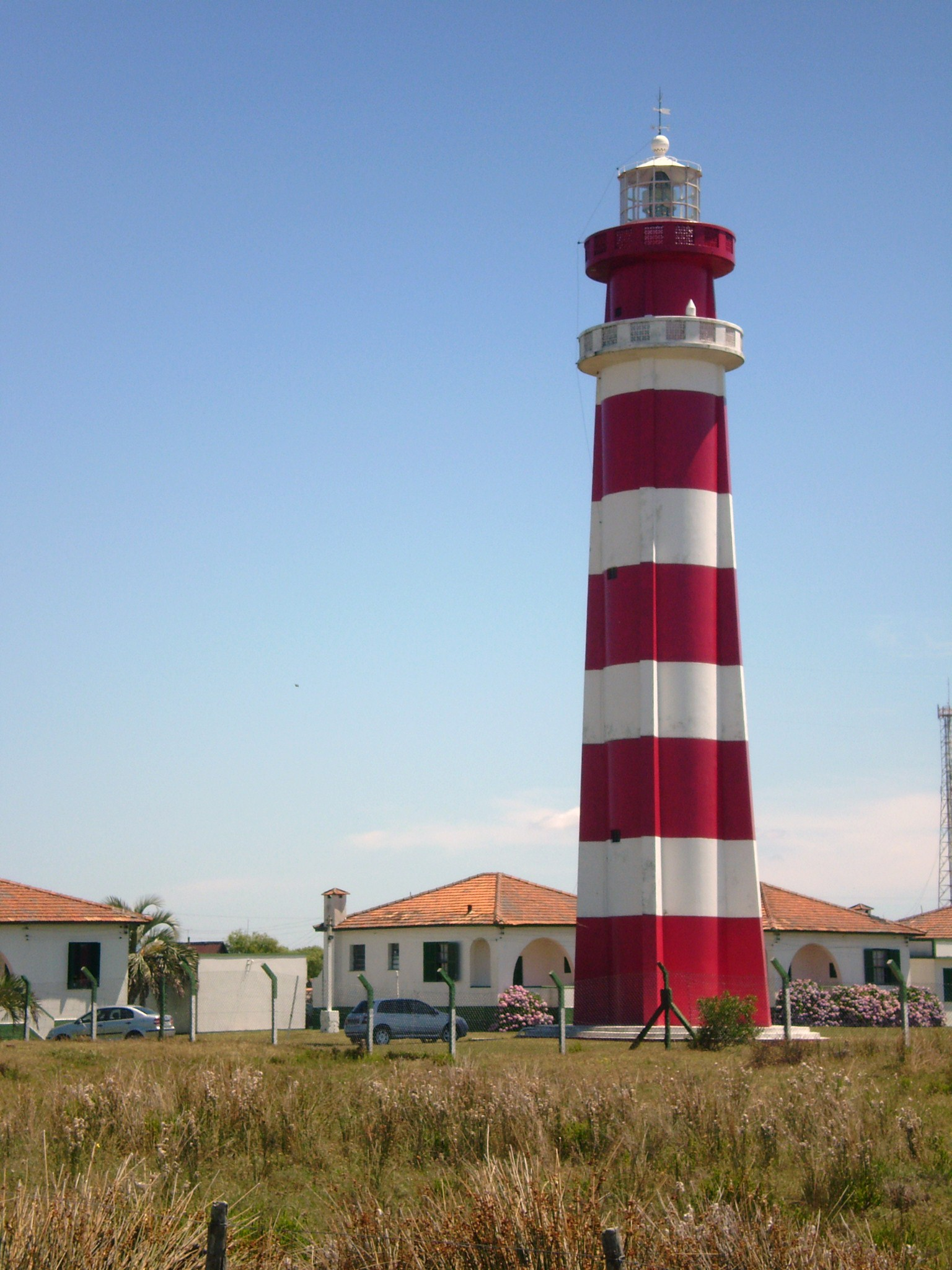
- Chui Lighthouse in 2007
- Location: Barra do Chuí; Rio Grande do Sul; Brazil
- Coordinates: 33°44′31″S 53°22′23″W

Tower
- Constructed: 1910 (first); 1934 (second)
- Foundation: concrete base
- Construction: concrete tower (current and second) skeletal metal tower (first)
- Height: 30 metres (98 ft) (current); 26 metres (85 ft) (first)
- Shape: cylindrical tower with four buttresses, double balcony and lantern (current)
- Markings: white and red horizontal band tower, white lantern (current)
- Power source: mains electricity

Light
- First lit: 1941 (current)
- Deactivated: 1934 (first); 1941 (second)
- Focal height: 42 metres (138 ft) (current)
- Range: 46 nautical miles (85 km; 53 mi) (current)
- Characteristic: Fl (2) W 35s.
- Brazil no.: BR-4660

Chuí Lighthouse (Portuguese: Farol do Chuí) is an active lighthouse in Barra do Chuí, at the mouth of Chuí Stream, just 1 kilometre (0.62 mi) from the Uruguayan border; the lighthouse is the southernmost of all the Brazilian lights.

== History ==
Chuí Lighthouse is the last of four lights scattered along 230 kilometres (140 mi) of dangerous coast from Rio Grande to Barra do Chuí. The first lighthouse, lit on 24 May 1910, was a red metal skeletal tower, built under the supervision of Alfred Kurt Schultze. The lantern was equipped with the 4 th order of Fresnel lens built by Barbier, Benard, et Turenne emitting a white and red light with a range of 18 nautical miles (33 km; 21 mi). In 1934 the skeletal tower was in poor conditions due to the corrosion, it was decided to build a new concrete tower, but some years later it was abandoned because of the instability of the foundation. The current light, built in 1941, is a tapered cylindrical concrete tower, 30 metres (98 ft) high, with double balcony and lantern; the tower is painted with red and white horizontal bands. The lantern emits two white flashes every 25 seconds visible up to 46 nautical miles (85 km; 53 mi). The lighthouse is managed by Brazilian Navy and is identified by the country code number BR-4660.

== See also ==
- List of lighthouses in Brazil
