= Port of Rio Grande =

Port in the city of Rio Grande, Brazil

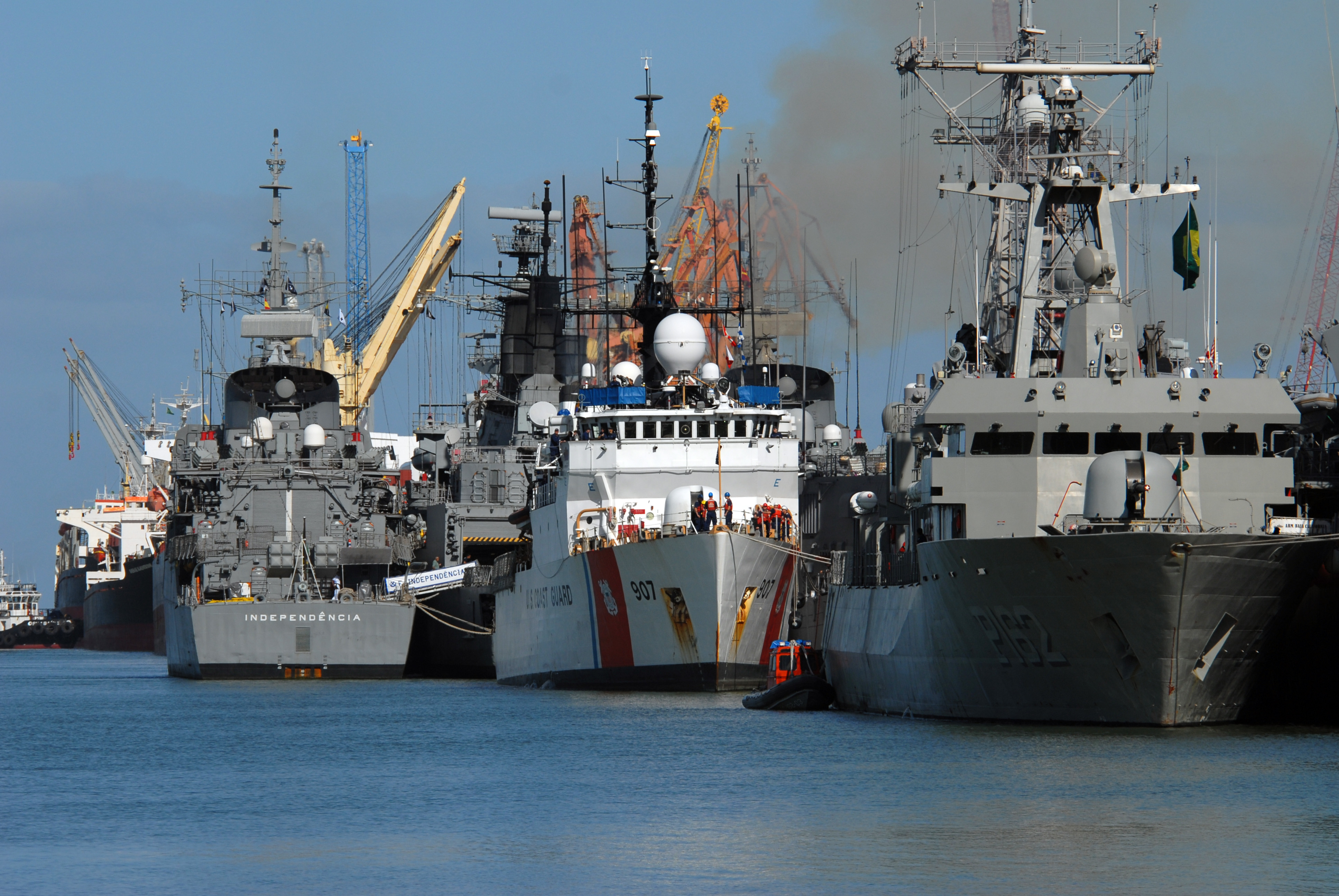
- Port of Rio Grande
- Interactive map of Port of Rio Grande

Location
- Country: Brazil
- Location: Rio Grande, Rio Grande do Sul
- Coordinates: 32°06′00″S 52°06′00″W

Details
- Opened: 1935
- Type of Harbor: Seaport

Statistics
- Annual cargo tonnage: 45.1 million tonnes (2021)
- Website; Official website

The Port of Rio Grande is one of the main ports of Brazil and Latin America. It's located in the city of Rio Grande, in the Brazilian state of Rio Grande do Sul. It's the third largest in the country.

The land access system to the port is made up of BR-392, BR-471 and BR-116. It is on the right bank of the North Channel, which connects Lagoa dos Patos with the Atlantic Ocean. The port bar is kept open by two breakwaters built at the mouth of the access channel.

It belongs to the Federal government of Brazil, but its administration and exploitation was granted, in 1997, to the State of Rio Grande do Sul, which does so through the Superintendency of Ports of Rio Grande do Sul (SUPRG), a state body linked to its Secretariat of Logistics and Transport, which since 2017, in addition to this port, manages the entire gaucho hydroport system.

In 2009, the Port handled around 150 million tons, equivalent to 3% of all national handling, making this port the third main port in Brazil.

Port activities in the town date back to 1737, the year the city was founded, however the construction of Porto Velho do Rio Grande began in 1869 and its inauguration took place on October 11, 1872. On June 2, In 1910 the execution of Porto Novo began, which came into operation on November 15, 1915, with the delivery to traffic of the first 500 meters of dock.

In 2003, the main products exported were: soybeans, soybean meal, wood chips, corn, wheat, rice, soybean oil, benzene, cellulose, cerrado wood. The main imports were: wheat, barley, urea, phosphates, fertilizers, potassium chloride, rice, ammonium sulphate, ammonium nitrate, petroleum coke, sea shells, salt, crude oil, sulfuric acid, LPG, phosphoric acid and ammonia.

Its area of influence includes the states of Rio Grande do Sul and Santa Catarina, Uruguay, southern Paraguay and northern Argentina.

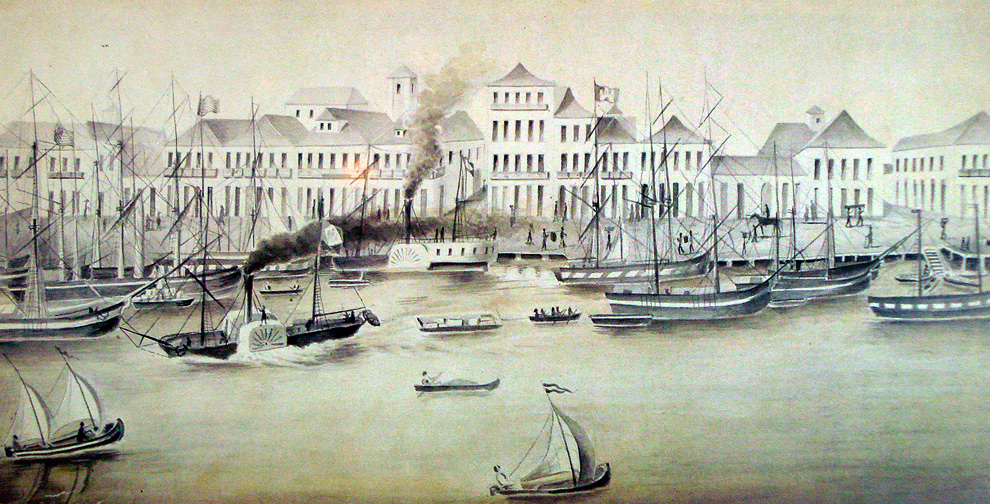
Herrmann Rudolf Wendroth: The port of Rio Grande in 1851.

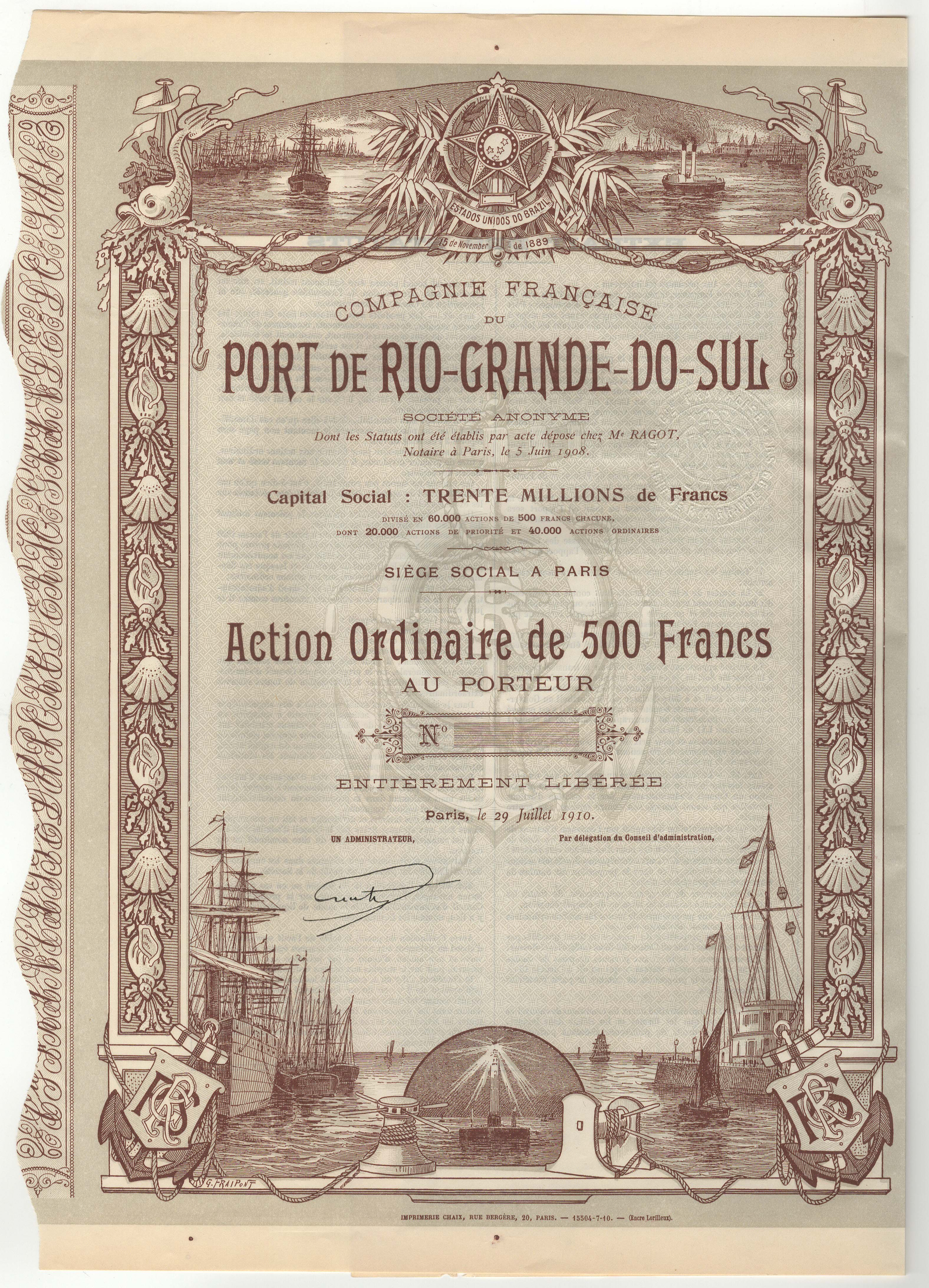
Share of the french company Port de Rio-Grande-do-Sul S. A., issued 29 July 1910
