= Barra do Chuí =

Beach resort in Brazil

Barra do Chuí, known officially as Praia da Barra do Chuí, is a resort in the municipality of Santa Vitória do Palmar, in Rio Grande do Sul. It is the southernmost resort in Rio Grande do Sul and Brazil, bordering Barra del Chuy in Uruguay, separated by the Chuí Stream, the southernmost extreme point of Brazil.

The Chuí Stream separates it from the Uruguayan homonymous spa in the Rocha Department. The border cities of Chuy (Uruguay) and Chuí (Brazil) rise a few kilometers away.

== See also ==
- Chuí Lighthouse
