= Uiramutã =

Municipality of Roraima, Brazil

- Municipality
- Município de Uiramutã
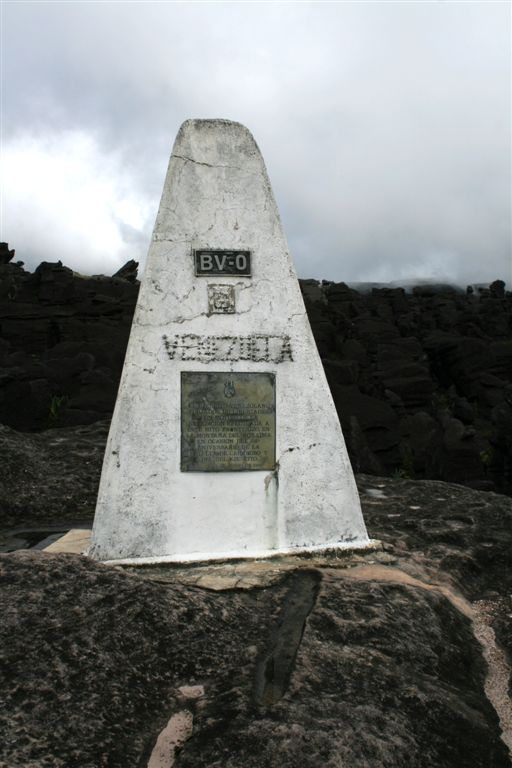
- Marker on the Brazil-Venezuela-Guyana border, Monte Roraima

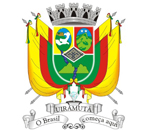
- Flag Coat of arms
- Motto: O Brasil começa aqui (Brazil starts here)
- Location of Uiramutã in the State of Roraima

- Location in Brazil
- Coordinates: 04°35′45″N 60°10′04″W
- Country: Brazil
- Region: North
- State: Roraima
- Founded: October 17, 1995

Government
  - Mayor: Manuel da Silva Araujo (PP)

Area
  - Total: 8,066 km^{2} (3,114 sq mi)
- Elevation: 804 m (2,638 ft)

Population (2022)
  - Total: 13,751
  - Density: 0.87/km^{2} (2.3/sq mi)
- Time zone: UTC−4 (AMT)
- HDI (2000): 0.542 – medium
- Website: uiramuta.rr.gov.br

Uiramutã (Brazilian Portuguese pronunciation: [wiɾamuˈtɐ̃]) is a municipality located in the northeast of the state of Roraima in Brazil. Its population is 10,789 (as of 2020) and its area is 8,066 km^{2}. It is the northernmost municipality of Brazil, with Monte Caburaí being the northernmost point. West of this mountain, there is also the Monte Roraima, the tallest mountain in Roraima and in Guyana, located in the triple frontier of Brazil, Guyana and Venezuela. Still, Uiramutã holds the title of the northernmost urban seat of a municipality in Brazil. Its counterparts in the South, West and East are respectively Chuí, state of Rio Grande do Sul; Mâncio Lima, Acre; and João Pessoa, Paraíba.

The municipality is located entirely inside the Raposa Serra do Sol Indigenous Territory. Because of this, its economic activities are limited. As a result, Uiramutã is also noted for being the Brazilian municipality that depends the most on government funds: 80% of its income is provided by the public administration, including social insurance and welfare programs such as the Bolsa Família.

The town of Uiramutã was established in 1911 by Severino Pereira da Silva, a gold miner, who founded the village for both the indigenous and non-indigenous community. Uiramutã became an independent municipality in 1995, and can be accessed via the RR-171 road.

The town was once claimed by the United Kingdom as part of British Guiana in a territorial dispute with Brazil before arbitration by the King of Italy in 1904 validated most of the British claim while deviating in awarding the area west of the present-day border and east of the Contigo River between the Takutu River to the south and its source at the Mt. Roraima tripoint to the north.

== Nature ==
The municipality contains the 116,748 hectares (288,490 acres) Monte Roraima National Park, a protected area created in 1989.
