= Santa Vitoria do Palmar meteorite =

Meteorite

- Type: Ordinary chondrite
- Class: L3
- Composition: Olivine (Fa_{0.5–35.2}), pyroxene (Fs_{0.5–31.6})
- Shock stage: S4
- Weathering grade: W2
- Country: Brazil
- Region: Santa Vitoria do Palmar
- Coordinates: 33°30′34″S 53°24′39″W
- Observed fall: Yes
- Fall date: 1997-06-25
- Found date: 2003-03 & 2004-02
- TKW: 50.4 kilograms (111 lb)

The Santa Vitoria do Palmar meteorite was found near the city of Santa Vitoria do Palmar in Brazil in 2003 (three stones) and 2004 (one stone).

== History ==
On June 25 1997 at 07:00 local time a dramatic blue and green fireball and coal black smoke trail set against a clear blue sky was witnessed by many people in the area.

The first three stones were found by Roberto Macielin while collecting Indian arrows in March 2003. The fourth by Lautaro Côrreira in February 2004.

As of December 2012, pieces of the Santa Vitoria do Palmar meteorite were advertised online at around US$8/g.

== Mineralogy ==
The surface of the meteorite is covered in a fusion crust with several indentations (regmaglypts). The meteorite is almost entirely made from chondrules. They range in size from 0.2–1.0 millimetre (0.0079–0.0394 in) with the largest being 4.5 millimetres (0.18 in) in diameter. Both the matrix and chondrules contain olivine and pyroxene. Accessory minerals include meteoric iron (kamacite, taenite and plessite), magnetite, troilite, plagioclase, schreibersite, maskelynite and chromite.

== Classification ==
The meteorite is classified as an Ordinary chondrite of the L group. The petrologic type is 3. Shock stage is 3 or 4 and weathering is class 2.

== See also ==
- Glossary of meteoritics
