= Monte Caburaí =

Mountain in Brazil and Guyana

Highest point
- Elevation: 1,465 m (4,806 ft)
- Coordinates: 05°16′20″N 60°12′43″W

Geography
- Location: Brazil - Guyana
- Region: Roraima
- Region: Cuyuni-Mazaruni

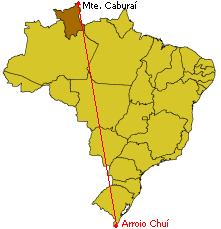
Location of Mount Caburaí in Brazil, in opposition to the country's southernmost point, Barra do Chuí.

Monte Caburaí is a mountain located on the border between Brazil and Guyana standing at 1,465 metres (4,806 ft) above sea level. It is the northernmost point of Brazil and is the source of the Ailã River.

== See also ==
- Extreme points of Brazil
