= Palestinian Brazilians =

Palestinian Brazilian Palestino-brasileiro فلسطينيو البرازيل
- (Brazil) (Palestine)

Total population
- 365,000

Regions with significant populations
- Rio Grande do Sul, Aracaju, São Paulo, Curitiba

Languages
- Palestinian Arabic, Portuguese

Religion
- Roman Catholicism and Islam

Related ethnic groups
- Other Brazilian and Palestinian people Asian Brazilians

Palestinian Brazilians (Portuguese: Palestino-brasileiro; Arabic: فلسطينيو البرازيل, romanized: Filasṭīnīyū al-Barāzīl) are Brazilian people with Palestinian ancestry, or Palestinian-born immigrants in Brazil.

== Palestinian refugees in Brazil ==
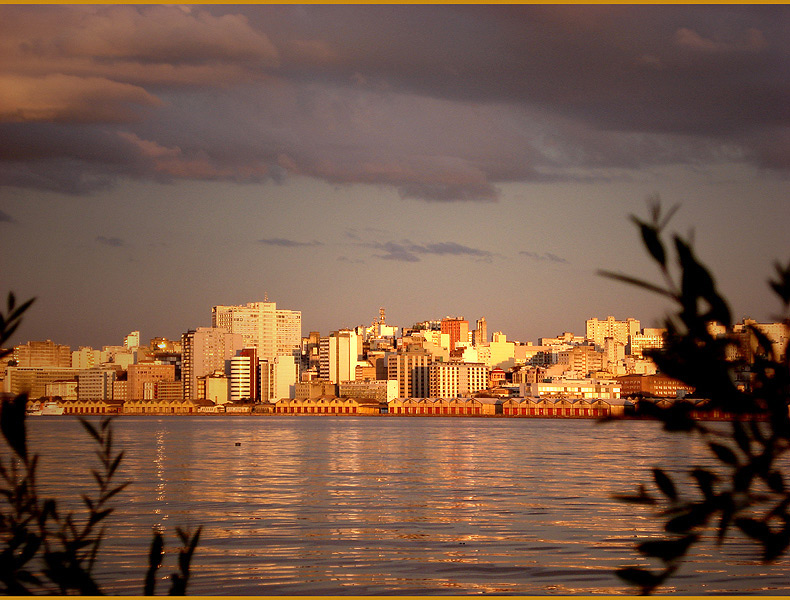
Greater Porto Alegre received many Palestinian refugees

The starting point for the Palestinian exodus process to Brazil is the year 1948, with the Nakba, the expulsion that occurred after the Declaration of Independence of the State of Israel and the Arab-Israeli war that subsequently began. In addition to the first wave of immigration after 1948, other immigration movements occurred after conflicts between Palestine and Israel in the second half of the 20th century, especially after the Six-Day War of 1967, the Massacre of Sabra and Shatila in 1982 and the First Intifada in 1987.

The exact numbers related to Palestinian immigration (especially in the so-called first wave) are difficult to specify, as many of the immigrants entered Brazil and other Latin American countries in different ways: while some entered with the status of Palestinian refugees, others immigrated using documents of Israel and Jordan.

The choice to use Israeli or Jordanian documents gave immigrants a certain independence of travel and citizenship, since Palestinian refugee status would not guarantee them the benefits of belonging to a national state, in addition to the precarious conditions of refugee camps.

It is estimated that 60,000 Palestinian immigrants and refugees, including their descendants, live in the country, the majority of them in São Paulo, according to a survey by the Arab-Palestinian Federation of Brazil (Fepal). Most settled in the state of São Paulo, the most populous and wealthiest in the nation.

In 2023, over 325 asylum applications were received from Palestinians and sixty from Arab-Israelis. These requests are still awaiting a decision from the Brazilian National Committee for Refugees (Conare). The information is from the Ministry of Justice and Public Security of Brazil.

== See also ==
- Immigration to Brazil
- Arab Brazilians
- Asian Brazilians
- Comitê Brasileiro de Interesse Nacional Palestino
