= Lagoa Mangueira =

Lagoon in Rio Grande do Sul, Brazil

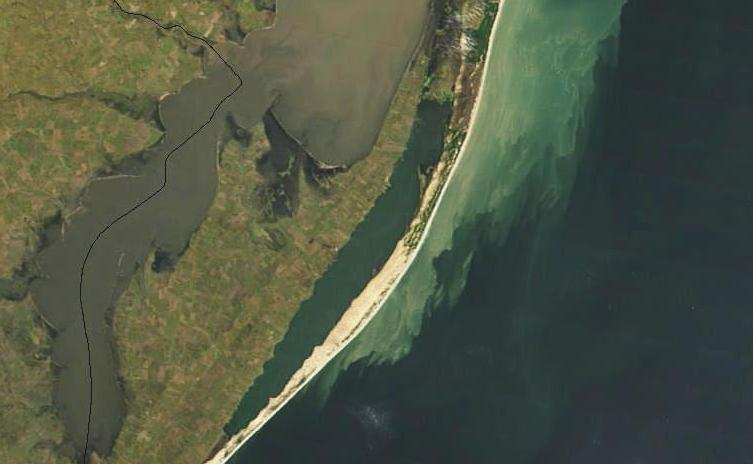
- Lagoa dos Patos is the largest lagoon in Brazil, in the state of Rio Grande do Sul.

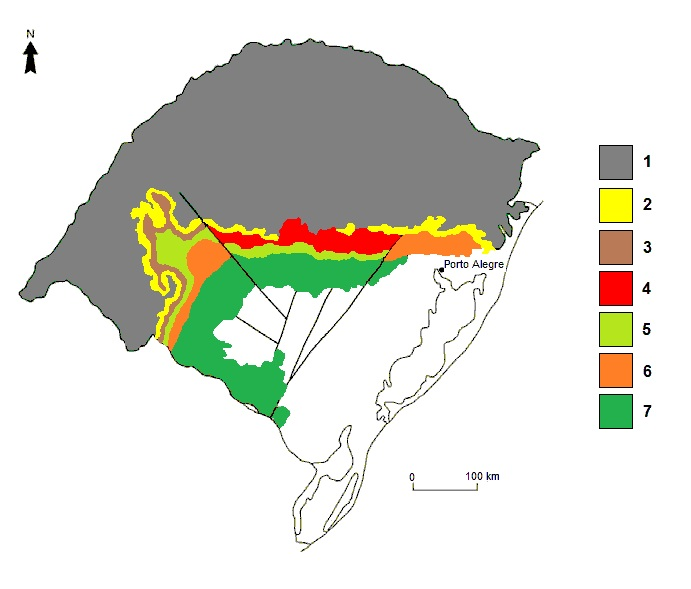
- Location within Paleorrota
- Location: Santa Vitória do Palmar
- Coordinates: 33°06′S 52°48′W
- Basin countries: Brazil
- Surface area: 800 km^{2} (310 sq mi)

Lagoa Mangueira is a lagoon located in the state of the Rio Grande Do Sul, in southern Brazil.

Lagoa Mangueira is 123 kilometers long and has a total area of 800 square kilometers. It is located in the municipality of Santa Vitória do Palmar and contains the southernmost point of Brazil. It is more than 500 kilometers from the state capital, Porto Alegre, almost on the border with Uruguay, with no urban concentrations nearby except for Santa Vitória do Palmar.
