= Chui Mosque =

Mosque in Chuí, Rio Grande do Sul, Brazil

- Portuguese: Mesquita Chui
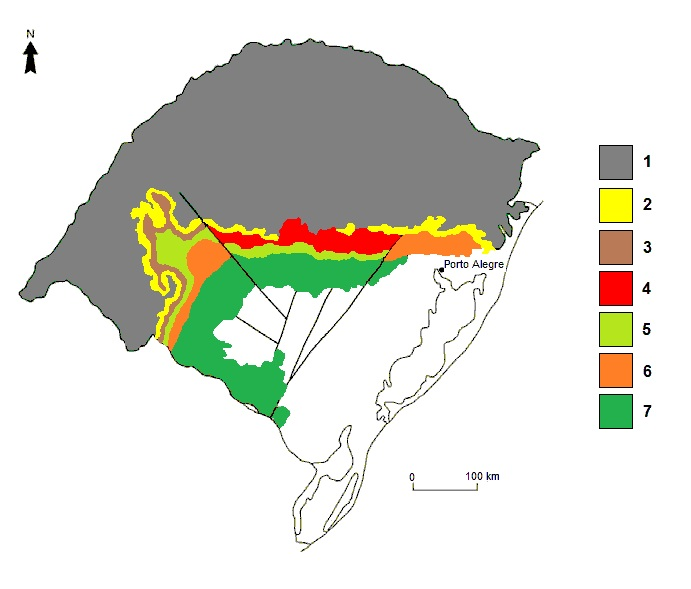
- Location within Paleorrota

Religion
- Affiliation: Islam
- Ecclesiastical or organizational status: Mosque
- Status: Active

Location
- Location: 364 Palestina Street, Chuí, Rio Grande do Sul
- Country: Brazil
- Interactive map of Chui Mosque
- Coordinates: 33°41′18.3″S 53°27′37.3″W

Architecture
- Type: Mosque architecture
- Groundbreaking: 2007

Specifications
- Capacity: 150 worshippers
- Interior area: 520 m^{2} (5,600 sq ft)
- Dome: One
- Dome height (outer): 19 m (62 ft)
- Minaret: One

The Chui Mosque (Portuguese: Mesquita Chui) is a mosque in Chuí, Rio Grande do Sul, Brazil.

== History ==
The construction of the mosque started in 2007. However, half way it was halted due to economical crisis. As of February 2021, it was reported that the mosque is open for services, despite the work on the mosque incomplete.

The mosque can accommodate up to 150 worshippers in its 520-square-metre (5,600 sq ft) main prayer hall. It is divided into two floors where the ground floor is for male patrons and the upper floor is for female. It consists of a minaret and a dome that has an outer height of 19 metres (62 ft).

== See also ==
- Islam in Brazil
- List of mosques in Brazil
