= Cabo Almi =

Brazilian politician (1962–2021)

State Deputy of Mato Grosso do Sul
- In office 1 February 2011 – 24 May 2021

Personal details
- Born: José Almi Pereira Moura; 17 December 1962 Jardim Olinda
- Died: May 24, 2021 (aged 58) Campo Grande
- Spouse: Irene Carolina de Oliveira (1987-2021)
- Occupation: Political; Military

José Almi Pereira Moura full name of Cabo Almi, born on 17 December 1962, in Jardim Olinda and died on 24 May 2021, in Campo Grande, was a Brazilian politician was a member of the Workers Party. In 1987 he married Irene Carolina de Oliveira who had three children Flávio, Fabrícia e Monique.

== Biography ==
Almi was born in Jardim Olinda. He was a member of the Legislative Assembly of Mato Grosso from 2011 until his death in 2021.

Born in Jardim Olinda, José Almi Pereira Moura started to live in Mato Grosso do Sul when he was still a child, taking up residence in the district of Lagoa Bonita, in Deodápolis. In 1982, he moved to Campo Grande. He worked as a bus collector, packer and sales promoter for the food industry and also graduated as a lathe operator at SENAI. In 1988, he was promoted by the Military Police of Mato Grosso do Sul.

== Political career ==
In 1996, he began his political career when he was elected councilor in Campo Grande and re-elected for three terms. In the 2010 elections, he was elected state deputy and reelected for two more terms, in 2014 and 2018.

== Death ==
Almi died in Campo Grande, on 24 May 2021, of COVID-19 during the COVID-19 pandemic in Brazil. The Governor of Mato Grosso do Sul, Reinaldo Azambuja decreed three days of mourning for his death.
