= Santa Vitória do Palmar =

Municipality of Rio Grande do Sul, Brazil

- Municipality
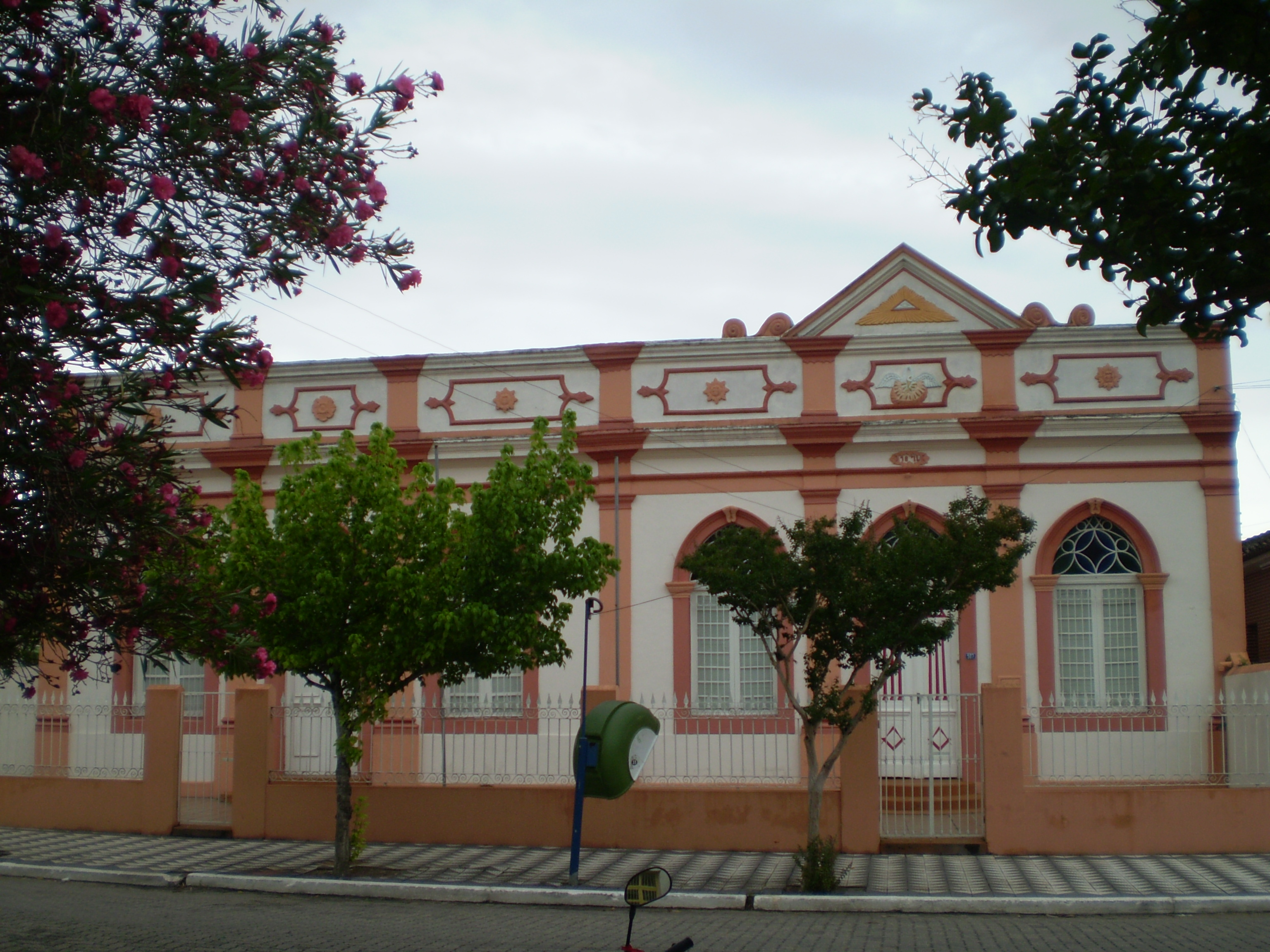

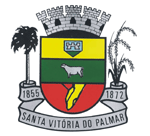
- Flag Coat of arms

- Location in Rio Grande do Sul, Brazil

- Location in Brazil
- Coordinates: 33°31′08″S 53°22′05″W
- Country: Brazil
- Region: South
- State: Rio Grande do Sul
- Founded: 1872

Government
  - Mayor: André Selayaran (MDB)

Area
  - Total: 5,244 km^{2} (2,025 sq mi)
- Elevation: 23 m (75 ft)

Population (2020)
  - Total: 29,483
  - Density: 6.64/km^{2} (17.2/sq mi)
- Demonym: Vitoriense
- Time zone: UTC−3 (BRT)
- Website: www.santavitoria.rs.gov.br

Santa Vitória do Palmar (lit. "Saint Victoria of the Palms") is a Brazilian city and municipality. It is the southernmost municipality in Brazil, located in the state of Rio Grande do Sul. To the west of the municipality is the Lagoa Mirim and beyond that is Uruguay; to the east and southeast lies the Atlantic Ocean, and to the north is the city of Rio Grande. To the south, it borders the municipality of Chuí and Uruguay.

The city proper is located approximately 16 km (9.9 mi) inland from the Atlantic, 8 km (5.0 mi) east of Lagoa Mirim and 20 km (12 mi) north of the Uruguayan border at Chuí. The city is traversed by the Brazilian federal highway BR-471, the most important road link between Brazil and Uruguay. It is 504 km (313 mi) by road from the state capital, Porto Alegre, and about 370 km (230 mi) from Uruguay's capital, Montevideo.

Santa Vitória do Palmar used to be the southernmost city in Brazil, until the former village of Chuí was split from its territory and incorporated as a new city in 1997. However, while the urban seat of Chuí is more southerly, the territory of Santa Vitória do Palmar still extends slightly further south than Chuí's, and contains Brazil's southernmost geographic point, located on a bend of the Chuí River just upstream from its mouth on the Atlantic Ocean, near the village of Barra do Chuí, which also belongs to the municipality.

The municipality lies on a windy coastal plain which is a mosaic of sand dunes, lagoons (Lagoa Mangueira being the largest one), marshland spots and rice farms. This variety of different ecosystems side by side ensures a rich biodiversity, protected in the municipality's northern part in the Taim Ecological Station, shared with Rio Grande. The city's economy is based on rice growing, beef cattle and sheep raised for wool, in addition to being a transit point on BR-471, the main highway linking Brazil and Uruguay.

Santa Vitória do Palmar is a large municipality, about 160 km (99 mi) long north–south. Its coast also includes the larger part of Cassino Beach, the world's longest uninterrupted stretch of sandy ocean shore, over 240 km (150 mi) from the stony breakwaters of Rio Grande in the north to the mouth of Chuí River in the south. Two small beach resort villages are located in the municipality: Praia do Hermenegildo and Barra do Chuí, which is Brazil's southernmost inhabited place.

Four stones from the Santa Vitoria do Palmar meteorite was found near the town in 2003 and 2004.

== Geography ==
=== Climate ===
Santa Vitória do Palmar has a mild humid subtropical climate (Cfa, according to the Köppen climate classification), bordering an oceanic climate (Cfb), as the mean temperature in the hottest month is just above 22 °C.

Climate data for Santa Vitória do Palmar (1991–2020 normals, extremes 1931–1984 and 1988–present)
Month	Jan	Feb	Mar	Apr	May	Jun	Jul	Aug	Sep	Oct	Nov	Dec	Year
Record high °C (°F)	41.3 (106.3)	41.0 (105.8)	38.5 (101.3)	34.4 (93.9)	32.2 (90.0)	28.4 (83.1)	29.3 (84.7)	32.2 (90.0)	33.8 (92.8)	34.8 (94.6)	38.4 (101.1)	39.9 (103.8)	41.3 (106.3)
Mean daily maximum °C (°F)	27.8 (82.0)	27.4 (81.3)	26.2 (79.2)	23.3 (73.9)	19.7 (67.5)	16.8 (62.2)	15.9 (60.6)	17.6 (63.7)	18.7 (65.7)	21.3 (70.3)	24.0 (75.2)	26.5 (79.7)	22.1 (71.8)
Daily mean °C (°F)	22.6 (72.7)	22.4 (72.3)	21.1 (70.0)	18.1 (64.6)	14.8 (58.6)	12.1 (53.8)	11.2 (52.2)	12.5 (54.5)	13.8 (56.8)	16.4 (61.5)	18.7 (65.7)	21.1 (70.0)	17.1 (62.8)
Mean daily minimum °C (°F)	18.4 (65.1)	18.3 (64.9)	17.1 (62.8)	14.3 (57.7)	11.2 (52.2)	8.6 (47.5)	7.8 (46.0)	8.8 (47.8)	10.0 (50.0)	12.5 (54.5)	14.4 (57.9)	16.7 (62.1)	13.2 (55.8)
Record low °C (°F)	7.0 (44.6)	7.8 (46.0)	6.4 (43.5)	3.6 (38.5)	0.4 (32.7)	−2.0 (28.4)	−3.0 (26.6)	−1.6 (29.1)	−0.4 (31.3)	2.2 (36.0)	2.4 (36.3)	2.4 (36.3)	−3.0 (26.6)
Average precipitation mm (inches)	81.4 (3.20)	128.0 (5.04)	116.4 (4.58)	123.3 (4.85)	119.2 (4.69)	113.1 (4.45)	112.7 (4.44)	108.2 (4.26)	97.0 (3.82)	102.4 (4.03)	70.0 (2.76)	91.5 (3.60)	1,263.2 (49.73)
Average precipitation days (≥ 1.0 mm)	6	8	7	7	7	8	7	8	7	8	6	7	86
Average relative humidity (%)	75.2	77.6	79.6	81.2	84.3	85.1	84.5	83.6	81.8	80.1	75.7	74.5	80.3
Mean monthly sunshine hours	257.5	212.0	211.5	175.5	151.1	132.7	143.1	155.5	161.8	196.5	233.9	253.2	2,284.3
Source: Instituto Nacional de Meteorologia

== Gallery ==
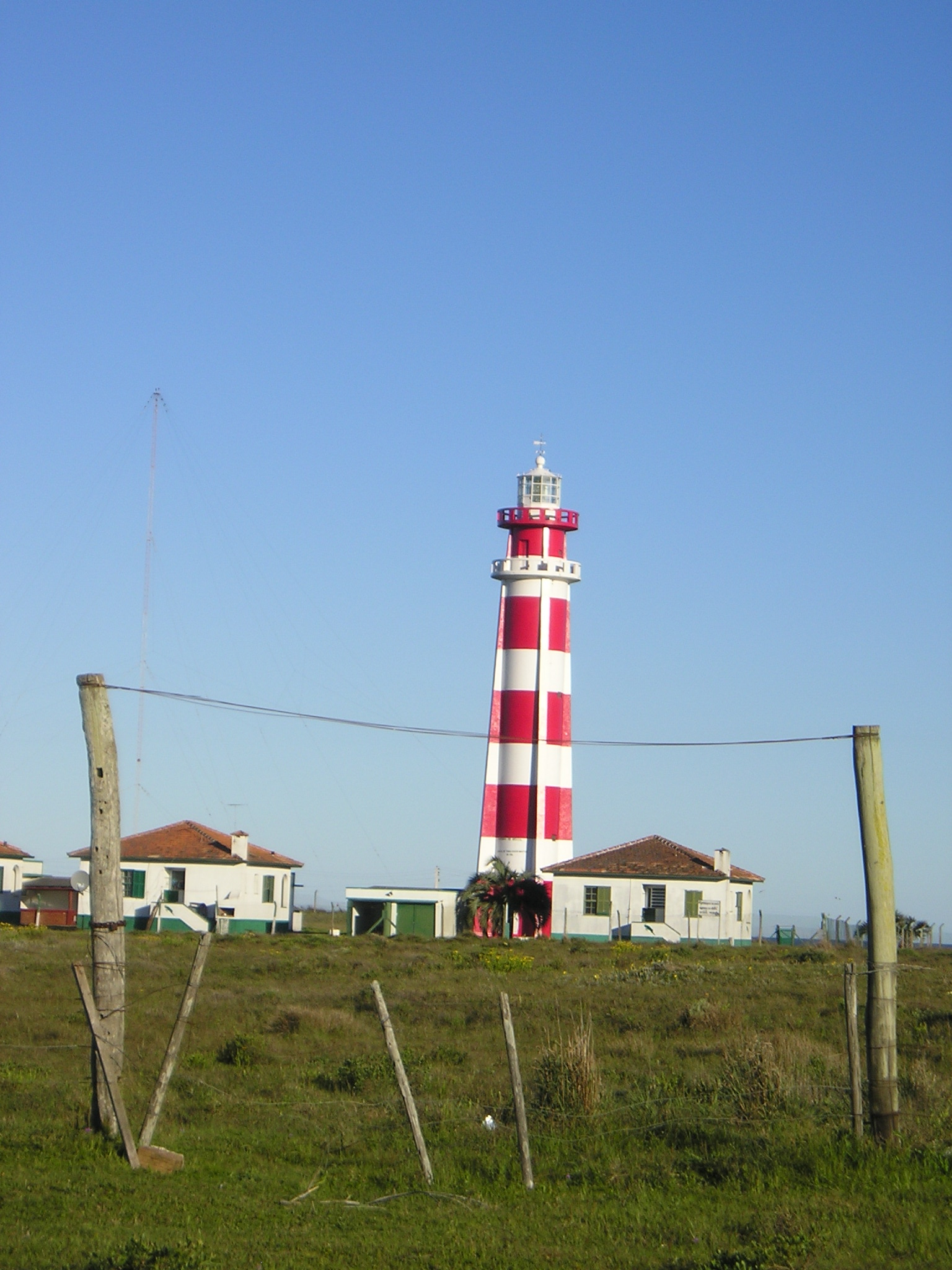

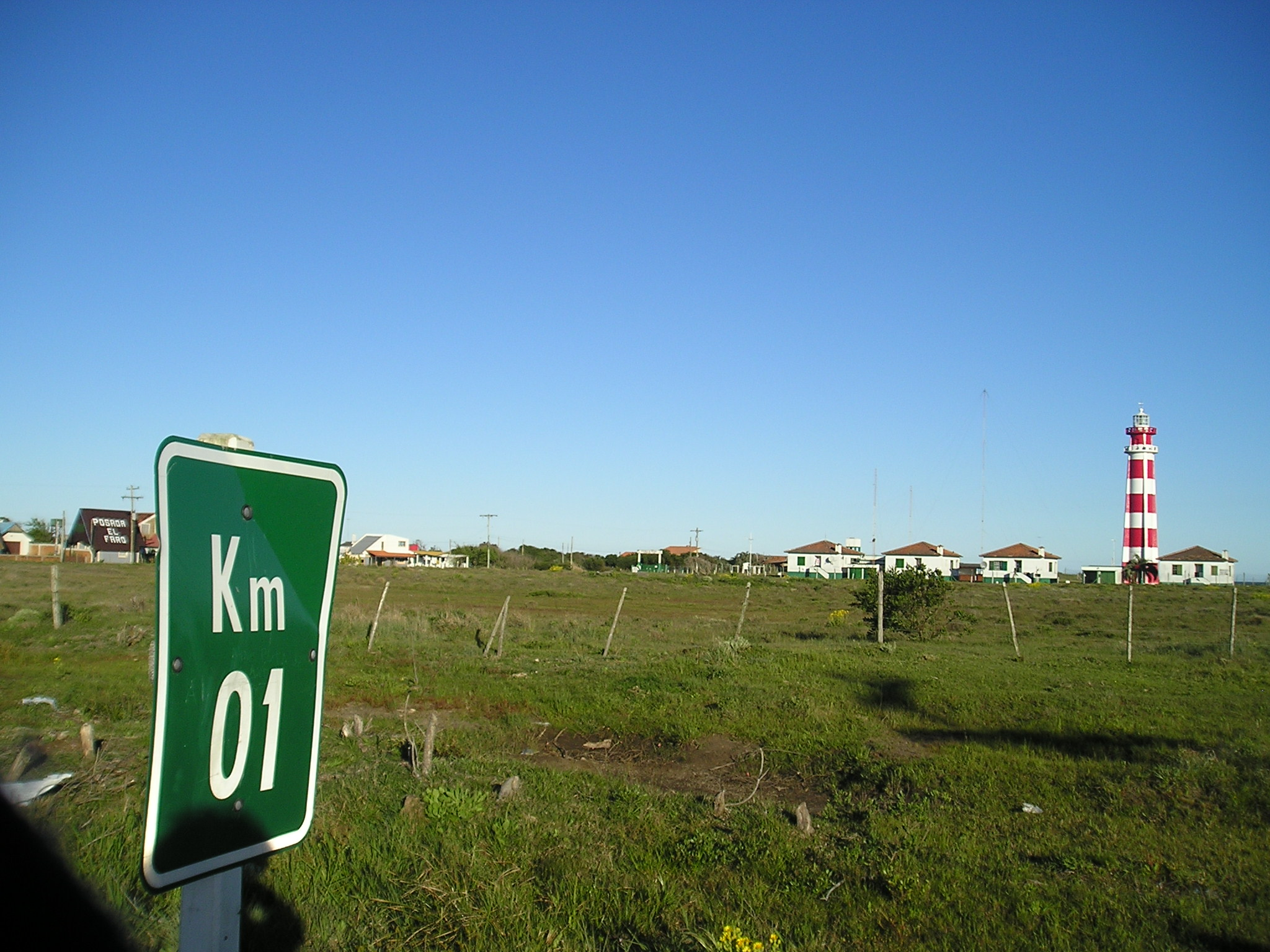

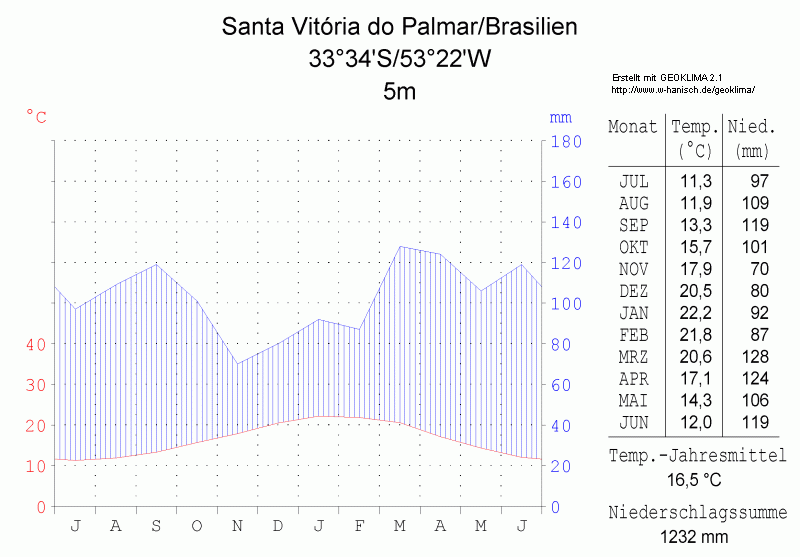

== See also ==
- List of municipalities in Rio Grande do Sul
