= Alpestre =

Municipality of Rio Grande do Sul, Brazil

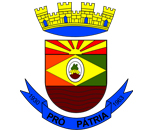
- Flag Coat of arms

- Location of Alpestre
- Coordinates: 27°14′56″S 53°02′06″W
- Country: Brazil
- Region: South
- State: Rio Grande do Sul
- Founded: April 13, 1963

Government
  - Mayor: Valdir Jose Zasso (PDT)

Area
  - Total: 328.749 km^{2} (126.931 sq mi)

Population (2020)
  - Total: 6,067
- Time zone: UTC−3 (BRT)
- HDI (2000): 0.714 – medium

Alpestre (Portuguese: [awˈpɛs.tɾi]) is the northernmost municipality in the state of Rio Grande do Sul, Brazil. The city lies near the Uruguay River, at its northernmost point. A landmark called Ponto Extremo Norte (Extreme North Point) marks the northernmost point of the state.

== See also ==
- List of municipalities in Rio Grande do Sul
