= Penaforte =

Municipality in Ceará, Brazil

- Flag Coat of arms
- Nickname: "Jeri"
- Location of Penaforte in Ceará
- Coordinates: 07°49′44″S 39°04′37″W
- Country: Brazil
- Region: Northeast
- State: Ceará

Government
  - Mayor: Nicolau Vieira Angelo (PSDB)

Area
  - Total: 150.536 km^{2} (58.122 sq mi)

Population (2020)
  - Total: 9,143
  - Density: 57.96/km^{2} (150.1/sq mi)
- Time zone: UTC−3 (BRT)
- HDI (2000): 0.687 – medium

Penaforte is the southernmost municipality in the Brazilian state of Ceará, bordering the state of Pernambuco.
