= Soledade =

Municipality in Rio Grande do Sul, Brazil

Coordinates: 28.8258°S 52.5084°W

- Municipality
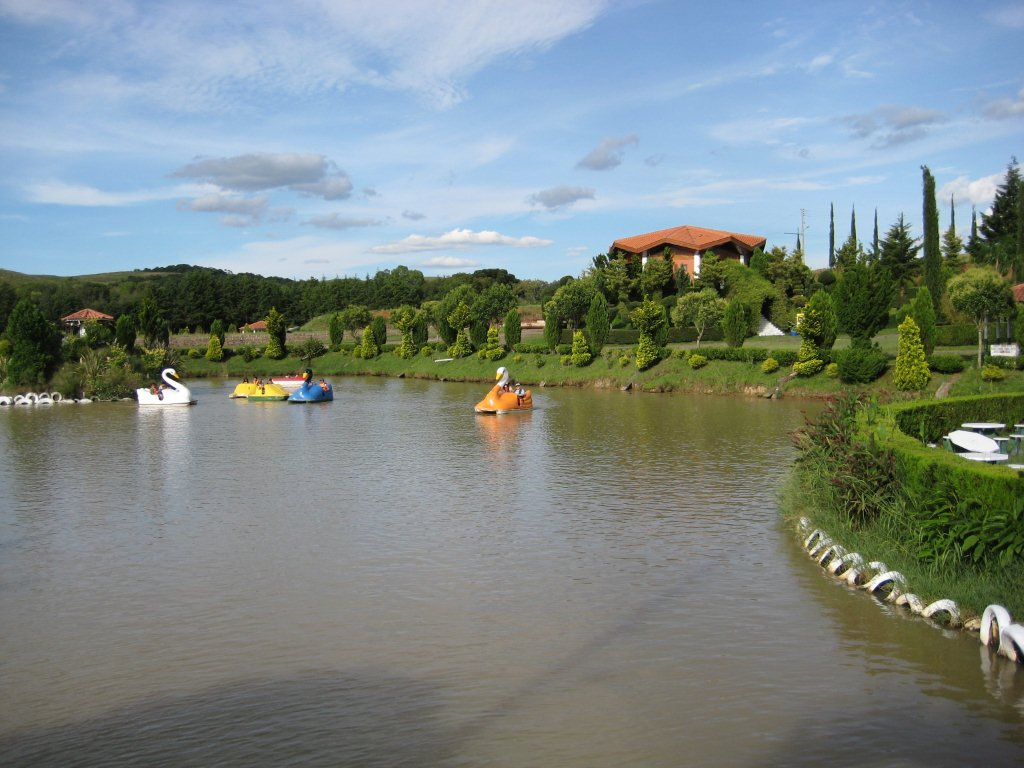
- Tuias Park, in Soledade, Rio Grande do Sul, Brazil

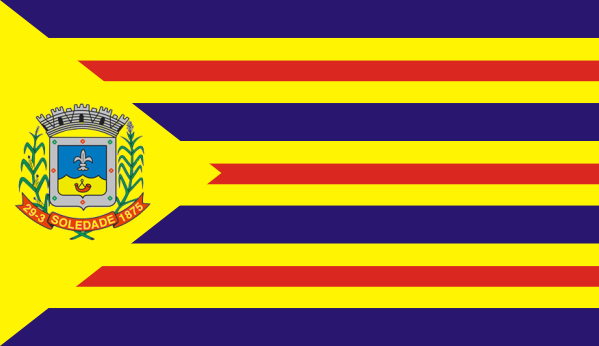
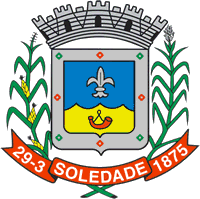
- Flag Coat of arms
- Nickname: "Cidade das Pedras Preciosas" (City of Precious Stones)
- Location of Soledade in Rio Grande do Sul
- Country: Brazil
- Region: South
- State: Rio Grande do Sul
- Mesoregion: Noroeste Rio-Grandense
- Microregion: Soledad
- Founded: 29 March 1875

Government
  - Mayor: Marilda Borges Corbelini (MDB, 2021 - 2024)

Area
  - Total: 1,215.056 km^{2} (469.136 sq mi)

Population (2021)
  - Total: 31,067
  - Density: 25.568/km^{2} (66.222/sq mi)
- Demonym: Soledadense
- Time zone: UTC−3 (BRT)
- Website: Official website

Soledade is a municipality in Rio Grande do Sul, Brazil. The city is nicknamed the Cidade das Pedras Preciosas meaning the City of Precious Stones or Rare Gems. Much of the amethyst sold in the world comes from the mines of Rio Grande do Sul near Soledade. Most of the factories in Soledade process and sell these stones internationally. As of 2020, the estimated population was 31,035.

Its other famous export apart from its precious stones, is Fábio Rochemback who played football for Grêmio.

Another notable citizen was Joaquim Mauricio Cardoso, a lawyer, professor, and politician. He was the governor for the state of Rio Grande do Sul, having a public school in Soledade founded after him.

== Geography ==
=== Climate ===
Climate data for Soledade, elevation 530 m (1,740 ft), (1976–2005)
Month	Jan	Feb	Mar	Apr	May	Jun	Jul	Aug	Sep	Oct	Nov	Dec	Year
Mean daily maximum °C (°F)	26.9 (80.4)	26.4 (79.5)	25.2 (77.4)	22.4 (72.3)	19.8 (67.6)	16.9 (62.4)	16.8 (62.2)	18.6 (65.5)	19.0 (66.2)	21.8 (71.2)	24.0 (75.2)	25.9 (78.6)	22.0 (71.5)
Daily mean °C (°F)	22.0 (71.6)	21.9 (71.4)	20.5 (68.9)	18.0 (64.4)	15.3 (59.5)	12.7 (54.9)	12.7 (54.9)	14.1 (57.4)	14.5 (58.1)	17.2 (63.0)	19.1 (66.4)	21.0 (69.8)	17.4 (63.4)
Mean daily minimum °C (°F)	17.1 (62.8)	17.3 (63.1)	15.8 (60.4)	13.5 (56.3)	10.7 (51.3)	8.5 (47.3)	8.5 (47.3)	9.6 (49.3)	10.1 (50.2)	12.6 (54.7)	14.3 (57.7)	16.1 (61.0)	12.8 (55.1)
Average precipitation mm (inches)	168.0 (6.61)	150.0 (5.91)	137.0 (5.39)	141.0 (5.55)	153.0 (6.02)	152.0 (5.98)	169.0 (6.65)	124.0 (4.88)	160.0 (6.30)	235.0 (9.25)	152.0 (5.98)	168.0 (6.61)	1,909 (75.13)
Average relative humidity (%)	77	81	80	77	77	78	80	76	77	78	73	73	77
Mean monthly sunshine hours	247	202	209	187	184	157	170	173	164	210	234	229	2,366
Source 1: Empresa Brasileira de Pesquisa Agropecuária (EMBRAPA)
Source 2: Climatempo (precipitation)

== See also ==
- List of municipalities in Rio Grande do Sul
