= Chuí Stream =

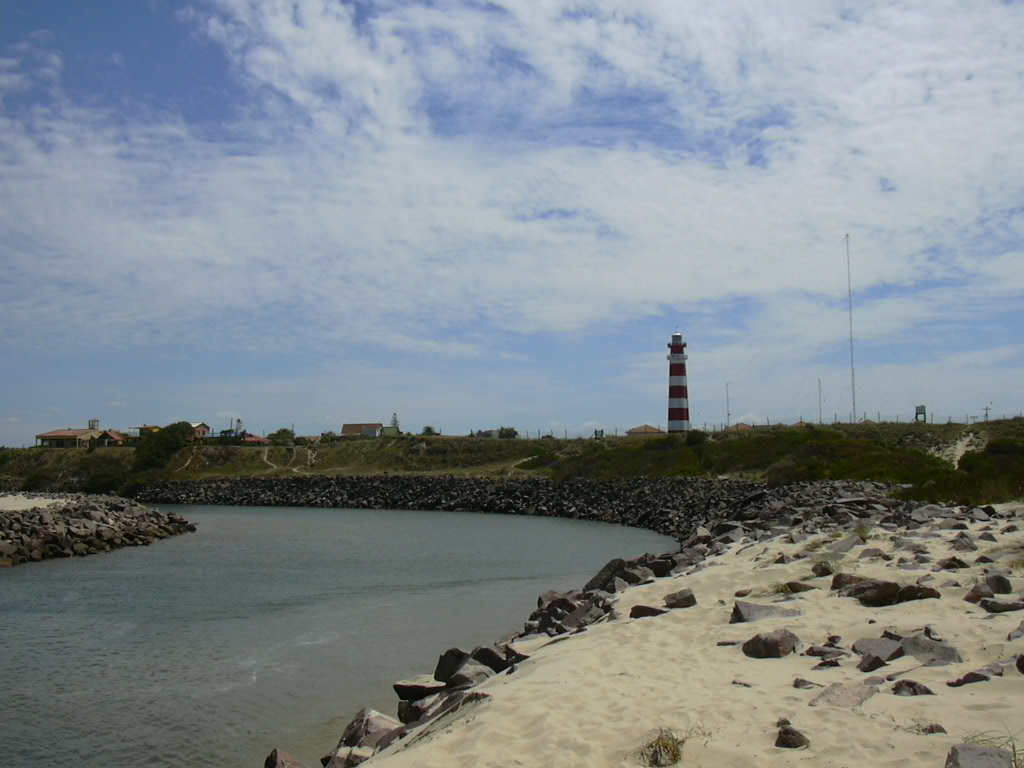

- Location of mouth

Location
- Country: Uruguay, Brazil

Physical characteristics
- Mouth
  - coordinates: 33°45′S 53°22′W

The Chuí, or Chuy, Stream (Portuguese: Arroio Chuí [ɐˈʁoju ʃuˈi], Rioplatense Spanish: Arroyo Chuy [aˈroʃo ˈtʃwi]), is a short stream on the Brazil–Uruguay border that is Brazil's southernmost point.

== Geography ==
The Chui rises in a small swamp in the sandy coastal plains of the far southern Brazilian state of Rio Grande do Sul. It runs initially southward, then turns east before flowing into the Atlantic Ocean. In its final course, the stream marks the last stretch of the Brazilian border with Uruguay. In Brazil, it lies mostly in the municipality of Santa Vitória do Palmar, with a short section in Chuí. The Uruguayan side belongs to the city of Chuy, in the department of Rocha.

The Chuí spans only a few tens of kilometres long and its water volume is relatively weak. This is why it is called an arroio or arroyo, which in Portuguese and Spanish means "stream", respectively. It would be unremarkable, were it not for the fact that it is known throughout Brazil and mentioned in all Brazilian geography schoolbooks as being the country's southernmost point. The most southerly point of Brazil is on a bend of the stream approximately 2.7 km (1.7 mi) upstream from its mouth, near the twin coastal villages of Barra do Chuí (Brazil) and Barra del Chuy (Uruguay), at 33°45′03.49″S 53°23′40.90″W.

The mouth of the Chuí Stream is not only the southernmost, but also the westernmost point of the Brazilian coast, as well as both the northernmost and easternmost point of the Uruguayan coast. It also marks the southern end of Cassino Beach, the world's longest uninterrupted stretch of sandy ocean shore, stretching over 240 km (150 mi) from the stone breakwaters of Rio Grande in its northern end.

== In popular culture ==
The widespread Brazilian Portuguese expression "do Oiapoque ao Chuí" ("from the Oiapoque to the Chuí [rivers]") is used to mean the whole nation, by mentioning the waterways that mark respectively the northern and southern extremities of the Brazilian coastline (the mouth of the Oiapoque River is often mistakenly thought to be the entire country's northernmost point, not only of its coast). The saying is used in the same way as Americans use the expression "from coast to coast."

== Gallery ==
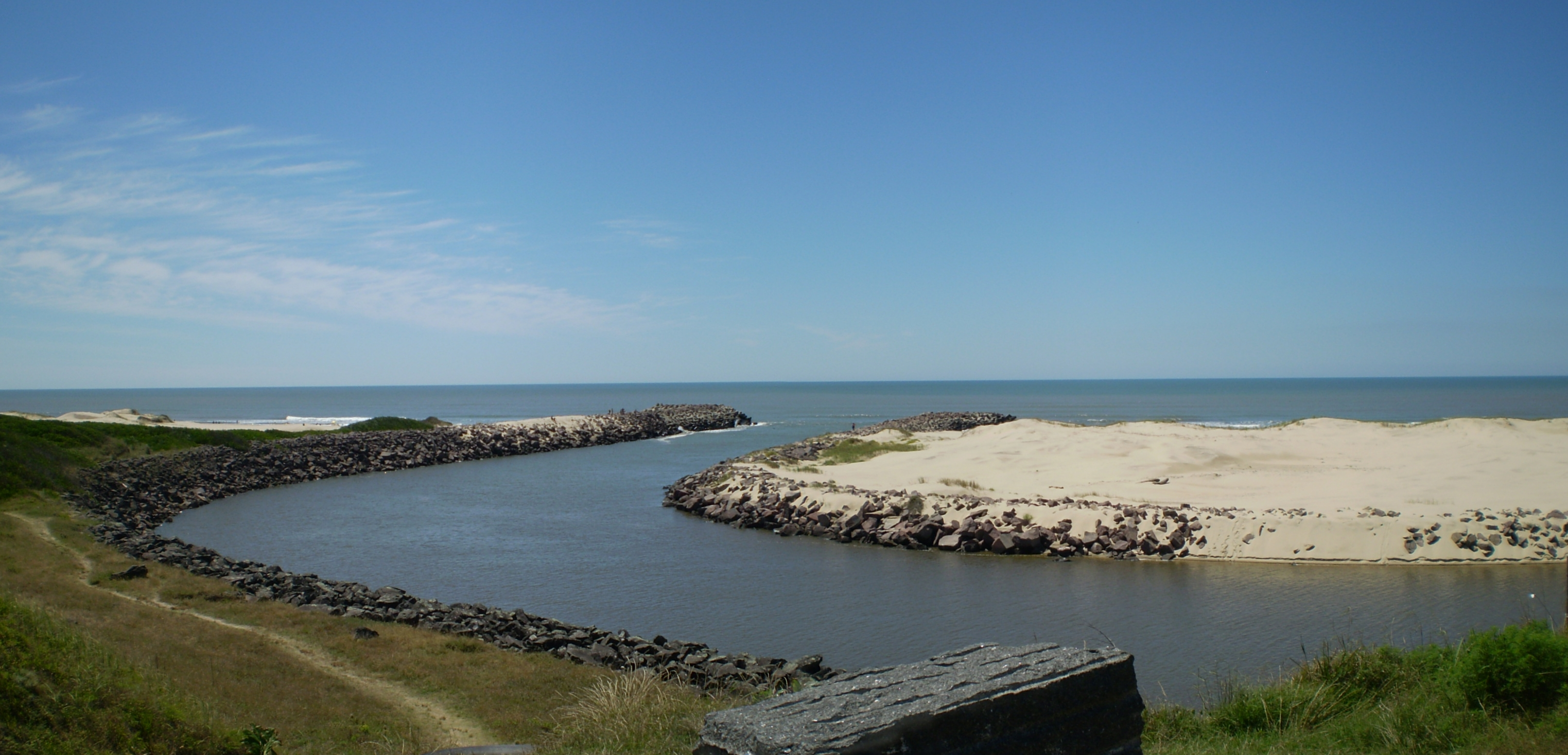
The mouth of Arroio Chuí on the Atlantic Ocean. Brazil on the left, Uruguay on the right.
The stone breakwater on the left is both the southernmost and the westernmost point of the Brazilian coast; the one on the right is both the northernmost and the easternmost point of the Uruguayan coast.

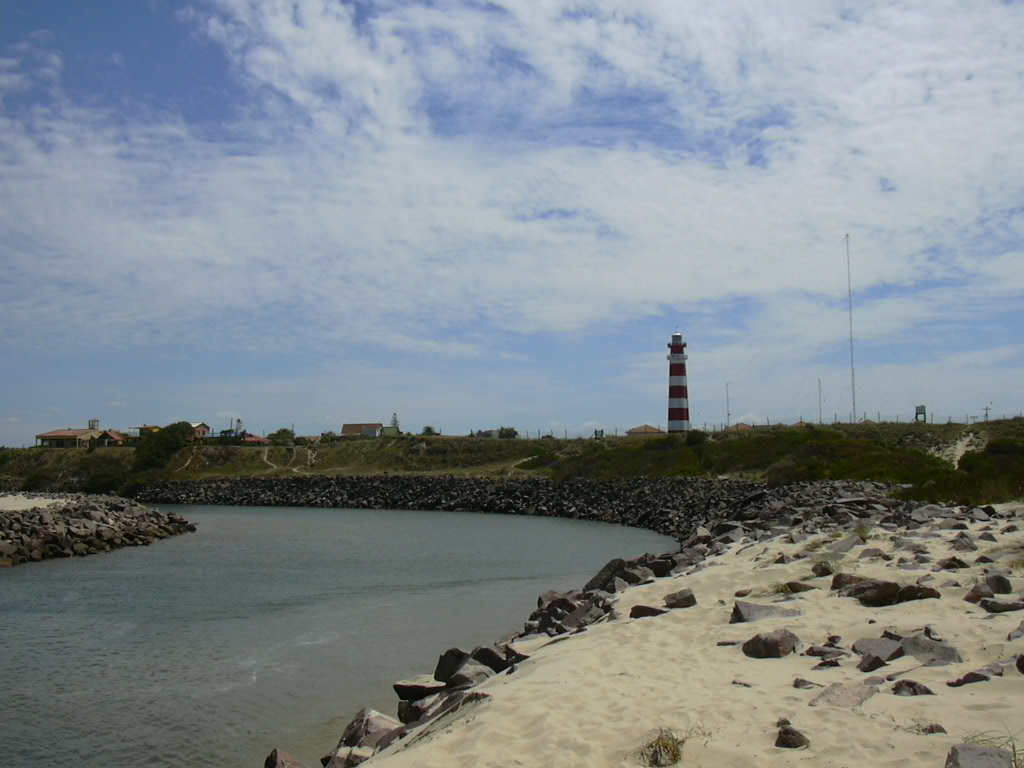
Lighthouse on the Brazilian side.

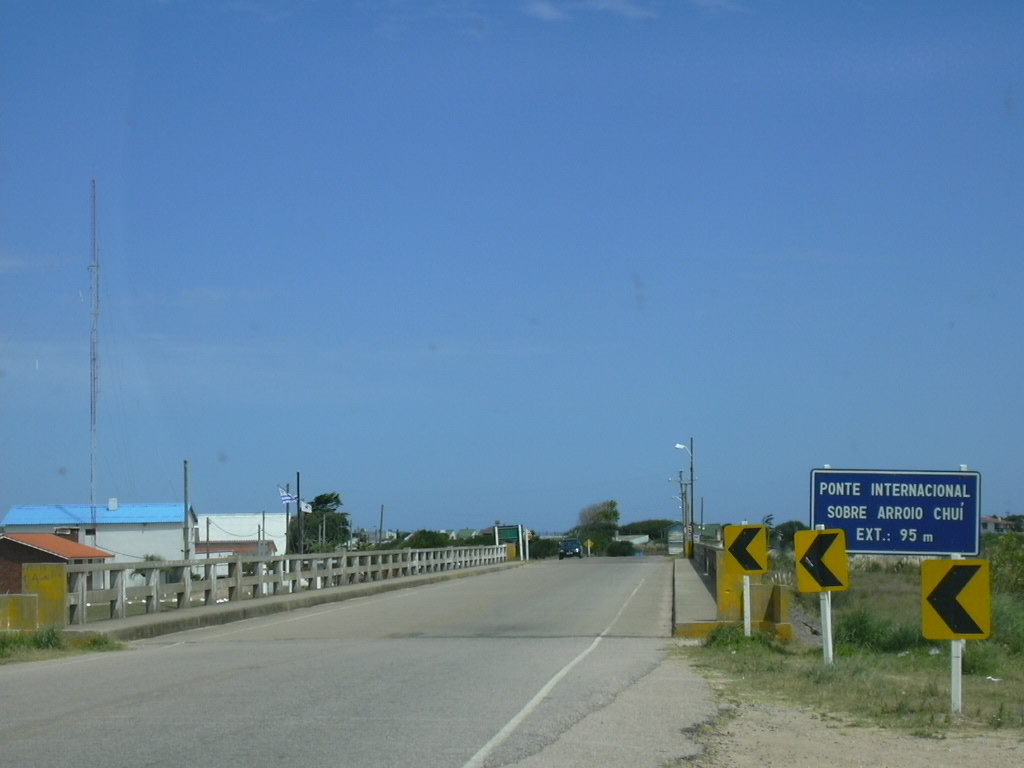
International bridge near the mouth, seen from the Brazilian side.

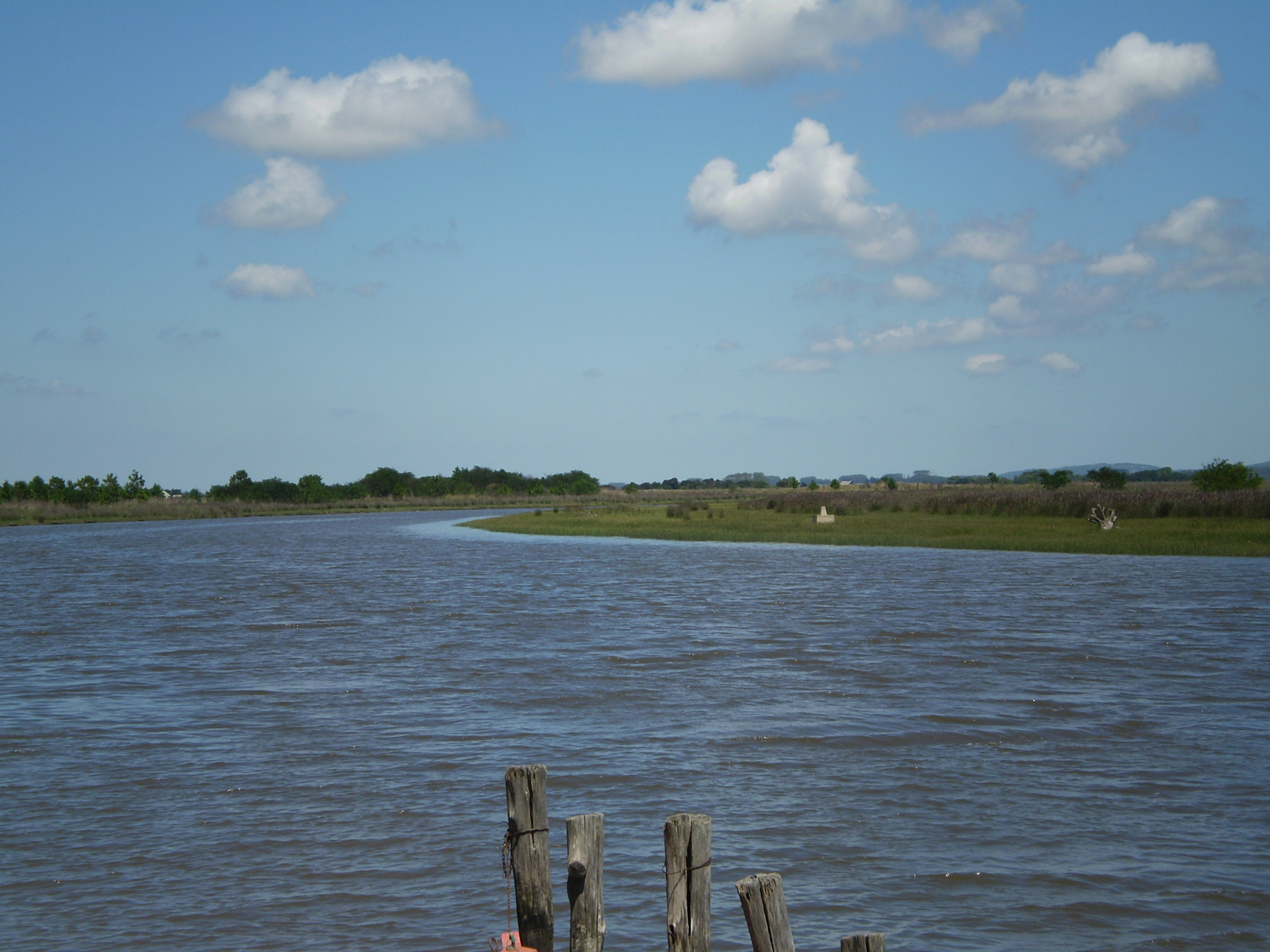
The exact southernmost point of Brazil, seen from the Uruguayan side.

== See also ==
- Extreme points of Brazil
- Chuí - nearby Brazilian city
- Chuy - nearby Uruguayan city
- Santa Vitória do Palmar - Brazilian municipality in whose territory most of the Chuí stream lies
