= Eli Almi =

Yiddish writer (1892–1963)

- אליהו־חײם שעפּס
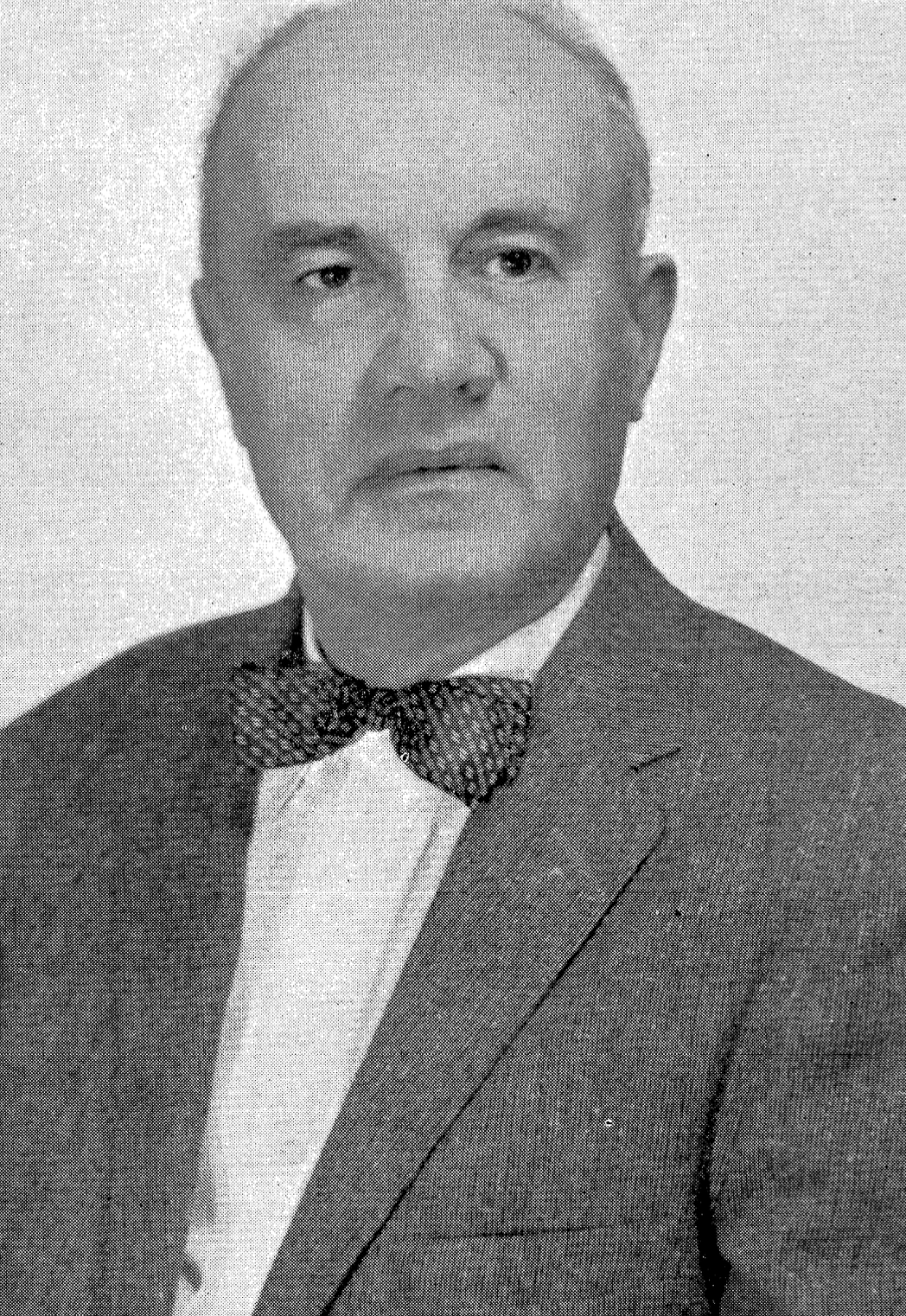
- Born: Eliyahu-Khayim Sheps; January 2, 1892; Warsaw, Congress Poland, Russian Empire
- Died: September 25, 1963 (aged 71); New York City, US
- Other names: A. Almi; Eli Elin; Elyash; L. Yash; Dr. B. Gitlin; Dr. E. Elkin; Sh. Eliyahu; E. Tishby; Eliyahu Zaydler; Kh. Reyzlin; E. Elshi; Kh. Elshi
- Occupations: Poet; essayist; journalist; mystic
- Years active: 1907–1954

Eliyahu-Khayim Sheps (Yiddish: אליהו־חײם שעפּס; January 2, 1892 – September 25, 1963), known primarily under the pseudonyms Eli Almi or A. Almi, was a Polish-born Jewish-American poet, journalist, essayist, and mystic, who wrote in both Yiddish and English. His work drew on philosophy, religion, occultism, satire, and lyric, and was often fantastical or dramatic in content and pathos.

On September 25, 1963, Sheps committed suicide.

He was celebrated by The Detroit Jewish News as "one of the most creative of the Yiddish writers." Isaac Bashevis Singer praised his mystic knowledge, comparing him to the likes of Hillel Zeitlin, who was also a friend.

== Biography ==
=== Early life ===
Eliyahu-Khayim Sheps was born on January 2, 1892 in Warsaw to father Shloyme Zalmen and Reyzl-Gitl Sheps. He was part of a poor Jewish family. Until the age of 10, he was educated in a cheder. In 1908, he moved to Kraków. On New Year's Day in 1913, a day before his 21st birthday, he immigrated to New York with the assistance of his only brother, Leyzer.

=== Career ===
In 1907, Sheps published his first poem in the literary magazine Roman-tsaytung (Yiddish: ראָמאַן־צײַטונג, lit. 'Novel Newspaper') in Warsaw at the age of 15, where his earliest literary sponsor was I. L. Peretz. In 1908, he moved to Kraków, where Avrom Reyzen published some of his poems. By the age of 18, he became the editorial secretary for the widely read Yiddish newspaper Der moment (Yiddish: דער מאָמענט, lit. 'The Moment'), where he first contributed. Upon arriving in the United States, he was also a frequent contributor to the Forverts (Yiddish: פֿאָרװערטס, lit. 'Forward'), Literarishe bleter (Yiddish: ליטעראַרישע בלעטער, lit. 'Literary Pages'), Fraye arbeter shtime (Yiddish: פֿרײַע אַרבעטער שטימע, lit. 'Free Voice of Labor'), Der morgn zshurnal (Yiddish: דער מאָרגן זשורנאַל, lit. 'The Morning Journal'), Der tog (Yiddish: דער טאָג, lit. 'The Day'), among others.

A spiritual study on the afterlife, his first book, Di tsveyte eksistents (Yiddish: די צװײטע עקסיסטענץ, lit. 'The Second Existence'), was published in New York and Montreal in 1921. His first poetry collection, Bay di randn (Yiddish: בײַ די ראַנדן, lit. 'On the Edges'), was published in New York in 1923.

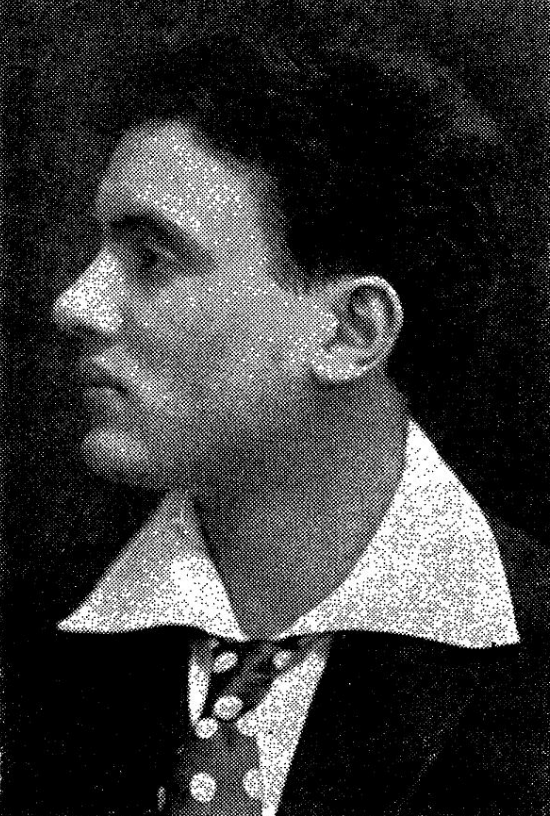
Eli Almi in 1913, after his arrival in New York

In 1962, a year before his death, a Festschrift on Sheps was published in Buenos Aires as part of a book series on Polish-Jewish life, featuring writings by Isaac Bashevis Singer, Avrom Reyzen, and other friends and writers.

In total, Sheps published 26 books: 13 volumes of essays comprising philosophical, scientific, artistic, and religious themes; six collections of poetry; three books of short stories and articles; two memoirs; one book of folktales in Polish; and one book of essays in Hebrew translation. He was drawn to works of, or on, Spinoza, Schopenhauer, Henri Bergson, Zionism, and Taoist and Buddhist philosophy.

Sheps was a member of the American Academy of Political and Social Science, the American Philosophical Association, and the Spinoza Institute of America. He was also a fellow at the International Institute of Arts and Letters.

In 2020, an English translation of one of Sheps' satirical short stories was published in Jewish Currents.

=== Personal life ===
In 1929, Sheps' brother mysteriously disappeared from California.

Sheps lived for a time in the Bronx with his wife, Fradl "Frida" Vaytman (Yiddish: פֿראַדל „פֿרידאַ“ װײַטמאַן). On June 12, 1938, he arrived to their home and found her dead by eithre by heart attack or suicide.

One of his former love interests, Sarah Perle, also committed suicide due to the scandal of their illicit relationship.

Sheps, who suffered from hallucinations and loneliness, himself committed suicide at his apartment on the Upper West Side on September 25, 1963. He had no surviving family.

Among his writerly friends were Isaac Bashevis Singer, Avrom Reyzen, Itzik Manger, and Morris Rosenfeld.

== Bibliography ==
=== Poetry collections (Note: For sake of brevity, publishers of works have been omitted.) ===
- Bay di randn (Yiddish: בײַ די ראַנדן, lit. 'On the Edges'), New York, 1923.
- Far di likht: Lider (Yiddish: פֿאַר די ליכט: לידער, lit. 'Before the Light: Poems'), Warsaw, 1924.
- In Elyashs kinigraykh: Humoristishe libes-lider (Yiddish: אין עליאַשס קיניגרײַך: הומאָריסטישע ליבעס־לידער, lit. 'In Elyash's Kingdom: Humorous Love Poems'), Warsaw, 1924.
- Gezang un geveyn (Yiddish: געזאַנג און געװײן, lit. 'Verse and Weeping'), New York, 1943.
- Letste gezangen (Yiddish: לעצטע געזאַנגען, lit. 'Final Verses'), Buenos Aires, 1954.
  - Shirot aharonot: Shirim u-fo'emot (Hebrew: שירות אחרונות: שירים ופואימות, lit. 'Final Verses: Songs and Poetry'), Tel Aviv, 1966. Translated into the Hebrew by Shlomo Shenhod.

=== Essay and scholarly collections ===
- Di tsveyte eksistents (Yiddish: די צװײטע עקסיסטענץ, lit. 'The Second Existence'), New York, 1921.
- Di khinezishe filozofye un poezye (Yiddish: די כינעזישע פֿילאָזאָפֿיע און פּאָעזיע, lit. 'Chinese Philosophy and Poetry'), New York, 1925.
- Oyfn veg fun di geter: Heylike shriftn un mitologishe geshikhtn fun di Egipter, Hindusn, Yapaner un Indianer (Yiddish: אױפֿן װעג פֿון די געטער: הײליקע שריפֿטן און מיטאָלאָגישע געשיכטן פֿון די עגיפּטער, הינדוסן, יאַפּאַנער און אינדיאַנער, lit. 'Along the Way of the Gods: Holy Writings and Mythological Histories of the Egyptians, Hindus, Japanese and Indians'), Warsaw, 1929.
- Literarishe nesyes (Yiddish: ליטעראַרישע נסיעות, lit. 'Literary Voyages'), Warsaw, 1931.
- Mentshn un ideyen (Yiddish: מענטשן און אידײען, lit. 'People and Ideas'), Warsaw, 1933.
- Kritik un polemik (Yiddish: קריטיק און פּאָלעמיק, lit. 'Critique and Polemics'), Warsaw, 1939.
- In gerangl fun ideyen: Eseyen (Yiddish: אין געראַנגל פֿון אידײען: עסײען, lit. 'In Conflict With Ideas: Essays'), Buenos Aires, 1957.
- Sholem Ash—a sakh-akl: Seperater opdruk fun zshurnal "Undzer veg" (Yiddish: שלום אַש—אַ שך־הכּל: סעפּעראַטער אָפּדרוק פֿון זשורנאַל „אונדזער װעג“, lit. 'Sholem Asch—A Summary: Separate Printing of the Journal "Our Way"'), Chicago, 1959.

=== Folktale collections ===
- 1863: Yidishe favstanye-mayselekh (Yiddish: 1863: ייִדישע פֿאַװסטאַניע־מעשׂהלעך, lit. '1863: Jewish Rebellion Tales'), Warsaw, 1927.
  - (Polish: Legendy żydowskie o powstaniu 1863 r., lit. 'Jewish Legends About the 1863 Uprising'), Warsaw, 1929.

=== Memoirs ===
- Momentn fun a lebn: Zikhroynes, bilder un epizodn (Yiddish: מאָמענטן פֿון אַ לעבן: זכרונות, בילדער און עפּיזאָדן, lit. 'Moments from a Life: Memories, Scenes and Episodes'), Buenos Aires, 1948.
- Kheshbn un sakh-akl: Kapitlen fun mayn Seyfer HaKhayim (zikhroynes un makhshoves) (Yiddish: חשבון און סך־הכּל: קאַפּיטלען פֿון מײַן ספֿר החײם (זכרונות און מחשבֿות), lit. 'Checks and Balances: Chapters from My Book of Life (Memories and Thoughts)'), Buenos Aires, 1958.

=== English works ===
- Eternal Frontiers, New York, 1939.
- Our Unfinished World, New York, 1947.
- My Credo, New York, 1948.
- The Strange Death of Barukh Spinoza, Cambridge, Massachusetts, 1952.

== See also ==
- Yiddish literature
