= Jardim Olinda =

City of Jardim Olinda
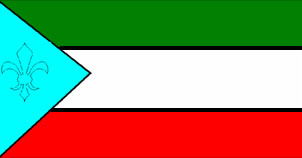
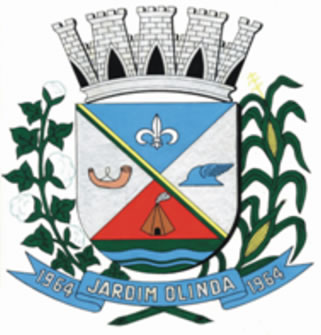
- Flag Coat of arms

- Location of Jardim Olinda
- Coordinates: 22°32′56″S 52°03′39″W
- Country: Brazil
- Region: South
- State: Paraná
- Founded: December 1, 1964

Government
  - Mayor: Fernando Jorge Siroti

Area
  - Total: 128.515 km^{2} (49.620 sq mi)

Population (2020)
  - Total: 1,320
  - Density: 10.96/km^{2} (28.4/sq mi)
- Time zone: UTC−3 (BRT)
- HDI (2000): 0.724 – medium
- Website: Ponta Grossa, Paraná

Jardim Olinda is the northernmost city in the Brazilian state of Paraná. The Saran Grande waterfall, located there, is the northernmost point in the state and in all Southern Brazil.
