= Mâncio Lima =

Municipality of Acre, Brazil

- Municipality
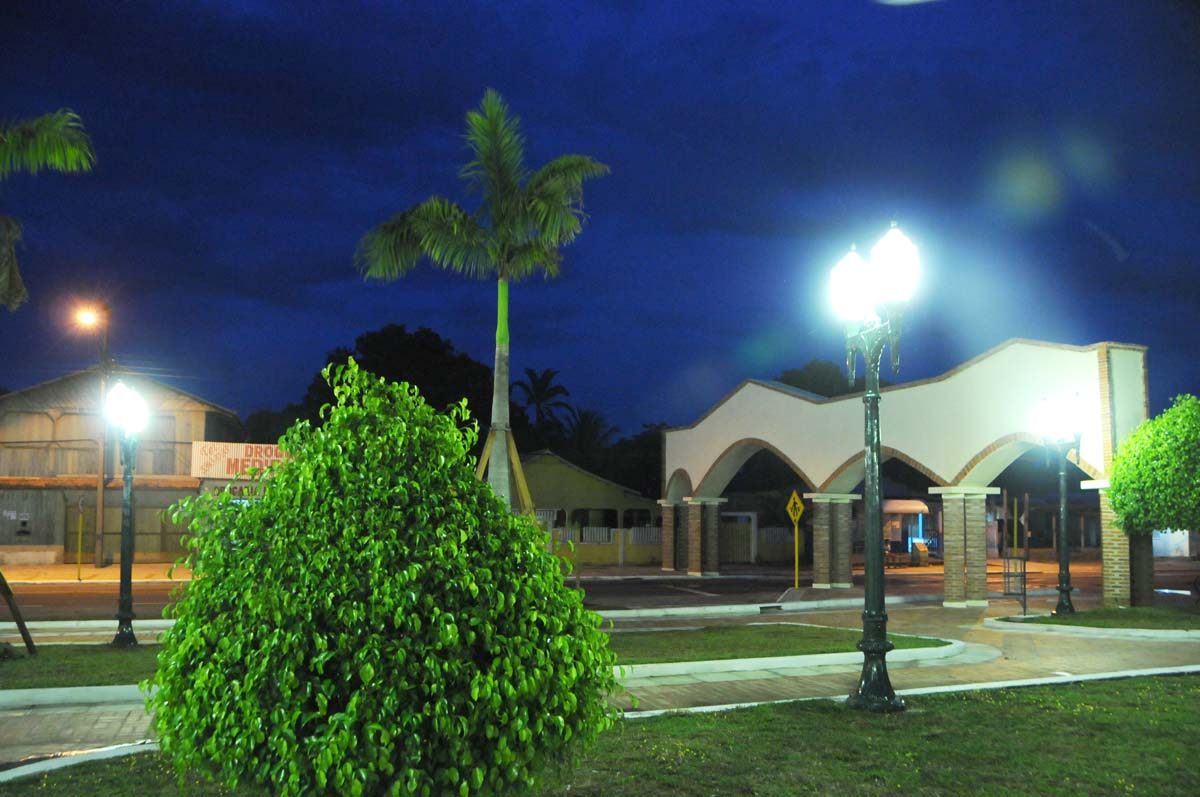

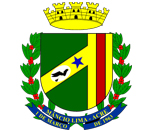
- Flag Coat of arms

- Location of municipality in Acre State

- Location in Brazil
- Coordinates: 07°36′50″S 72°53′45″W
- Country: Brazil
- State: Acre

Area
  - Total: 1,804 sq mi (4,672 km^{2})

Population (2022)
  - Total: 19,294
- Time zone: UTC−5 (ACT)

Mâncio Lima (Brazilian Portuguese pronunciation: [ˈmɐ̃sju ˈlimɐ]) is a municipality in the Brazilian state of Acre. Located deep within the Amazon rainforest, it is the country's westernmost municipality and the state's northernmost. As of 2022, it had a population of 19,294.

Mâncio Lima grew out of a small village named Vila Japiim. The population ballooned with the arrival of settlers from northeast Brazil, who sought a better livelihood in the area amid the Brazilian rubber booms of the 20th century. Vila Japiim became a municipality in 1976 and was renamed Mâncio Lima after one of the settlers who came from the northeast.

== Geography ==
Mâncio Lima is situated in the Juruá river valley within the Amazon rainforest. Covering an area of 4,672 square kilometres (1,804 sq mi), it contains 32% of the 846,633-hectare (2,092,080-acre) Serra do Divisor National Park, a protected area created in 1989. It is the westernmost municipality of Brazil and the northernmost of Acre.

It contains part of the 846,633-hectare Serra do Divisor National Park, a protected area created in 1989.

== History ==
Mâncio Lima emerged from a village named Vila Japiim. During the rubber booms of the 20th century, a large number of migrants arrived from northeast Brazil, predominantly from the state of Ceará, and settled as rubber tappers or farmers. Vila Japiim was consequently elevated to the status of a municipality on 30 May 1976 and renamed Mâncio Lima, after Mâncio Agostinho Rodrigues de Lima, a pioneer from Ceará.

== Demographics ==
The 2022 census recorded a population of 19,294 in Mâncio Lima. The local population includes a number of Indigenous peoples such as the Poyanawa, as well as the descendants of rubber tappers who immigrated from the northeast during the rubber booms.

== Economy ==
The economy of Mâncio Lima is based primarily on agriculture, with cassava and coffee being the main crops. In recent years, the municipality has seen growth in tourism, especially ecotourism, due to its location within Serra do Divisor National Park.
