= List of longest beaches =

This is a list of the longest beaches. Due to the Coastline paradox, measuring the longest beach exactly is incredibly complicated, and nearly impossible to verify because of the constant changes of shape in the beach, and complexity of picking the corresponding units of measure through cartographic generalization.

== Candidates for longest beaches ==
Longest beaches
Beach	Country	Continent	Record	Length	References
Praia do Cassino	Brazil	South America	Longest uninterrupted sandy seashore in the world (disputed; see coastline paradox)	212–254 kilometres (132–158 mi)	
Eighty Mile Beach	Australia	Oceania	Contender for the longest uninterrupted sandy seashore in the world (disputed; see coastline paradox)	230 kilometres (140 mi)	
Cox's Bazar Beach	Bangladesh	Asia		120 kilometres (75 mi)	
Padre Island National Seashore	United States	North America	Longest undeveloped barrier island in the world	105.4 kilometres (65.5 mi)	
Ninety Mile Beach, New Zealand	New Zealand	Oceania		88 kilometres (55 mi)	
Troia Peninsula	Portugal	Europe	Longest uninterrupted sand beach in Europe	64.8 kilometres (42 mil)	

== Coastline paradox ==
The coastline paradox is the counterintuitive observation that the coastline of a landmass does not have a well-defined length or perimeter. This results from the fractal curve–like properties of coastlines, namely the fact that a coastline typically has a fractal dimension. Although the "paradox of length" was previously noted by Hugo Steinhaus, the first systematic study of this phenomenon was by Lewis Fry Richardson, and it was expanded upon by Benoit Mandelbrot.

The measured length of the coastline depends on the method used to measure it and the degree of cartographic generalization. Since a landmass has features at all scales, from hundreds of kilometers in size to tiny fractions of a millimeter and below, there is no obvious size of the smallest feature that should be taken into consideration when measuring, and hence no single well-defined perimeter to the landmass. Various approximations, such as the Minkowski–Bouligand dimension, exist when specific assumptions are made about minimum feature size.

The problem is fundamentally different from the measurement of other, simpler edges. It is possible, for example, to accurately measure the length of a straight, idealized metal bar by using a measurement device to determine that the length is less than a certain amount and greater than another amount—that is, to measure it within a certain degree of uncertainty. The more precise the measurement device, the closer the results will be to the true length of the edge. With a coastline, however, measuring in finer and finer detail does not improve the accuracy; it merely adds to the total. Unlike with the metal bar, it is impossible even in theory to obtain an exact value for the length of a coastline.

In three-dimensional space, the coastline paradox is readily extended to the concept of fractal surface structures, whereby the area of a surface varies depending on the measurement resolution.
