= Transition region =

Transition region may refer to:

- Solar transition region
- Filter transition region
