= Summer of the Cans =

1987–1988 event in Brazil

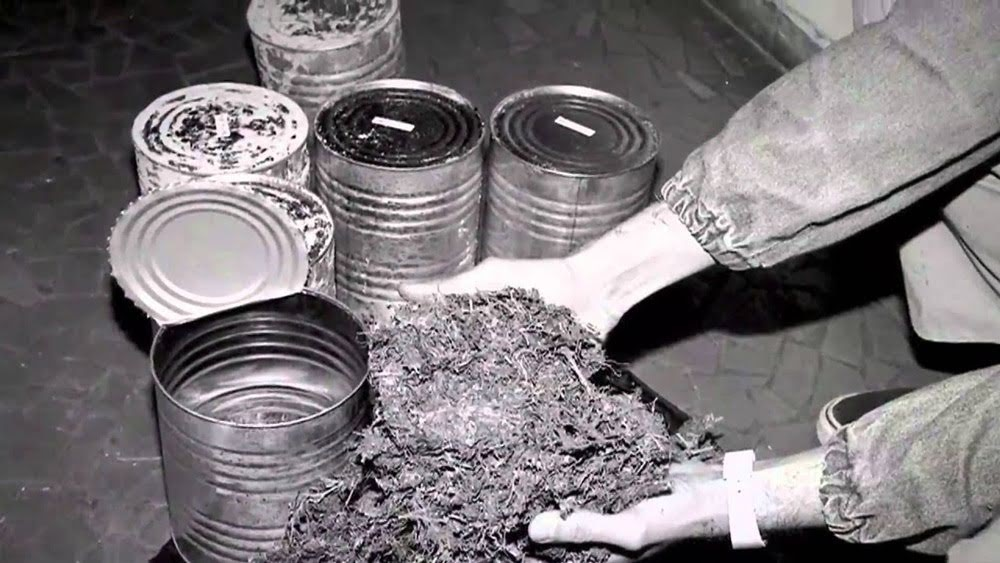
Cans containing marijuana

The summer of the cans (Portuguese: verão da lata) was an event that took place on the Brazilian coast from September 1987 to 1988 in which thousands of sealed cans containing cannabis washed ashore on the beaches of Brazil, from Cabo Frio to Praia do Cassino. In September 1987, crew members of the Solana Star drug trafficking ship, which was heading toward the United States, had dumped 13,000 cans containing an estimated total of 22 tons of marijuana near the coast of Brazil.

== Incident ==
=== First reports ===
The first report of the floating marijuana-filled cans occurred on September 25, 1987, from fishermen off the coast of Maricá, Rio de Janeiro. They had seen the silver objects floating in the water, and after checking the contents of 18 cans, they were surprised to find about 1.5 kg of marijuana in each can. The fishermen took the drugs to the Rio de Janeiro military police. Upon finding reports of the cans from several cities, the Federal Police of Brazil became involved. It was discovered that the cannabis contained in the cans was significantly stronger than cannabis being illegally distributed nationwide.

=== Race for the cans ===
As news of the incident spread, Brazilians traveled to the coast in an attempt to retrieve a can containing marijuana, mainly between the states of São Paulo and Rio Grande do Sul. The beaches, already crowded with the arrival of summer, became busy with marijuana can searchers. Police soon shut down beaches and swarmed them both to arrest people taking the cans, and to search for cans and remove them.

In 2019, BBC radio interviewed a Brazilian who called it a "huge frenzy" and noted that it happened in the summer, when marijuana was typically in short supply in Rio de Janeiro. The cannabis was consumed during Brazilian Carnival in the spring of 1988. The 1986 song "A Novidade" by Paralamas do Sucesso became an unofficial theme song of the summer.

== Police action ==
Marijuana consumption was illegal in Brazil and could result in convictions of one to five years in prison. Police struggled to identify real cans containing marijuana from similar-looking cans, which were sold as decorative accessories. In this confusion of cans, some people were able to successfully leave the coast with cans of marijuana.

=== Arrests and police retrievals ===
Police spent months tracking down missing marijuana cans along Brazil's coast, but records indicate that military police only recovered about 3,000 of the 13,000 cans that were dumped into the water. Police concluded that these approximately 10,000 missing cans were either found by civilians, rescued by the drug traffickers, lost at sea or sunken, or had floated to other countries.

The cans were found in the following states:

State	Number of Cans	Kg of Marijuana
Rio Grande do Sul	9	+- 13.5 kg
Rio de Janeiro	799	+- 1038.7 kg
São Paulo	1735	+- 2,602.5 kg
Total	2,543	+- 3,654.7 kg

The states of Santa Catarina and Paraná did not disclose the number of cans seized by their respective military police forces.

== Solana Star ship ==
After weeks of mystery, the source for the cans was revealed to be the Solana Star ship. After a confrontation with other drug traffickers, the ship's seven-member crew began dumping the marijuana cargo into the ocean and damaging the boat due to a fear of arrest. The ship then went to the coast of Brazil for repairs.

The US Drug Enforcement Administration had been monitoring the Solana Star vessel due to suspicions of marijuana trafficking, and alerted Brazilian authorities when the ship appeared to make an unusual stop near Brazil. The ship was registered in Panama, and was traveling from Australia toward Miami, Florida, with stops in Southeast Asia.

When authorities eventually raided the Solana Star, the only crewman on board was Stephen Skelton, an American who was the ship's cook. He was taken into custody, and spent a year in prison before being extradited to his country. Skelton was questioned by police, and reported that there were about 13,000 cans each containing 1 to 1.5 kg of marijuana.

== Legacy ==
Summer of the Can has inspired songs, and remains a part of the culture of Brazil. An album and song by Fernanda Abreu, De Lata, references the summer. The term da lata (meaning "of the cans") became Brazilian slang meaning high quality or good. A 2014 documentary Verão da Lata.

=== Effect on national drug trade ===
Because canned marijuana was higher quality than that sold by the Brazilian drug dealers, demand fell for the national drug trade. Additionally, outsiders entered the market to resell canned marijuana. Brazilian drug traffickers adapted by improving their production techniques to increase quality, a shift that strengthened Brazil's cannabis trade.
