= Half-band filter =

Type of low-pass filter

A half-band filter is a finite impulse response (FIR) low-pass filter that reduces the maximum bandwidth of sampled data by a factor of 2 (one octave). When multiple octaves of reduction are needed, a cascade of half-band filters is common. And when the goal is downsampling, each half-band filter needs to compute only half as many output samples as input samples. In digital signal processing, half-band filters are widely used for their efficiency in multi-rate applications.

It follows from the filter's definition that its transition region, or skirt, can be centered at frequency $f_s/4,$ where $f_s$ is the input sample-rate. That makes it possible to design a FIR filter whose every other coefficient is zero, and whose non-zero coefficients are symmetrical about the center of the impulse response. (See Finite impulse response § Window design method) Both of those properties can be used to improve efficiency of the implementation.
