= List of U.S. states and territories by coastline =

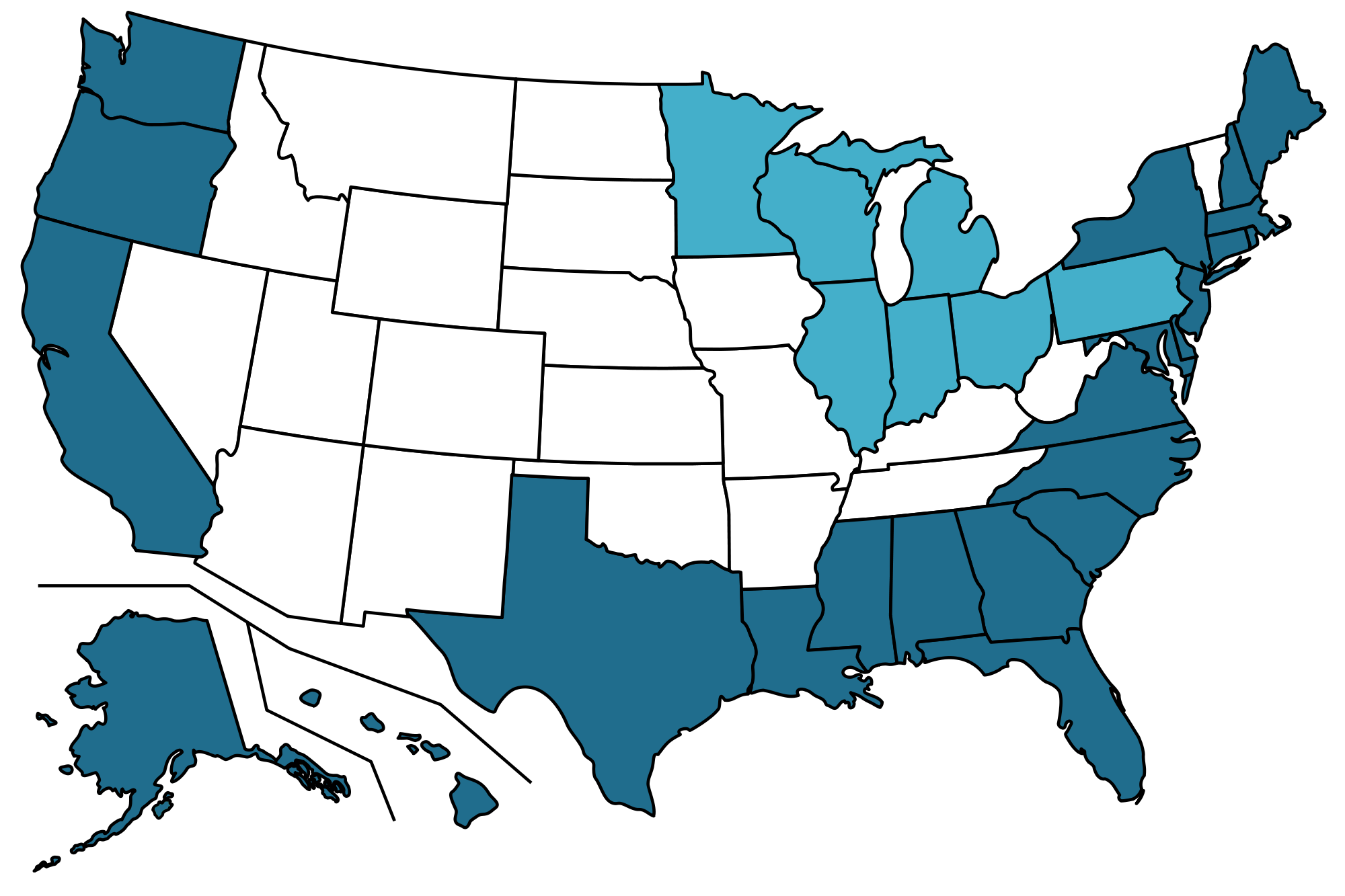
States shaded dark blue have ocean coastline.* States shaded light blue have Great Lakes coastline.* States shaded white have no coastline. * New York has both ocean and Great Lakes coastline.

This is a list of U.S. states and territories ranked by their coastline length. 30 states have a coastline: 23 with a coastline on the Arctic Ocean, Atlantic Ocean (including the Gulf of Mexico and Gulf of Maine), and/or Pacific Ocean, and 8 with a Great Lakes shoreline. New York has coasts on both the Great Lakes and the Atlantic Ocean. Smaller border lakes, such as Lake Champlain and Lake of the Woods, are not counted. All of the five major U.S. territories have coastlines: three of them have a coastline on the Pacific Ocean, and two of them have a coastline on the Atlantic Ocean (Caribbean Sea). The U.S. Minor Outlying Islands also have coastlines.

Two separate measurements are used: method 1 only includes states with ocean coastline and excludes tidal inlets; method 2 includes Great Lake shoreline and the extra length from tidal inlets. For example, method 2 counts the Great Bay as part of New Hampshire's coastline, but method 1 does not. Method 1 does not include the coastlines of the territories of the United States, and method 2 does.

The data for method 1 are from a CRS Report for Congress using data from U.S. Department of Commerce, National Oceanic and Atmospheric Administration, The Coastline of the United States, 1975. This is based on measurements made using large-scale nautical charts. The figure for Connecticut was arrived at separately and may not reflect the correct comparative distance.

The data for method 2 are from a list maintained by the Office of Ocean and Coastal Resource Management of NOAA. (Note: The data for the U.S. Minor Outlying Islands is from the CIA World Factbook.) The state coastline lengths were computed by an unspecified method that includes tidal areas not included in the first method. These numbers also include the Great Lakes coastlines, which do not have similar tidal areas. Data for the U.S. Minor Outlying Islands is from the CIA World Factbook.

The figures also face the ambiguity inherent in all attempts at measuring coastlines, as expressed in the coastline paradox.

== Table ==
State or territory	Method 1 (CRS)		Method 2 (NOAA)		Ratio (M2÷M1)	Area (mi^{2})	Coast/area ratio (ft/mi^{2})	
State or territory	Coastline	Rank	Coastline	Rank	Ratio (M2÷M1)	Area (mi^{2})	Method 1	Method 2
Alaska	6,640 mi (10,690 km)	1	33,904 mi (54,563 km)	1	5.11	665,384	53	270
Florida	1,350 mi (2,170 km)	2	8,436 mi (13,576 km)	2	6.25	65,758	110	680
California	840 mi (1,350 km)	3	3,427 mi (5,515 km)	5	4.08	163,695	27	110
Hawaii	750 mi (1,210 km)	4	1,052 mi (1,693 km)	18	1.40	10,932	360	510
Louisiana	397 mi (639 km)	5	7,721 mi (12,426 km)	3	19.4	52,378	40	780
Texas	367 mi (591 km)	6	3,359 mi (5,406 km)	7	9.15	268,596	7.2	66
North Carolina	301 mi (484 km)	7	3,375 mi (5,432 km)	6	11.2	53,819	30	330
Oregon	296 mi (476 km)	8	1,410 mi (2,270 km)	17	4.76	98,379	16	76
Maine	228 mi (367 km)	9	3,478 mi (5,597 km)	4	15.3	35,380	34	520
Massachusetts	192 mi (309 km)	10	1,519 mi (2,445 km)	16	7.91	10,554	96	760
South Carolina	187 mi (301 km)	11	2,876 mi (4,628 km)	12	15.4	32,020	31	470
Washington	157 mi (253 km)	12	3,026 mi (4,870 km)	11	19.3	71,298	12	220
New Jersey	130 mi (210 km)	13	1,792 mi (2,884 km)	15	13.8	8,723	79	1,100
New York	127 mi (204 km)	14	2,625 mi (4,225 km)	13	20.7	54,555	12	250
Virginia	112 mi (180 km)	15	3,315 mi (5,335 km)	8	29.6	42,775	14	410
Georgia	100 mi (160 km)	16	2,344 mi (3,772 km)	14	23.4	59,425	8.9	210
Connecticut	96 mi (154 km)	17	618 mi (995 km)	21	6.44	5,543	91	590
Alabama	53 mi (85 km)	18	607 mi (977 km)	22	11.5	52,420	5.3	61
Mississippi	44 mi (71 km)	19	359 mi (578 km)	25	8.16	48,432	4.8	39
Rhode Island	40 mi (64 km)	20	384 mi (618 km)	23	9.60	1,545	140	1,300
Maryland	31 mi (50 km)	21	3,190 mi (5,130 km)	10	103	12,406	13	1,400
Delaware	28 mi (45 km)	22	381 mi (613 km)	24	13.6	2,489	59	810
New Hampshire	13 mi (21 km)	23	131 mi (211 km)	31	10.1	9,349	7.3	74
Michigan	–	–	3,224 mi (5,189 km)	9	–	96,714	–	180
Wisconsin	–	–	820 mi (1,320 km)	19	–	65,496	–	66
Ohio	–	–	312 mi (502 km)	26	–	44,826	–	37
Minnesota	–	–	189 mi (304 km)	28	–	86,936	–	11
Pennsylvania	–	–	140 mi (230 km)	30	–	46,054	–	16
Illinois	–	–	63 mi (101 km)	35	–	57,914	–	5.7
Indiana	–	–	45 mi (72 km)	36	–	36,420	–	6.5
American Samoa	–	–	126 mi (203 km)	32	–	–	–	–
Guam	–	–	110 mi (180 km)	33	–	–	–	–
Northern Mariana Islands	–	–	206 mi (332 km)	27	–	–	–	–
Puerto Rico	–	–	700 mi (1,100 km)	20	–	–	–	–
U.S. Virgin Islands	–	–	175 mi (282 km)	29	–	–	–	–
(United States) U.S. Minor Outlying Islands	—	—	70.21 mi (112.99 km)	34	—	—	—	—
Total	12,479 mi (20,083 km)		95,509 mi (153,707 km) (Note: Figure is the "95,439 miles" number stated by the NOAA, plus the 70 miles of coastline of the U.S. Minor Outlying Islands.)					

== See also ==
- Coastline paradox
- List of countries by length of coastline
- How Long Is the Coast of Britain? Statistical Self-Similarity and Fractional Dimension
