= List of countries and dependencies by length of coastline =

This article contains a list of countries and dependencies by length of coastline, in kilometers. Though the coastline paradox stipulates that coastlines do not have a well-defined length, there are various methods in use to measure coastlines through ratios and other metrics. A coastline of zero indicates that the country is landlocked.

== Coastline paradox ==
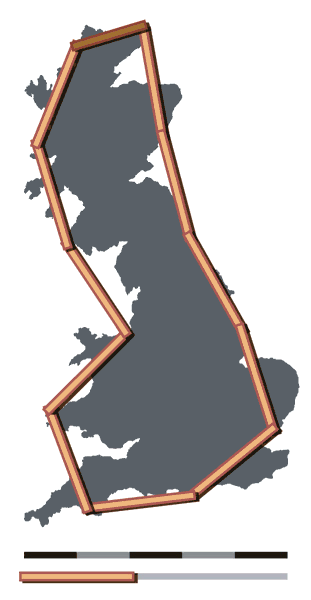
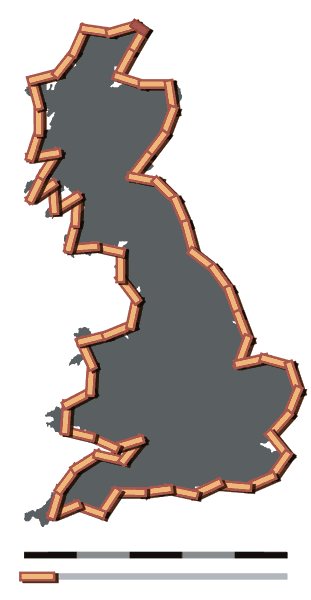
An example of the coastline paradox. If measured using an interval of 125 mi (200 km), the coast of Great Britain has a length of about 1,500 mi (2,400 km). Using an interval of 30 mi (50 km), the length is about 2,100 mi (3,400 km).

The coastline paradox states that a coastline does not have a well-defined length. Measurements of the length of a coastline behave like a fractal, being different at different scale intervals (distance between points on the coastline at which measurements are taken). The smaller the scale interval (meaning the more detailed the measurement), the longer the coastline will be. (Note: The smaller the scale interval mathematically, the more detailed and the "greater the scale of the map", in common usage. See scale (map).) This "magnifying" effect is greater for convoluted coastlines than for relatively smooth ones.

== Data sources ==
Data marked The World Factbook or TWF is derived from the book published by the Central Intelligence Agency and covers 198 countries and 55 territories. Note that the scales at which The World Factbook figures were measured are not stated, nor is it known whether the figures are all reported using the same scale, thus the figures are necessarily not comparable across different countries.

Data marked World Resources Institute or WRI covers 182 independent countries and 13 dependencies, based on data calculated in 2000 from the World Vector Shoreline, United States Defense Mapping Agency, 1989. It may include territories whose status have changed. According to their technical notes,

"Coastline length was derived from the World Vector Shoreline database at 1:250,000 scale. The estimates (...) were calculated using a Geographic Information System (GIS) and an underlying database consistent for the entire world. The methodology used to estimate length is based on the following: 1) A country's coastline is made up of individual lines, and an individual line has two or more vertices and/or nodes. 2) The length between two vertices is calculated on the surface of a sphere. 3) The sum of the lengths of the pairs of vertices is aggregated for each individual line, and 4) the sum of the lengths of individual lines was aggregated for a country. In general, the coastline length of islands that are part of a country, but are not overseas territories, are included in the coastline estimate for that country (e.g., Canary Islands are included in Spain). Coastline length for overseas territories and dependencies are listed separately. Disputed areas are not included in country or regional totals."

In addition to coastline lengths, The World Factbook is the source of the land area used to calculate the "coast/area ratio" for both coastline measurements. This ratio measures how many metres of coastline correspond to every square kilometer of land area. The ratio illustrates the ease of accessibility to the country's coast from every point in its interior. Therefore, an island country like Maldives, or a country carved by the sea like Greece, is more likely to have a high ratio, while a landlocked country will have a ratio of zero.

== List ==
Data are from the World Resources Institute. Non-sovereign areas are listed in italics. and the CIA World Factbook. Notes refer to the CIA World Factbook measurements. It is important to note that unlike the CIA World Factbook, the WRI measurements use the same measurement scale for all countries.

Location	Coastline (km)		Land area (km^{2})	Coast/area ratio (m/km^{2})		Notes
Location	(WRI)	(CIA)	Land area (km^{2})	(WRI)	(CIA)	Notes
World	1,634,701	356,000	148,940,000	11.0	2.39	World total includes countries not listed and coastline for disputed areas.
Canada	265,523	202,080	9,093,507	29.2	22.2	
United States	133,312	19,924	9,147,593	14.6	2.18	
Russia	110,310	37,653	16,377,742	6.74	2.30	Russia has an additional 850 km of coastline along the Caspian Sea, which is landlocked.
Indonesia	95,181	54,716	1,811,569	52.5	30.2	
Chile	78,563	6,435	743,812	106	8.65	
Australia	66,530	25,760	7,682,300	8.66	3.35	
Norway	53,199	83,281	304,282	175	274	Includes coastline of outlying islands.
Philippines	33,900	36,289	298,170	114	122	
Brazil	33,379	7,491	8,358,140	3.99	0.896	
Finland	31,119	1,250	303,815	102	4.11	
China	30,017	14,500	9,326,410	3.22	1.55	
Japan	29,020	29,751	364,485	79.6	81.6	
Sweden	26,384	3,218	410,335	64.3	7.84	
Mexico	23,761	9,330	1,943,945	12.2	4.80	
Papua New Guinea	20,197	5,152	452,860	44.6	11.4	
United Kingdom	19,717	12,429	241,930	81.5	51.4	
New Zealand	17,209	15,134	264,537	65.1	57.2	
India	17,181	11,098	3,287,263	5.78	2.35	
Greece	15,147	13,676	130,647	116	105	Includes coastline of outlying islands.
Myanmar	14,708	1,930	653,508	22.5	2.95	
Cuba	14,519	3,735	109,820	132	34.0	
South Korea	12,478	2,413	96,920	129	24.9	
Vietnam	11,409	3,444	310,070	36.8	11.1	Excludes minor outlying islands.
Bahamas	11,238	3,542	10,010	1,120	354	
Madagascar	9,935	4,828	581,540	17.1	8.30	
Solomon Islands	9,880	5,313	27,986	353	190	
Malaysia	9,323	4,675	328,657	28.4	14.2	
Italy	9,226	7,600	294,140	31.4	25.8	
Iceland	8,506	4,970	100,250	84.8	49.6	
Argentina	8,397	4,989	2,736,690	3.07	1.82	
Turkey	8,140	7,200	769,632	10.6	9.36	
Saudi Arabia	7,572	2,640	2,149,690	3.52	1.23	
France	7,330	4,853	640,427	11.4	7.58	
Spain	7,268	4,964	498,980	14.6	9.95	Includes coastline length for the Canary Islands.
Thailand	7,066	3,219	510,890	13.8	6.30	
Mozambique	6,942	2,470	786,380	8.83	3.14	
Venezuela	6,762	2,800	882,050	7.67	3.17	
Ireland	6,437	1,448	68,883	93.4	21.0	
Egypt	5,898	2,450	995,450	5.92	2.46	
Iran	5,891	2,440	1,648,195	3.85	1.59	Includes coastline of outlying islands. Iran has an additional 740 km of coastline along the Caspian Sea, which is landlocked.
Colombia	5,875	3,208	1,038,700	5.66	3.09	
French Polynesia (France)	5,830	2,525	3,827	1,520	660	
Croatia	5,664	5,835	55,974	101	112	Includes coastline of outlying islands.
Panama	5,637	2,490	74,340	75.8	33.5	
Denmark	5,316	7,314	42,434	217	179	
Ukraine	4,953	2,782	603,628	8.55	4.80	
Fiji	4,638	1,129	18,274	254	61.8	
Ecuador	4,597	2,237	276,841	16.6	8.08	
Kazakhstan	4,528	0	2,699,700	1.68	0	Kazakhstan has a coastline with the Caspian Sea, which is landlocked, with a total length of 1,894 km.
North Korea	4,009	2,495	120,408	33.3	20.7	
Somalia	3,898	3,333	627,337	6.21	4.82	
South Africa	3,751	2,798	1,214,470	3.09	2.30	
Germany	3,624	2,389	348,672	10.4	6.85	
New Caledonia (France)	3,624	2,254	18,275	198	123	
Tanzania	3,461	1,424	885,800	3.91	1.61	
Eritrea	3,446	2,234	101,000	34.1	22.1	Includes coastline of outlying islands.
Peru	3,362	2,414	1,279,996	2.63	1.89	
Bangladesh	3,306	580	148,470	25.4	4.46	
Guinea-Bissau	3,176	350	28,120	113	12.4	
Yemen	3,149	1,906	527,968	5.96	3.61	
Vanuatu	3,132	2,528	12,189	257	207	
Nigeria	3,122	853	910,768	3.43	0.937	
Estonia	2,956	3,794	42,388	69.7	89.5	
United Arab Emirates	2,871	1,318	83,600	34.3	15.8	
Portugal	2,830	1,793	91,470	30.9	19.6	
Sri Lanka	2,825	1,340	64,630	43.7	20.7	
Oman	2,810	2,092	309,500	9.08	6.76	
Pakistan	2,599	1,046	770,875	3.37	1.36	
Angola	2,252	1,600	1,246,700	1.81	1.28	
Sudan	2,245	853	1,731,671	1.30	0.493	
Marshall Islands	2,106	370.4	181	11,600	2,050	
Costa Rica	2,069	1,290	51,060	40.5	25.3	
Libya	2,025	1,770	1,759,540	1.15	1.01	
Gabon	2,019	885	257,667	7.84	3.43	
Morocco	2,009	2,945	716,550	2.80	2.56	
Taiwan	2,007	1,566.3	32,260	62.2	48.6	
Maldives	2,002	644	298	6,720	2,160	
Belize	1,996	386	22,806	87.5	16.9	
Haiti	1,977	1,771	27,560	71.7	64.3	
Kiribati	1,961	1,143	811	2,420	1,410	
Tunisia	1,927	1,148	155,360	12.4	7.39	
Nicaragua	1,915	910	119,990	16.0	7.58	
Netherlands	1,914	451	33,893	56.5	13.3	In 1900, the Dutch coastline measured approximately 1400 km. It has significantly been reduced by the closing of the Zuiderzee by the Afsluitdijk in 1932 (250 km) and the closing of several sea arms by the Delta Works (700 km).
Honduras	1,878	832	111,890	16.8	7.44	Includes coastline in the Gulf of Fonseca (163 km).
Cameroon	1,799	402	472,710	3.81	0.850	
Namibia	1,754	1,572	823,290	2.13	1.91	
Uzbekistan	1,707	0	425,400	4.01	0	
Sierra Leone	1,677	402	71,620	23.4	5.61	
Guinea	1,615	320	245,717	6.57	1.30	
Dominican Republic	1,612	1,288	48,320	33.4	26.7	
Kenya	1,586	536	569,140	2.79	0.942	
Algeria	1,557	998	2,381,740	0.654	0.419	
Senegal	1,327	531	192,530	6.89	2.76	
Micronesia	1,295	6,112	702	1,840	8,710	
Turkmenistan	1,289	0	469,930	2.74	0	Turkmenistan has a coastline with the Caspian Sea, which is landlocked, with a total length of 1,768 km.
Mauritania	1,268	754	1,030,700	1.23	0.732	
Guyana	1,154	459	196,849	5.86	2.33	
Cambodia	1,127	443	176,515	6.38	2.51	
Cape Verde	1,121	965	4,033	278	239	
Uruguay	1,096	660	175,015	6.26	3.77	
Puerto Rico (United States)	1,094	501	8,959	122	55.9	
Poland	1,032	440	304,255	3.39	1.45	
Hong Kong (China)	955	733	1,073	890	683	
Qatar	909	563	11,586	78.5	48.6	
Tonga	909	419	717	1,270	584	
Jamaica	895	1,022	10,831	82.6	94.4	
Azerbaijan	871	0	82,629	10.5	0	Azerbaijan has a 713-km coastline along the Caspian Sea, which is landlocked.
Liberia	842	579	96,320	8.74	6.01	
Ivory Coast	797	515	318,003	2.51	1.62	
French Guiana (France)	763					
Ghana	758	539	227,533	3.33	2.37	
Kuwait	756	499	17,818	42.4	28.0	
El Salvador	756	307	20,721	36.5	14.8	
Seychelles	747	491	455	1,640	1,080	
Trinidad and Tobago	704	362	5,128	137	70.6	
Romania	696	225	229,891	3.03	0.979	
Cyprus	671	648	9,241	72.6	70.1	
Albania	649	362	27,398	23.7	13.2	
Suriname	620	386	156,000	3.97	2.47	
Equatorial Guinea	603	296	28,051	21.5	10.6	
Guadeloupe (France)	581					
Latvia	566	498	62,249	9.09	8.00	
Gambia	503	80	10,120	49.7	7.91	
Mauritius	496	177	2,030	244	87.2	
Comoros	469	340	2,235	210	152	
Samoa	463	403	2,821	164	143	
Bulgaria	457	354	108,489	4.21	3.26	
Guatemala	445	400	107,159	4.15	3.73	
Djibouti	443	314	23,180	19.1	13.5	
U.S. Virgin Islands (United States)	390	188	346	1,130	543	
Georgia	376	310	69,700	5.39	4.45	
Martinique (France)	369					
Caribbean Netherlands (Netherlands)	361					
Lebanon	294	225	10,230	28.7	22.0	
Antigua and Barbuda	289	153	442.6	653	346	
São Tomé and Príncipe	269	209	964	279	217	
Brunei	269	161	5,265	51.1	30.6	
Singapore	268	193	709.2	378	272	
Saint Vincent and the Grenadines	264	84	389	679	216	
Lithuania	258	90	62,680	4.12	1.44	
Bahrain	255	161	760	336	212	
Grenada	252	121	344	733	352	
Réunion (France)	219					
Syria	212	193	185,887	1.14	1.04	
Israel	205	273	21,497	9.54	12.7	Israel has an additional coastline along the Dead Sea and the Sea of Galilee (both landlocked), with a total length of 63 km.
Congo, Republic of the	205	169	341,500	0.600	0.495	
Malta	198	252.8	316	627	800	
Bermuda (United Kingdom)	180	103	54	3,330	1,910	
Congo, Democratic Republic of the	177	37	2,267,048	0.0781	0.0163	
Saint Lucia	166	158	606	274	261	
Benin	153	121	110,622	1.38	1.09	
Dominica	152	148	751	202	197	
Aruba (Netherlands)	107	68.5	180	594	381	
Iraq	105	58	437,367	0.240	0.133	
Barbados	97	97	430	226	226	
Belgium	76	66.5	30,278	2.51	2.20	
Togo	53	56	54,385	0.975	1.03	
Slovenia	41	46.6	20,151	2.03	2.31	
Macau (China)	36	41	28.2	1,280	1,450	
Jordan	27	26	88,802	0.304	0.293	Jordan has an additional 50 km of coastline along the Dead Sea, which is landlocked.
Bosnia and Herzegovina	23	20	51,187	0.449	0.391	
Afghanistan	0	0	652,230	0	0	
Armenia	0	0	28,203	0	0	
Austria	0	0	82,445	0	0	
Belarus	0	0	202,900	0	0	
Bhutan	0	0	38,394	0	0	
Bolivia	0	0	1,083,301	0	0	
Botswana	0	0	566,730	0	0	
Burkina Faso	0	0	273,800	0	0	
Burundi	0	0	25,680	0	0	
Central African Republic	0	0	622,984	0	0	
Chad	0	0	1,259,200	0	0	
Czech Republic	0	0	77,247	0	0	
Ethiopia	0	0	1,096,570	0	0	
Hungary	0	0	89,608	0	0	
Kyrgyzstan	0	0	191,801	0	0	
Laos	0	0	230,800	0	0	
Lesotho	0	0	30,355	0	0	
Luxembourg	0	0	2,586	0	0	
Malawi	0	0	94,080	0	0	
Mali	0	0	1,220,190	0	0	
Moldova	0	0	32,891	0	0	
Mongolia	0	0	1,553,556	0	0	
Nepal	0	0	143,351	0	0	
Niger	0	0	1,266,700	0	0	
North Macedonia	0	0	25,433	0	0	
Paraguay	0	0	397,302	0	0	
Rwanda	0	0	24,668	0	0	
Slovakia	0	0	48,105	0	0	
Swaziland	0	0	17,204	0	0	
Switzerland	0	0	39,997	0	0	
Tajikistan	0	0	141,510	0	0	
Uganda	0	0	197,100	0	0	
Zambia	0	0	743,398	0	0	
Zimbabwe	0	0	386,847	0	0	
European Union		53,563	4,236,351		12.6	The European Union is included because it has certain attributes associated with independent countries. However, the EU is not a federation in the strict sense.
Greenland (Denmark)		44,087	2,166,086		20.4	
Antarctica (Disputed)		17,968	14,200,000		1.27	
Svalbard (Norway)		3,587	62,045		57.8	
Coral Sea Islands (Australia)		3,095	<3		>1,000,000	
French Southern and Antarctic Lands (France)		2,948.4	7,667.6		385	Does not include Saint Paul Island and the Crozet Islands (data unavailable) or the Adélie Land claim to Antarctica.
Palau		1,519	459		3,310	
Northern Mariana Islands (United States)		1,482	464		3,190	
Falkland Islands (United Kingdom)		1,288	12,173		106	
Faroe Islands (Denmark)		1,117	1,393		802	
Spratly Islands (Disputed)		926	<5		>200,000	
Timor-Leste		706	14,874		47.5	
British Indian Ocean Territory (United Kingdom)		698	60		11,600	
Paracel Islands (Disputed)		518	7.75		66,800	
Turks and Caicos Islands (United Kingdom)		389	948		410	
Curaçao (Netherlands)		364	444		820	
Montenegro		293.5	13,452		21.82	
Cayman Islands (United Kingdom)		160	264		606	
Isle of Man (United Kingdom)		160	572		280	
Christmas Island (Australia)		138.9	135		1,030	
Saint Kitts and Nevis		135	261		517	
Wallis and Futuna (France)		129	142		908	
Guam (United States)		125.5	544		231	
Jan Mayen (Norway)		124.1	377		329	
Cook Islands (New Zealand)		120	236		508	
Saint Pierre and Miquelon (France)		120	242		496	
American Samoa (United States)		116	224		518	
Heard Island and McDonald Islands (Australia)		101.9	412		247	
Tokelau (New Zealand)		101	12		8,420	
Saint Helena, Ascension and Tristan da Cunha (United Kingdom)		94	394		239	Excluding Ascension Island (data unavailable).
United States Pacific Island Wildlife Refuges (United States)		85.7	22.41		3,820	Includes Baker Island, Howland Island, Jarvis Island, Johnston Atoll, Kingman Reef, Midway Atoll, and Palmyra Atoll.
Akrotiri and Dhekelia (United Kingdom)		83.8	253.8		330	Figure represents total area rather than land area.
British Virgin Islands (United Kingdom)		80	151		530	
Ashmore and Cartier Islands (Australia)		74.1	5		14,800	
Jersey (United Kingdom)		70	116		603	
Niue (New Zealand)		64	260		246	
Anguilla (United Kingdom)		61	91		670	
Saint Martin (Netherlands)		58.9	54.4		1,080	Figure represents the coastline of the entire island, including Sint Maarten (administered by the Netherlands).
Pitcairn Islands (United Kingdom)		51	47		1,090	
Guernsey (United Kingdom)		50	78		641	
Gaza Strip (Palestine)		40	360		111	
Montserrat (United Kingdom)		40	102		392	
Norfolk Island (Australia)		32	36		889	
Nauru		30	21		1,430	
Bouvet Island (Norway)		29.6	49		604	
Cocos (Keeling) Islands (Australia)		26	14		1,860	
Tuvalu		24	26		923	
Wake Island (United States)		19.3	6.5		2,970	
Gibraltar (United Kingdom)		12	6.5		1,850	
Clipperton Island (France)		11.1	6		1,850	
Navassa Island (Disputed)		8	5.4		1,480	
Monaco		4.1	2		2,050	
Saint Barthélemy (France)		NA	25			
Sint Maarten (Netherlands)		NA	34		0.0147	Coastline included in figure for Saint Martin (administered by France).
South Georgia and the South Sandwich Islands (United Kingdom)		NA	3,903		0.000128	
West Bank (Palestine)		0	5,640		0	The West Bank has a 40-km coastline along the Dead Sea, which is landlocked.
Andorra		0	468		0	
Kosovo		0	10,887		0	
Liechtenstein		0	160		0	
San Marino		0	61		0	
Serbia		0	77,474		0	
South Sudan		0	644,329		0	Figure represents total area rather than land area.
Vatican City		0	0.44		0	

== See also ==
- Coastal India
- Coastline of Brazil
- Coastline of China
- Coastline of Malta
- Coastline of New Zealand
- Coastline of the United Kingdom
- Coastline of Western Australia
- List of countries bordering on two or more oceans
- List of U.S. states by coastline
