= Praia do Cassino =

Beach in Brazil

- Beach
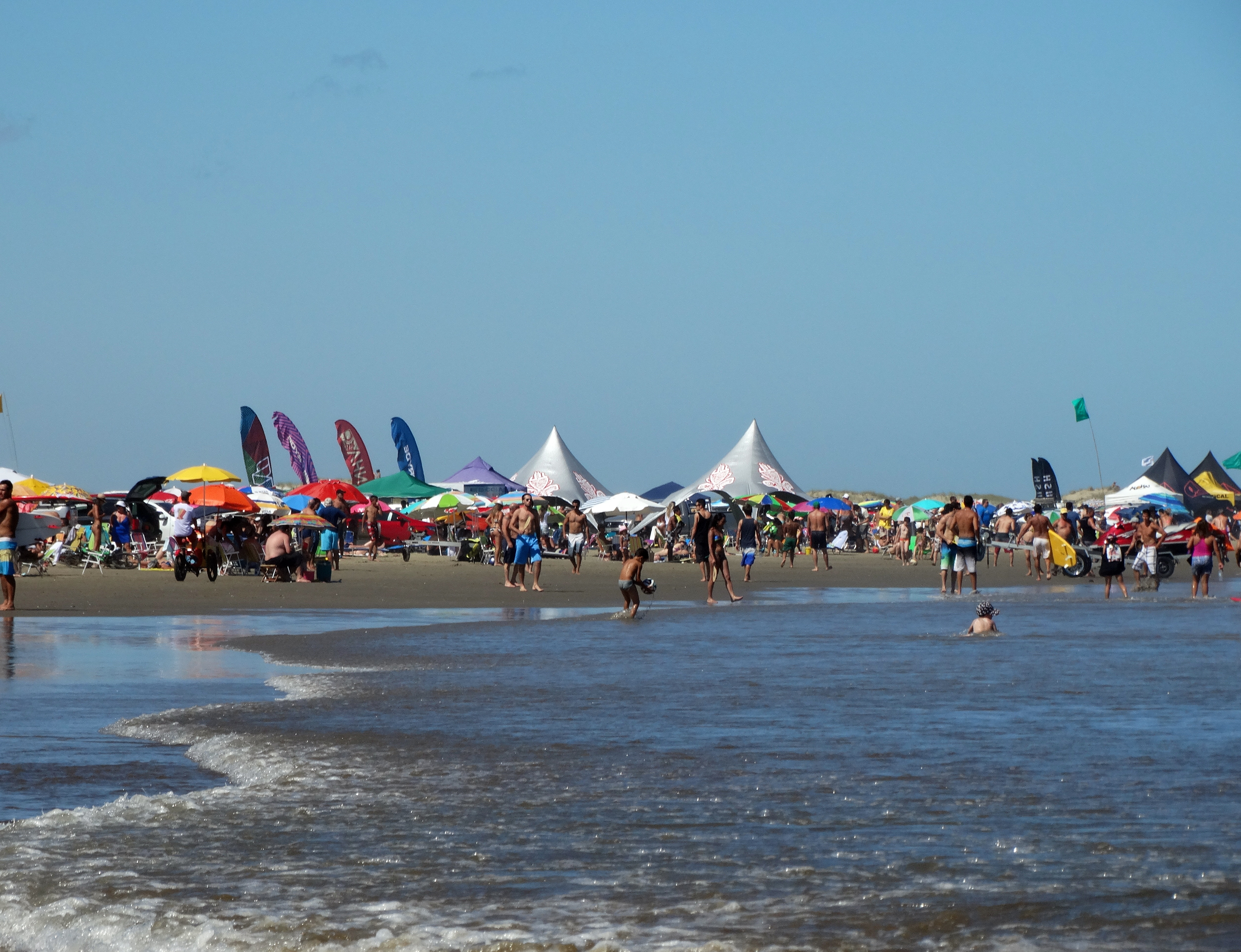

- Location within Brazil
- Coordinates: 33.126°S 52.639°W
- Location: Rio Grande do Sul, Brazil
- Water bodies: South Atlantic Ocean

Dimensions
  - Length: 212 km

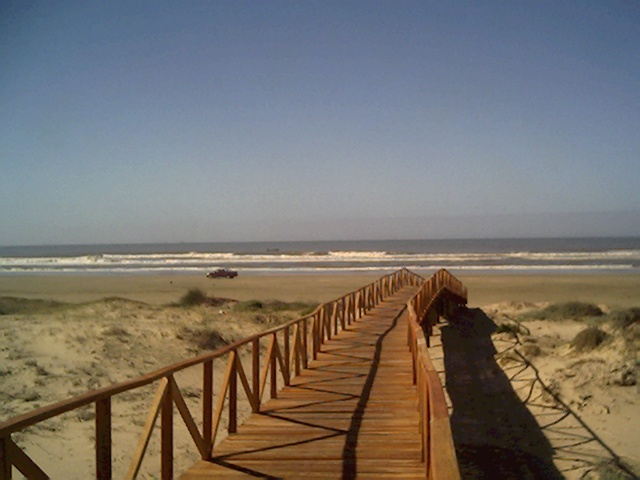
A catwalk at Praia do Cassino

Praia do Cassino (Portuguese for Casino Beach) is the world's longest sea beach and is in the southernmost part of the Brazilian coast (33°07′34″S 52°38′20″W), on the South Atlantic Ocean, in the Rio Grande do Sul state. The beach is treated by some as the longest uninterrupted ocean sandy beach in the world, with estimates of 212 kilometres (132 mi) to 254 kilometres (158 mi); but this claim is hard to make due to the coastline paradox.

The beach is a popular tourist destination first developed in the late 19th century and subsequently expanding in popularity over time. Recent estimates suggest over 150,000 tourists visit the beach every year.

== Etymology ==
The word “cassino”, in Brazilian Portuguese, literally means ”casino” (a gambling establishment) in English. The beach is named “Casino Beach” as, historically, tourists used to be able to gamble and play various games like Poker, Craps, and Blackjack within the luxury hotels overlooking the beach and the Atlantic.

== Geography and longest beach claim ==
It is purported to be the longest uninterrupted sandy seashore in the world, with various sources measuring it from 212 kilometres (132 mi) to 254 kilometres (158 mi), stretching from the Molhes (breakwaters) at the entrance of the Rio Grande seaport to the mouth of the Chuí Stream, which forms the border with Uruguay, in the south.

Due to the coastline paradox, it is difficult to determine both its length as well as its proclaimed status as the longest beach in the world, as the measurements are highly dependent on the resolution at which a beach is recorded. The more accurately the nooks and crannies of a given beach are measured, the longer the beach will inevitably become.

== History ==
Praia do Cassino is known as the oldest, most popular public beach in Brazil, dating back to 1890. The area was developed by the Suburban Mangueira Company to be a tourist destination. The director of the company (Antônio Cândido Sequeira) and his investors, acquired the land and beach area with the help of the state government, debuting with a tourist complex on January 26, 1890. Over time, this tourist center became very popular, with big companies interested in investing in it. At the time, Brazilians of mainly European descent (German, English, Portuguese, and Italian, predominantly) often traveled to the beach to enjoy the sea, gamble at the casinos, and relax in the luxury hotels. The persecution of Italians and Germans during World War II, and the subsequent ban on roulette in 1948, had a lasting impact on the region's economy. However, in modern times, the Praia do Cassino area has witnessed a resurgence in local popularity.

On November 12, 1966, during a total solar eclipse visible from Praia do Cassino, NASA scientists and the U.S. Army launched several rockets to study the upper atmosphere.

The largest beach ultramarathon race in the world is held on this beach, the Cassino Ultra Race. The marathon is a long-distance race that sees participants traveling a distance of 230 km over the sand, though it can also be run in the 73K and 135K modality. It begins at Praia Barra del Chuí and ends at Praia do Cassino.

== Tourism ==
Around 150,000 tourists visit Praia do Cassino every year. During summer, especially from December to January, the number of tourists visiting this place increases. Tourists can be seen participating in various activities including swimming and surfing. This beach is home to the largest number of seals in the world. Many tourists visit these seals by boat.

== Tourist attractions ==
=== West Jetty ===
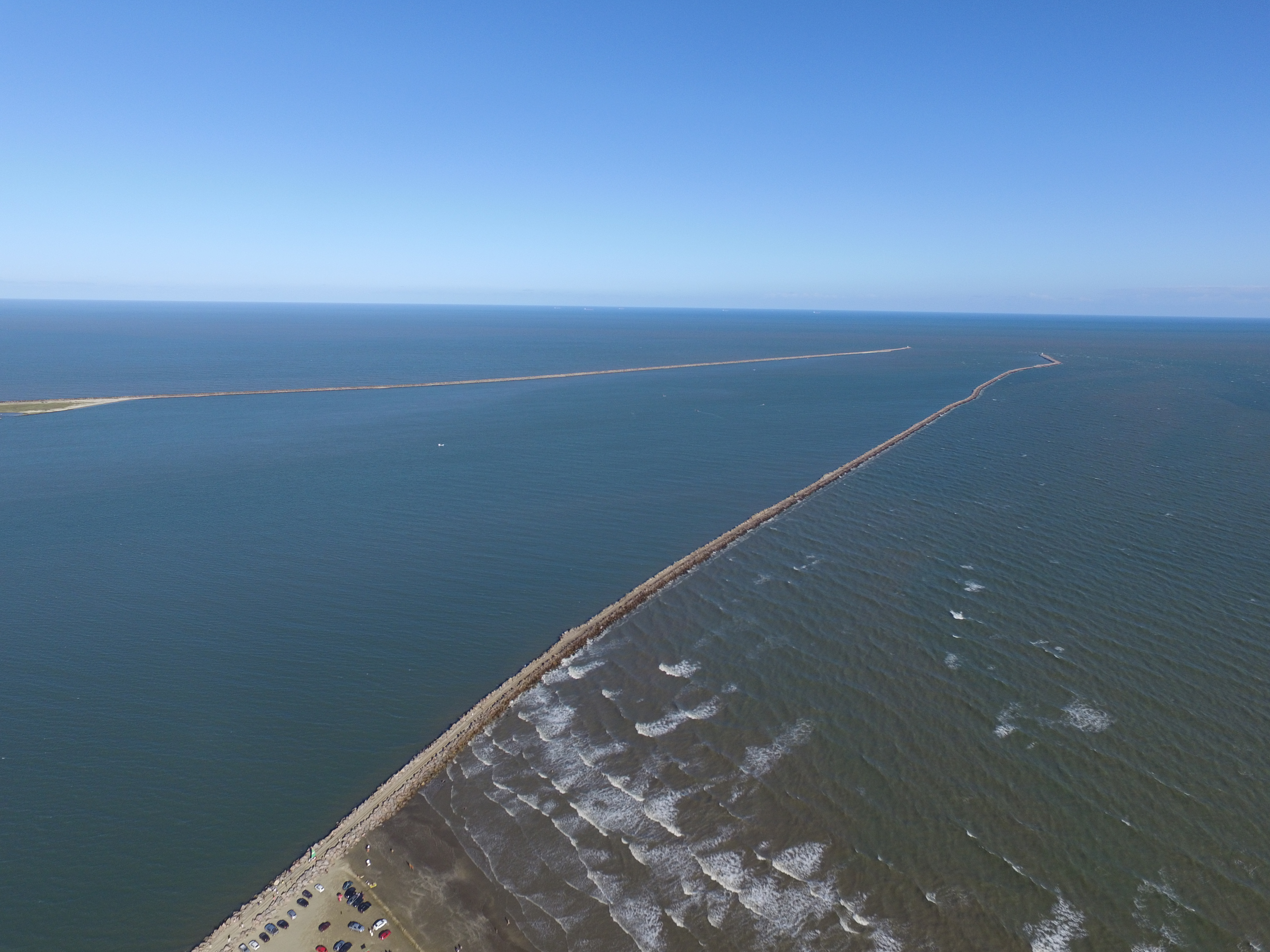
West jetty from above

At the extreme point of the beach, a jetty was built with tons of stones that invade the open sea. Its formation, along with the Molhe Leste, on the other side of the navigation channel, protects the entry and exit of ships to the Rio Grande. At Molhe Oeste it is possible to take a cart, powered by sail, which slowly slides along the tracks into the ocean until it reaches the lighthouse tower. The trip takes about 20 minutes and covers a length of 4.3 kilometers. On the way, you can still be lucky enough to see dolphins and grebes.

The resort has a carnival that brings together hundreds of people, with several carnival groups brightening up this resort-neighborhood.

=== Stranded ship ===
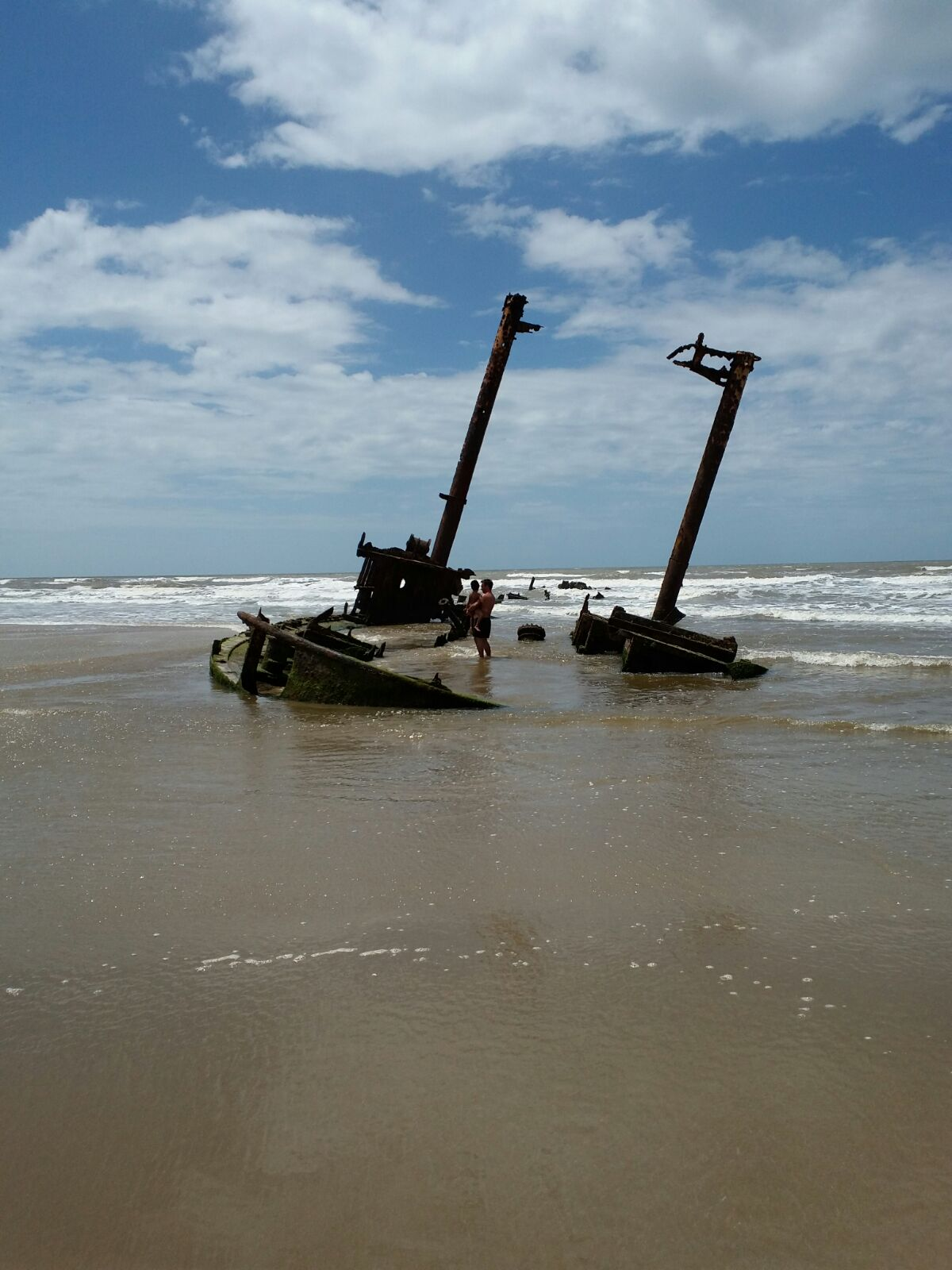
Altair ship in February 2016

Sixteen kilometers from the center of the Casino towards Chuí, the ship Altair has been stranded on the edge of the beach since June 1976, after facing a strong storm.

=== Yemanja statue ===
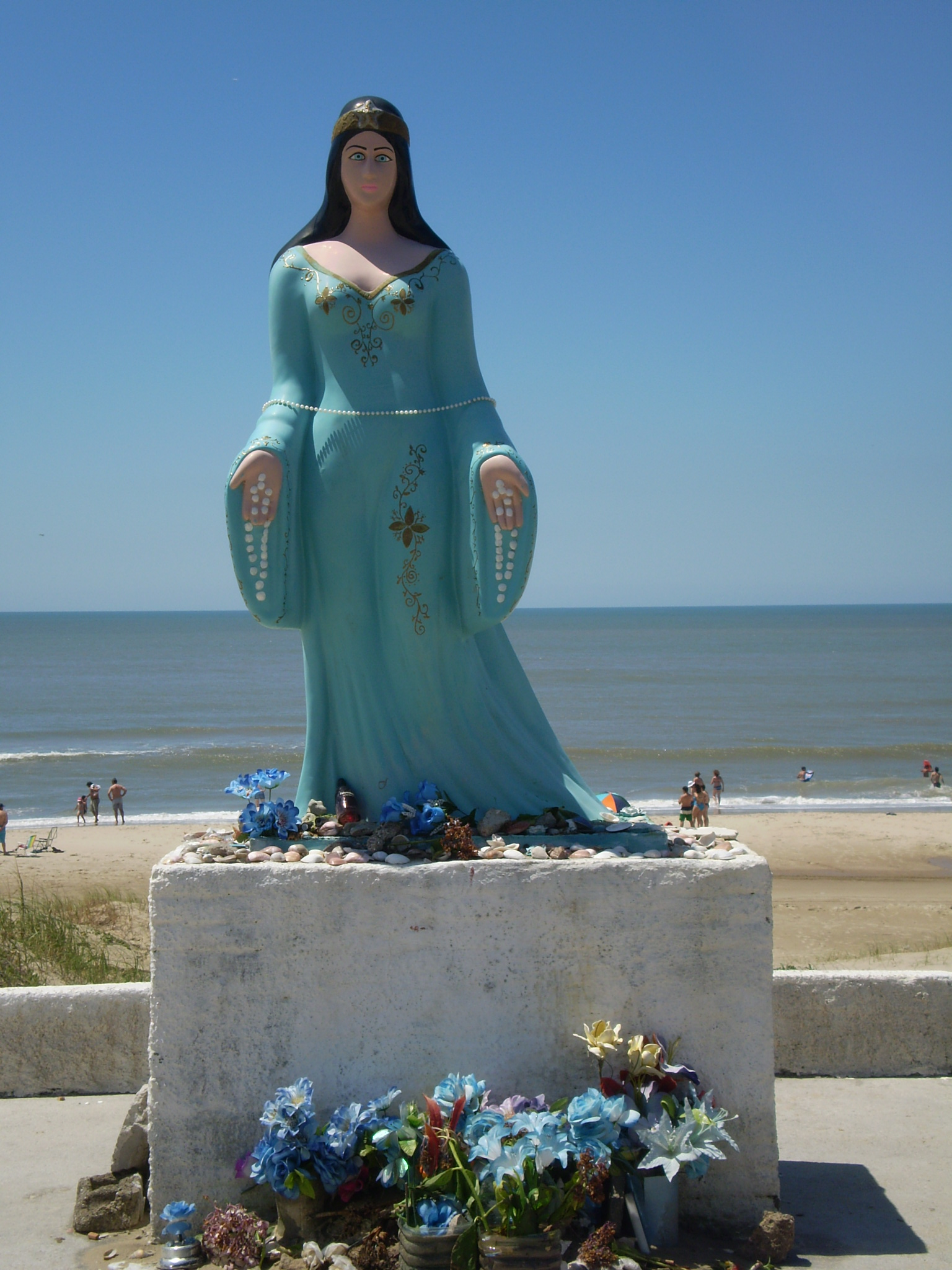
Yemanja statue

This sculpture is located in front of the sea at the entrance to Rio Grande Avenue. The artist was Rio Grande native Erico Gobbi who made this sculpture with cement.

== Gallery ==
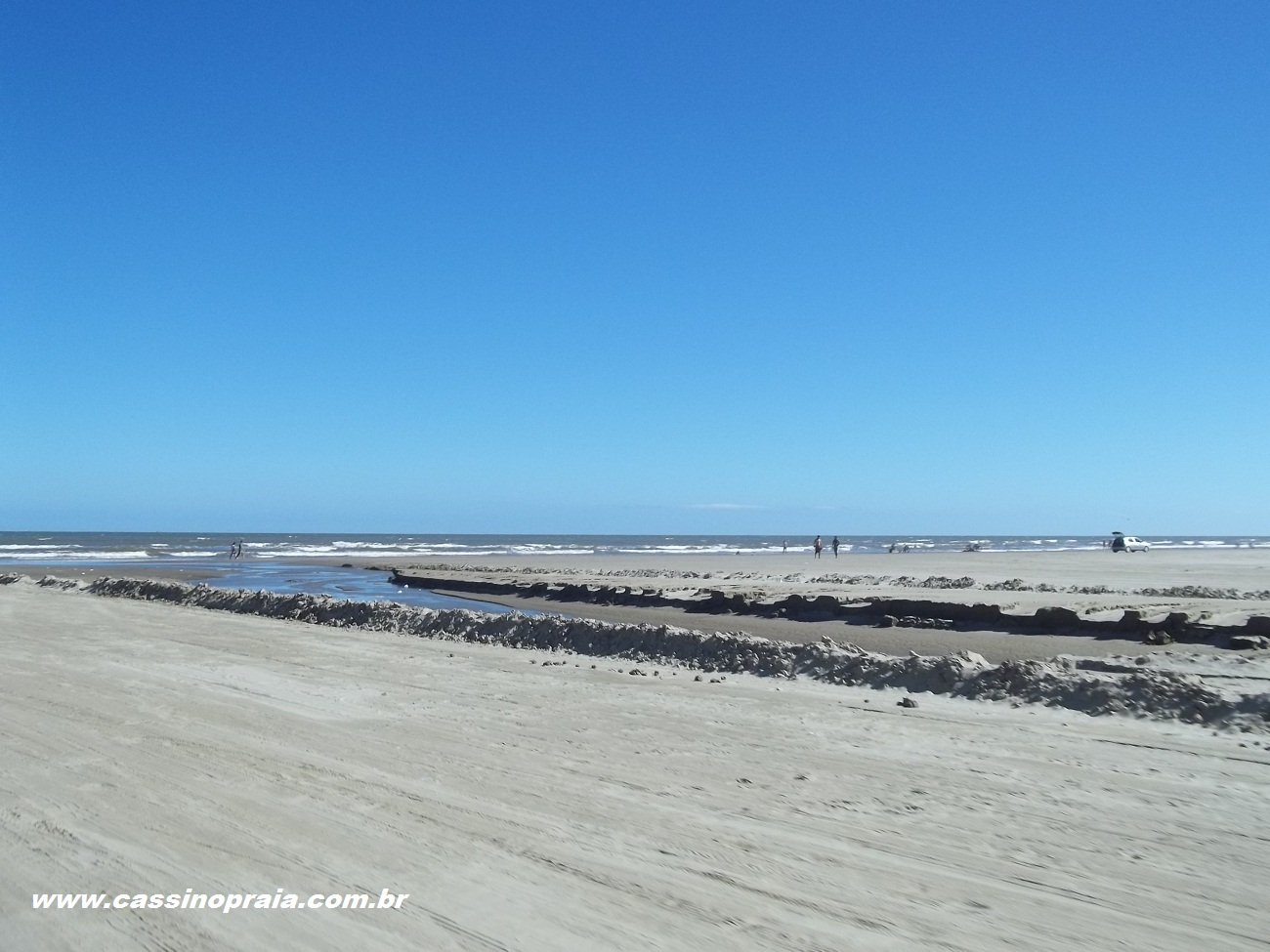
Beach area

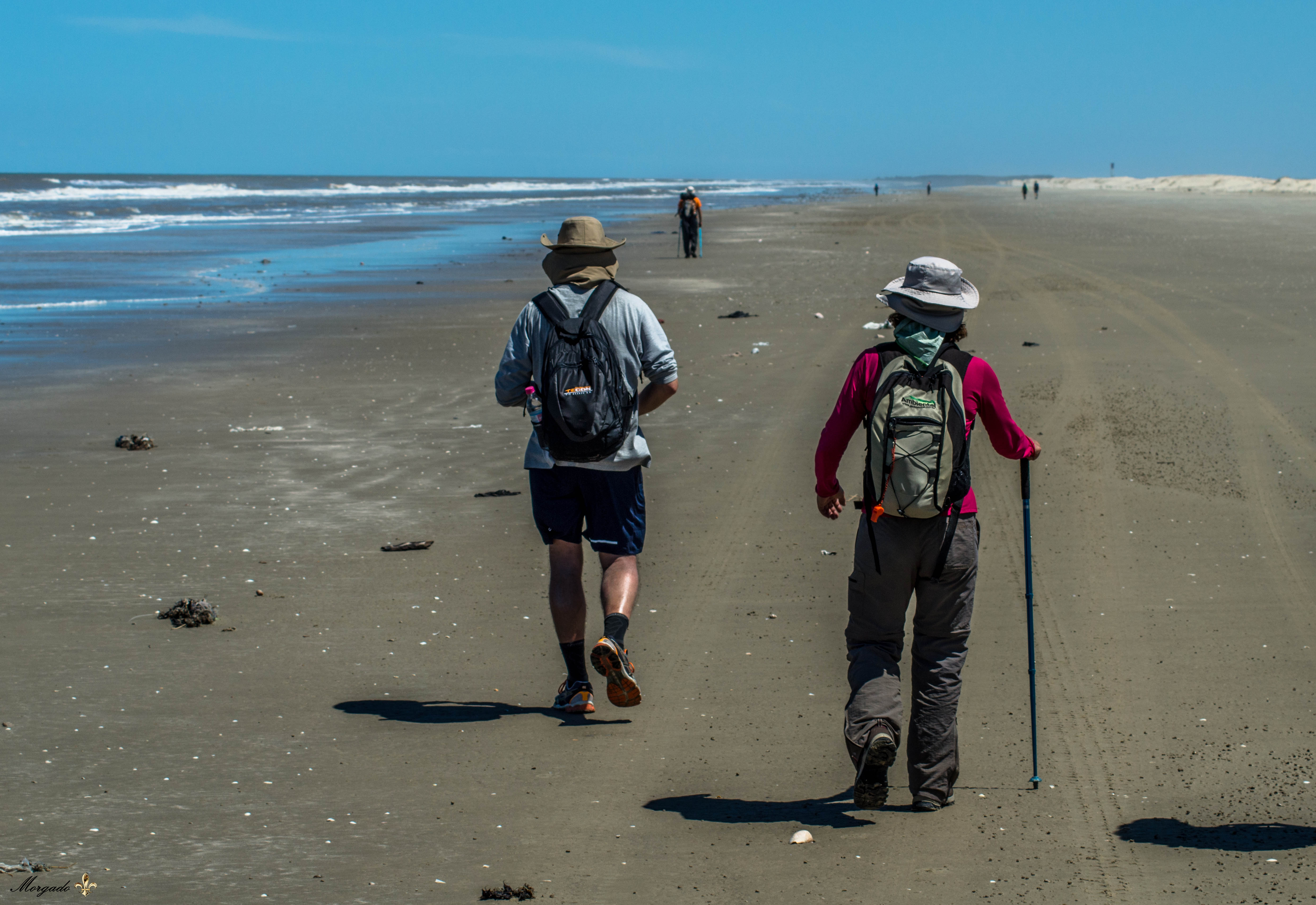
Tourists in the beach area

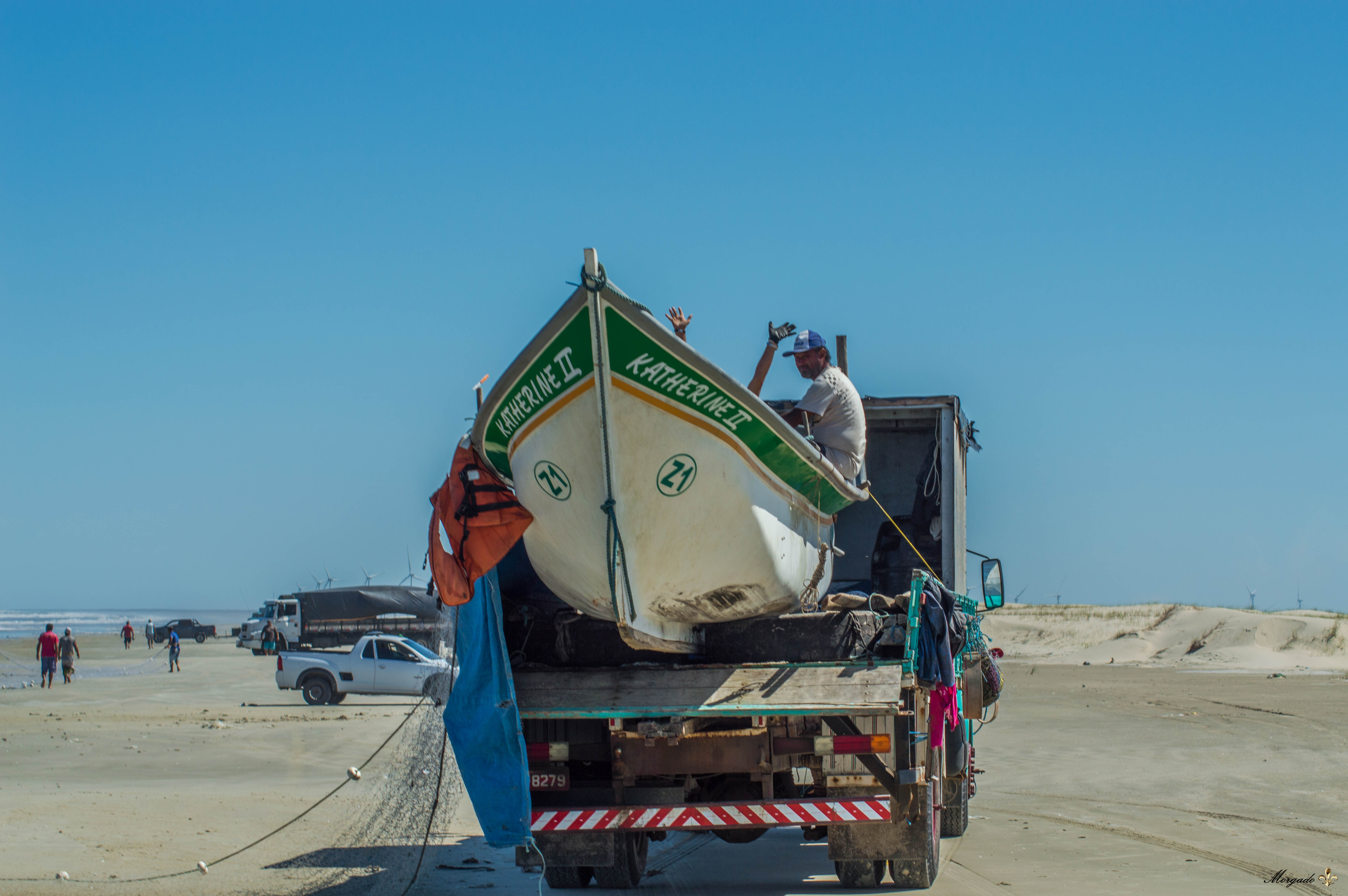
Boat transport vehicles

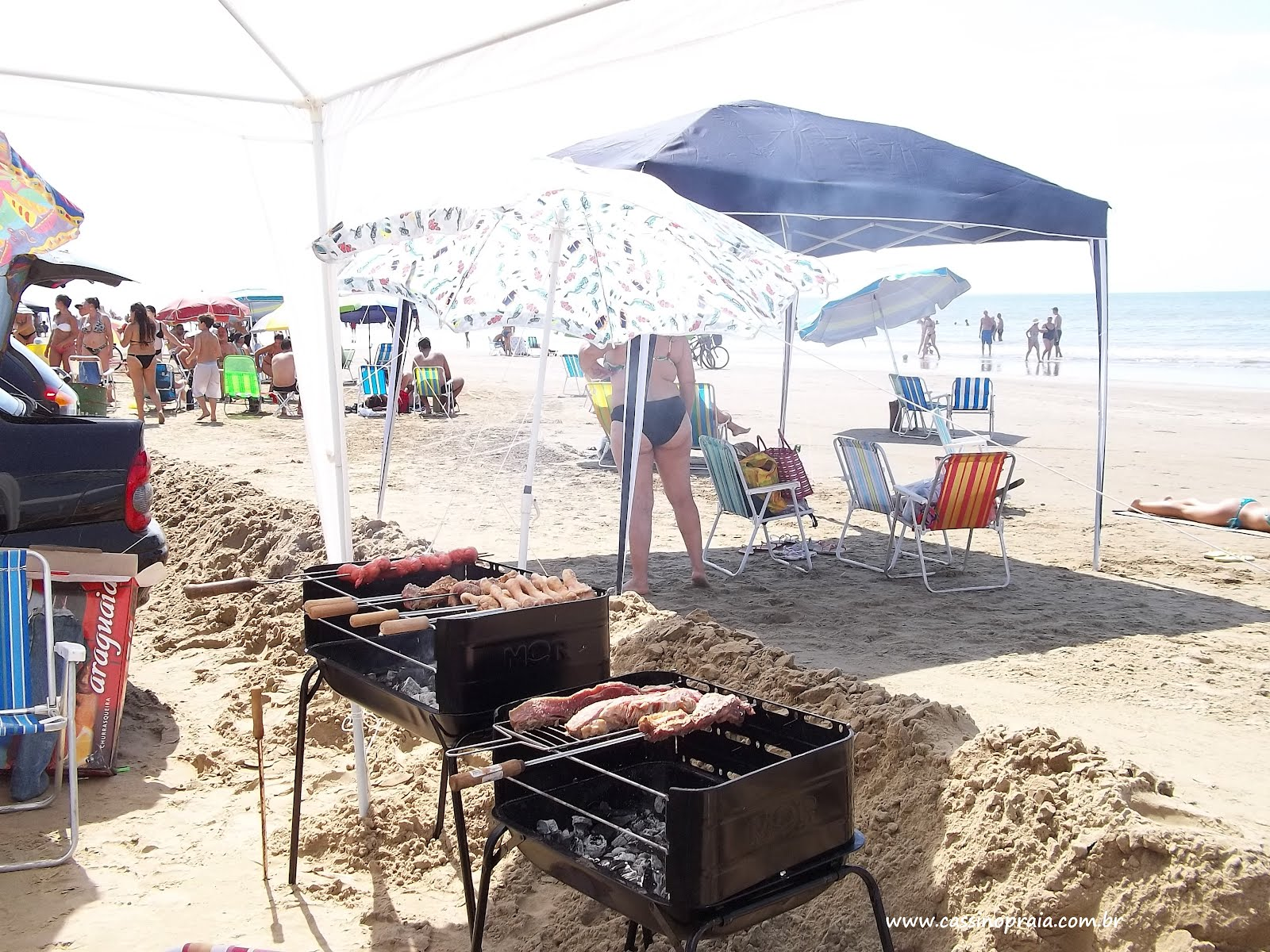
Barbecue at Cassino

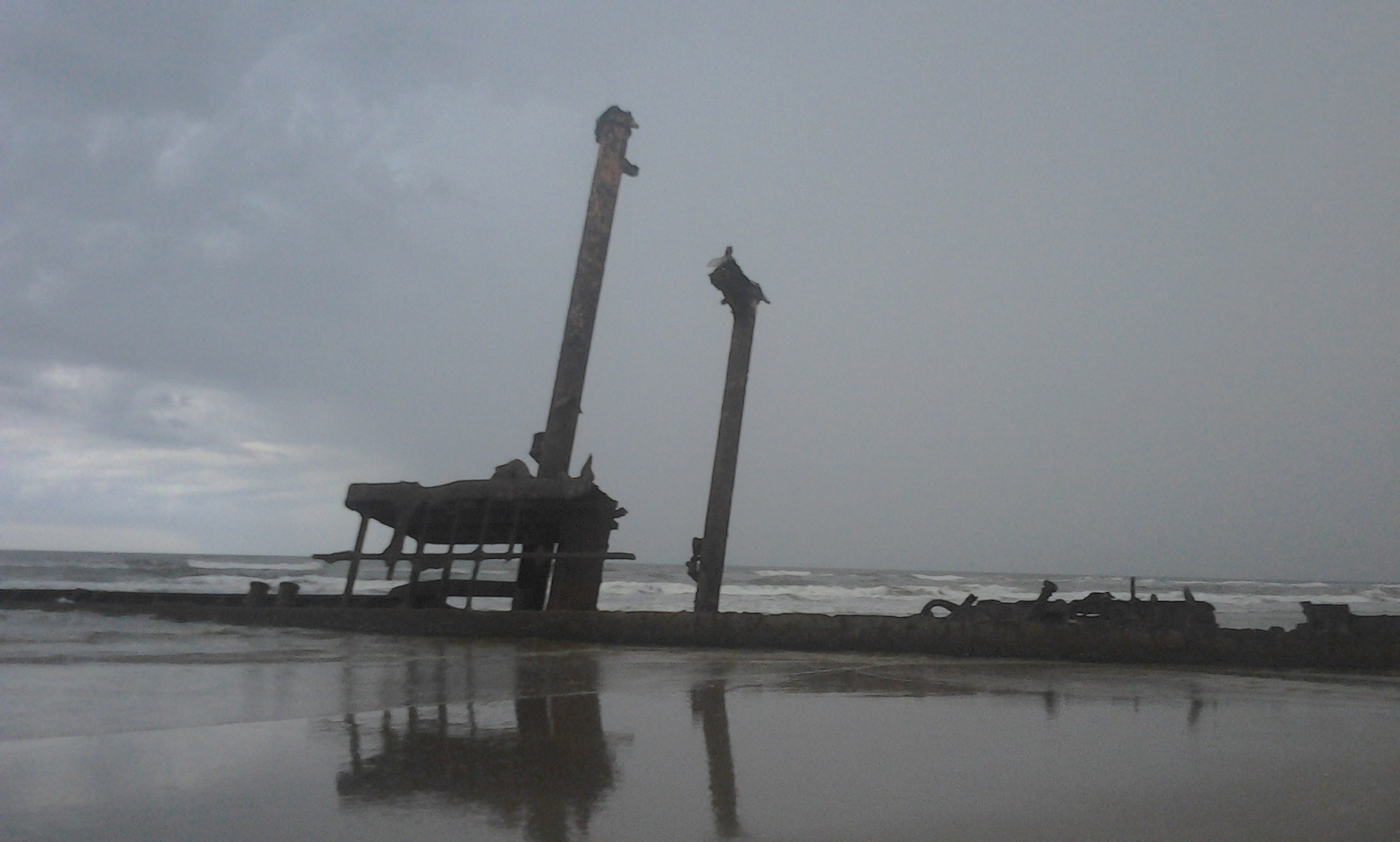
Altair ship

== See also ==
- List of longest beaches
