= Coastline paradox =

Counterintuitive observation

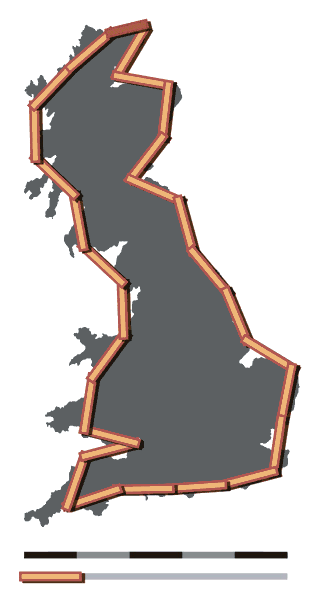
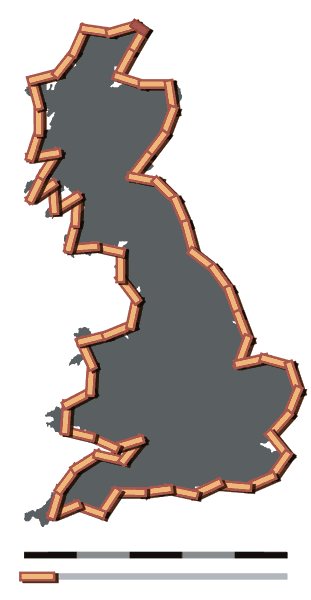
An example of the coastline paradox. If the coastline of Great Britain is measured using units 100 km (62 mi) long, then the length of the coastline is approximately 2,800 km (1,700 mi). With 50 km (31 mi) units, the total length is approximately 3,400 km (2,100 mi), approximately 600 km (370 mi) longer.

The coastline paradox is the counterintuitive observation that the coastline of a landmass does not have a well-defined length or perimeter. This results from the fractal curve–like properties of coastlines, namely the fact that a coastline typically has a fractal dimension. Although the "paradox of length" was previously noted by Hugo Steinhaus, the first systematic study of this phenomenon was by Lewis Fry Richardson, and it was expanded upon by Benoit Mandelbrot.

The measured length of the coastline depends on the method used to measure it and the degree of cartographic generalization. Since a landmass has features at all scales, from hundreds of kilometers in size to tiny fractions of a millimeter and below, there is no obvious size of the smallest feature that should be taken into consideration when measuring, and hence no single well-defined perimeter to the landmass. Various approximations, such as the Minkowski–Bouligand dimension, exist when specific assumptions are made about minimum feature size.

The problem is fundamentally different from the measurement of other, simpler edges. It is possible, for example, to accurately measure the length of a straight, idealized metal bar by using a measurement device to determine that the length is less than a certain amount and greater than another amount—that is, to measure it within a certain degree of uncertainty. The more precise the measurement device, the closer the results will be to the true length of the edge. With a coastline, however, measuring in finer and finer detail does not improve the accuracy; it merely adds to the total. Unlike with the metal bar, it is impossible even in theory to obtain an exact value for the length of a coastline.

In three-dimensional space, the coastline paradox is readily extended to the concept of fractal surface structures, whereby the area of a surface varies depending on the measurement resolution.

== Discovery ==
Shortly before 1951, Lewis Fry Richardson, in researching the possible effect of border lengths on the probability of war, noticed that the Portuguese reported their measured border with Spain to be 987 km (613 mi), but the Spanish reported it as 1,214 km (754 mi). This was the beginning of the coastline problem, which is a mathematical uncertainty inherent in the measurement of boundaries that are irregular.

The prevailing method of estimating the length of a border (or coastline) was to lay out n equal straight-line segments of length l with dividers on a map or aerial photograph. Each end of the segment must be on the boundary. Investigating the discrepancies in border estimation, Richardson discovered what is now termed the "Richardson effect": the sum of the segments monotonically increases when the common length of the segments decreases. In effect, the shorter the ruler, the longer the measured border; the Spanish and Portuguese geographers were simply using different-length rulers.

The result most astounding to Richardson is that, under certain circumstances, as l approaches zero, the length of the coastline approaches infinity. Richardson had believed, based on Euclidean geometry, that a coastline would approach a fixed length, as do similar estimations of regular geometric figures. For example, the perimeter of a regular polygon inscribed in a circle approaches the circumference with increasing numbers of sides (and decrease in the length of one side). In geometric measure theory, such a smooth curve as the circle that can be approximated by small straight segments with a definite limit is termed a rectifiable curve. Benoit Mandelbrot devised an alternative measure of length for coastlines, the Hausdorff dimension, and showed that it does not depend on the length l in the same way.

== Mathematical aspects ==
The basic concept of length originates from Euclidean distance. In Euclidean geometry, a straight line represents the shortest distance between two points. This line has only one length. On the surface of a sphere, this is replaced by the geodesic length (also called the great circle length), which is measured along the surface curve that exists in the plane containing both endpoints and the center of the sphere. The length of basic curves is more complicated but can also be calculated. Measuring with rulers, one can approximate the length of a curve by adding the sum of the straight lines which connect the points:

Using a few straight lines to approximate the length of a curve will produce an estimate lower than the true length; when increasingly short (and thus more numerous) lines are used, the sum approaches the curve's true length, and that length is the least upper bound or supremum of all such approximations. A precise value for this length can be found using calculus, the branch of mathematics enabling the calculation of infinitesimally small distances. The following animation illustrates how a smooth curve can be meaningfully assigned a precise length:

Not all curves can be measured in this way. A fractal is, by definition, a curve whose perceived complexity does not decrease with measurement scale. Whereas approximations of a smooth curve tend to a single value as measurement precision increases, the measured value for a fractal does not converge.

This Sierpiński curve (a type of space-filling curve), which repeats the same pattern on a smaller and smaller scale, continues to increase in length. If understood to iterate within an infinitely subdivisible geometric space, its length tends to infinity. At the same time, the area enclosed by the curve does converge to a precise figure—just as, analogously, the area of an island can be calculated more easily than the length of its coastline.

As the length of a fractal curve always diverges to infinity, if one were to measure a coastline with infinite or near-infinite resolution, the length of the infinitely short kinks in the coastline would add up to infinity. However, this figure relies on the assumption that space can be subdivided into infinitesimal sections. The truth value of this assumption—which underlies Euclidean geometry and serves as a useful model in everyday measurement—is a matter of philosophical speculation, and may or may not reflect the changing realities of "space" and "distance" on the atomic level (approximately the scale of a nanometer).

Coastlines are less definite in their construction than idealized fractals such as the Mandelbrot set because they are formed by various natural events that create patterns in statistically random ways, whereas idealized fractals are formed through repeated iterations of simple, formulaic sequences.

=== Measuring a coastline ===
An animation showing the increasing length of the coastline of the island of Great Britain with decreasing measuring units (coarse-graining length)

More than a decade after Richardson completed his work, Benoit Mandelbrot developed a new branch of mathematics called fractal geometry to describe just such non-rectifiable complexes in nature as the infinite coastline. His own definition of the new figure serving as the basis for his study is:

I coined fractal from the Latin adjective fractus. The corresponding Latin verb frangere means "to break:" to create irregular fragments. It is therefore sensible ... that, in addition to "fragmented" ... fractus should also mean "irregular".

In "How Long Is the Coast of Britain? Statistical Self-Similarity and Fractional Dimension", published on 5 May 1967, Mandelbrot discusses self-similar curves that have Hausdorff dimension between 1 and 2. These curves are examples of fractals, although Mandelbrot does not use this term in the paper, as he did not coin it until 1975. The paper is one of Mandelbrot's first publications on the topic of fractals.

Empirical evidence suggests that the smaller the increment of measurement, the longer the measured length becomes. If one were to measure a stretch of coastline with a yardstick, one would get a shorter result than if the same stretch were measured with a 1-foot (30 cm) ruler. This is because one would be laying the ruler along a more curvilinear route than that followed by the yardstick. The empirical evidence suggests a rule which, if extrapolated, shows that the measured length increases without limit as the measurement scale decreases towards zero. This discussion implies that it is meaningless to talk about the length of a coastline; some other means of quantifying coastlines are needed. Mandelbrot then describes various mathematical curves, related to the Koch snowflake, which are defined in such a way that they are strictly self-similar. Mandelbrot shows how to calculate the Hausdorff dimension of each of these curves, each of which has a dimension D between 1 and 2 (he also mentions but does not give a construction for the space-filling Peano curve, which has a dimension exactly 2). The paper does not claim that any coastline or geographic border actually has fractional dimension. Instead, it notes that Richardson's empirical law is compatible with the idea that geographic curves, such as coastlines, can be modelled by random self-similar figures of fractional dimension. Near the end of the paper Mandelbrot briefly discusses how one might approach the study of fractal-like objects in nature that look random rather than regular. For this he defines statistically self-similar figures and says that these are encountered in nature. The paper is important because it is a "turning point" in Mandelbrot's early thinking on fractals. It is an example of the linking of mathematical objects with natural forms that was a theme of much of his later work.

A key property of some fractals is self-similarity; that is, at any scale the same general configuration appears. A coastline is perceived as bays alternating with promontories. In the hypothetical situation that a given coastline has this property of self-similarity, then no matter how great any one small section of coastline is magnified, a similar pattern of smaller bays and promontories superimposed on larger bays and promontories appears, right down to the grains of sand. At that scale the coastline appears as a momentarily shifting, potentially infinitely long thread with a stochastic arrangement of bays and promontories formed from the small objects at hand. In such an environment (as opposed to smooth curves) Mandelbrot asserts "coastline length turns out to be an elusive notion that slips between the fingers of those who want to grasp it".

There are different kinds of fractals. A coastline with the stated property is in "a first category of fractals, namely curves whose fractal dimension is greater than 1". That last statement represents an extension by Mandelbrot of Richardson's thought. Mandelbrot's statement of the Richardson effect is:

$L(\varepsilon) \sim F\varepsilon^{1-D},$

where L, coastline length, a function of the measurement unit ε, is approximated by the expression. F is a constant, and D is a parameter that Richardson found depended on the coastline approximated by L. He gave no theoretical explanation, but Mandelbrot identified D with a non-integer form of the Hausdorff dimension, later the fractal dimension. Rearranging the expression yields

$F\varepsilon^{-D} \cdot \varepsilon,$

where Fε^{−D} must be the number of units ε required to obtain L. The broken line measuring a coast does not extend in one direction nor does it represent an area, but is intermediate between the two and can be thought of as a band of width 2ε. D is its fractal dimension, ranging between 1 and 2 (and typically less than 1.5). More broken coastlines have greater D, and therefore L is longer for the same ε. D is approximately 1.02 for the coastline of South Africa, and approximately 1.25 for the west coast of Great Britain. For lake shorelines, the typical value of D is 1.28.

== Solutions ==
The coastline paradox describes a problem with real-world applications, including trivial matters such as which river, beach, border, coastline is the longest, with the former two records a matter of fierce debate; furthermore, the problem extends to demarcating territorial boundaries, property rights, erosion monitoring, and the theoretical implications of our geometric modelling. To resolve this problem, several solutions have been proposed. These solutions resolve the practical problems around the problem by setting the definition of "coastline", establishing the practical physical limits of a coastline, and using mathematical integers within these practical limitations to calculate the length to a meaningful level of precision. These practical solutions to the problem can resolve the problem for all practical applications while it persists as a theoretical/mathematical concept within the models.

== Criticisms and misunderstandings ==
The coastline paradox is often criticized because coastlines are inherently finite, real features in space, and, therefore, there is a quantifiable answer to their length.

The source of the paradox is based on the way reality is measured and is most relevant when attempting to use those measurements to create cartographic models of coasts. Modern technology, such as LiDAR, Global Positioning Systems and Geographic Information Systems, has made addressing the paradox much easier; however, the limitations of survey measurements and the vector software persist. Critics argue that these problems are more theoretical and not practical considerations for planners.

Alternately, the concept of a coast "line" is in itself a human construct that depends on assignment of tidal datum which is not flat relative to any vertical datum, and thus any line constructed between land and sea somewhere in the intertidal zone is semi-arbitrary and in constant flux. Thus wide number of "shorelines" may be constructed for varied analytical purposes using different data sources and methodologies, each with a different length. This may complicate the quantification of ecosystem services using methods that depend on shoreline length.

== See also ==
- Alaska boundary dispute – Alaskan and Canadian claims to the Alaskan Panhandle differed greatly, based on competing interpretations of the ambiguous phrase setting the border at "a line parallel to the windings of the coast", applied to the fjord-dense region.
- Fractal dimension
- Gabriel's horn, a geometric figure with infinite surface area but finite volume
- Arc length
- List of countries by length of coastline
- Scale (geography)
- Paradox of the heap
- Staircase paradox, similar paradox where a straight segment approximation converges to a different value
- Zeno's paradoxes
- List of longest beaches
- List of river systems by length
- List of countries and territories by number of land borders
