= Filter transition region =

In signal processing, a filter's frequency response comprises regions of frequency called passbands, stopbands, and transition regions. Typically there is one of each, but there may be multiples. A transition region (or transition band) is the interval between a passband and a stopband, where the curve of amplitude vs frequency continuously changes between a high level and a low level.

== See also ==
- Transition Band
