= List of lighthouses in Brazil =

This is a list of lighthouses in Brazil. They are located along the Atlantic coastline and islands of Brazil. These are named landfall lights, or those with a range of over twenty-five nautical miles.

== Lighthouses ==
Name	Image	Location & coordinates	Year built	Tower height	Focal height	Class of light	Range nml	Admiralty number	NGA number
Abrolhos Lighthouse		Abrolhos Islands; 17°57′53″S 38°41′39″W	1861	22 m (72 ft)	60 m (197 ft)	Fl W 6s.	51 nmi (94 km)	G0306	18200
Albardão Lighthouse	Image	Santa Vitória do Palmar; 33°12′09″S 52°42′22″W	1948	44 m (144 ft)	50 m (164 ft)	Fl (4) W 25s.	42 nmi (78 km)	G0640	19008
Alcatrazes Lighthouse	Image	Ihla do Porto; 24°05′44″S 45°42′11″W	1912 est.	7 m (23 ft)	24 m (79 ft)	Fl W 6s.	15 nmi (28 km)	G0490	18624
Alcobaça Lighthouse		Alcobaça, Bahia; 17°31′00″S 39°11′33″W	1934 est.	24 m (79 ft)	28 m (92 ft)	Fl W 15s.	15 nmi (28 km)	G0300	18188
Alto da Bandeira Lighthouse	Image	Fernando de Noronha; 3°52′29″S 32°27′41″W	n/a	10 m (33 ft)	203 m (666 ft)	Al Fl (2) W (1) R 30s.	white: 28 nmi (52 km) red: 24 nmi (44 km)	G0144	17792
Araranguá Lighthouse		Araranguá; 28°56′05″S 49°21′45″W	1953	8 m (26 ft)	82 m (269 ft)	Fl (3) W 20s.	25 nmi (46 km)	G0602	18924
Araripe Lighthouse		Santa Cruz Cabrália; 16°08′06″S 38°57′51″W	n/a	40 m (131 ft)	70 m (230 ft)	L Fl W 10s.	17 nmi (31 km)	G0294	18174
Arroio do Sal Lighthouse	Image	Arroio do Sal; 29°33′25″S 49°53′22″W	1993	40 m (131 ft)	42 m (138 ft)	Fl (5) W 30s.	24 nmi (44 km)	G0605	18930
Atafona Lighthouse	Image	São João da Barra; 21°37′31″S 41°00′54″W	2007	25 m (82 ft)	30 m (98 ft)	Fl (2) W 15s.	16 nmi (30 km)	G0338	18332
Bacopari Lighthouse		Baía Formosa; 6°22′28″S 34°59′31″W	1919 est.	17 m (56 ft)	30 m (98 ft)	Fl (2) w 10s.	15 nmi (28 km)	G0184	17884
Barra Rio Grande Lighthouse		São José do Norte; Rio Grande do Sul; 32°07′04″S 52°04′37″W	1847	31 m (102 ft)	32 m (105 ft)	Oc (6) W 21s.	30 nmi (56 km)	G0620	18964
Barreiras do Prado Lighthouse		Prado, Bahia; 17°17′15″S 39°13′19″W	1955	22 m (72 ft)	42 m (138 ft)	Fl (2) W 12s.	16 nmi (30 km)	G0299	18184
Belem Lighthouse		Belém; 1°27′55″S 48°30′20″W	2005	42 m (138 ft)	45 m (148 ft)	Fl W 20s.	15 nmi (28 km)	G0042.3	17599
Belmonte Lighthouse	Image	Belmonte, Bahia; 15°51′49″S 15°51′49″W	1901	34 m (112 ft)	36 m (118 ft)	Fl W 6s.	21 nmi (39 km)	G0292	18172
Berta Lighthouse		Palmares do Sul; 30°23′59″S 50°17′23″W	n/a	40 m (131 ft)	42 m (138 ft)	Fl W 10s.	23 nmi (43 km)	G0609	18945
Cabo Branco Lighthouse		Ponta do Seixas; 7°08′55″S 34°47′48″W	1972	18 m (59 ft)	46 m (151 ft)	LFl W 10s.	27 nmi (50 km)	G0190	17904
Cabo de Santo Agostinho Lighthouse		Cabo de Santo Agostinho; 8°21′05″S 34°56′51″W	~1940	15 m (49 ft)	91 m (299 ft)	Fl W 10s.	22 nmi (41 km)	G0212	17960
Cabo de São Roque Lighthouse		Cape São Roque; 5°29′21″S 35°15′41″W	1911 est.	32 m (105 ft)	50 m (164 ft)	Fl (3) W 10s.	21 nmi (39 km)	G0172	17852
Cabo Frio Lighthouse		Ilha do Cabo Frio; 23°00′50″S 42°00′04″W	1925	16 m (52 ft)	140 m (459 ft)	Fl W 10s.	49 nmi (91 km)	G0352	18360
Cabo Orange Lighthouse		Oiapoque; 4°25′51″N 51°32′16″W	1997	48 m (157 ft)	50 m (164 ft)	Fl (2) W 15s.	18 nmi (33 km)	G0005	17458
Caeté Lighthouse	Image	Ajuruteua; 0°49′02″S 46°36′52″W	n/a	20 m (66 ft)	16 m (52 ft)	Q (2) W 6s.	15 nmi (28 km)	G0066	17664
Calcanhar Lighthouse		Touros; 5°09′40″S 35°29′12″W	1943	62 m (203 ft)	74 m (243 ft)	Fl W 10s.	38 nmi (70 km)	G0164	17836
Camaçari Lighthouse	Image	Camaçari; 12°44′31″S 38°08′57″W	n/a	20 m (66 ft)	20 m (66 ft)	Fl W 10s.	16 nmi (30 km)	G0236.2	18018
Camocim Lighthouse		Camocim; 2°51′47″S 40°51′37″W	1895 est.	15 m (49 ft)	20 m (66 ft)	Fl (3) W 10s.	15 nmi (28 km)	G0108	17748
Capão da Canoa Lighthouse	Image	Capão da Canoa; 29°44′42″S 50°00′17″W	1930 est.	24 m (79 ft)	27 m (89 ft)	Fl (2) W 10s.	15 nmi (28 km)	G0606	18932
Capão da Marca de Fora Lighthouse	Image	São José do Norte; 31°30′03″S 51°11′14″W	n/a	12 m (39 ft)	42 m (138 ft)	Fl (3) W 10s.	17 nmi (31 km)	G0613.3	18959.7
Chuí Lighthouse		Barra do Chuí; 33°44′31″S 53°22′23″W	1941	30 m (98 ft)	43 m (141 ft)	Fl (2) W 35s.	46 nmi (85 km)	G0644	19012
Cidreira Lighthouse	Image	Cidreira; 30°09′30″S 50°11′56″W	1933	30 m (98 ft)	33 m (108 ft)	Fl W 6s.	20 nmi (37 km)	G0608	18944
Comandatuba Lighthouse	Image	Ilha de Comandatuba; 15°21′08″S 38°58′51″W	1989	40 m (131 ft)	45 m (148 ft)	Fl (3) W 15s.	23 nmi (43 km)	G0290.5	18170
Conceição Lighthouse	Image	São José do Norte; 31°43′49″S 51°28′55″W	1929 est.	30 m (98 ft)	33 m (108 ft)	Fl (2) W 10s.	16 nmi (30 km)	G0616	18960
Curuçá Lighthouse		Curuçá; 0°33′53″S 47°45′59″W	1933 est.	42 m (138 ft)	44 m (144 ft)	Fl (3) W 15s.	18 nmi (33 km)	G0063	17656
Espirito Santo Lighthouse	Image	Marajó; 0°15′51″N 50°31′27″W	n/a	22 m (72 ft)	24 m (79 ft)	L Fl W 15s.	16 nmi (30 km)	G0007.4	17496
Estreito Lighthouse		São José do Norte; 31°52′50″S 51°46′16″W	n/a	40 m (131 ft)	42 m (138 ft)	L Fl W 15s.	17 nmi (31 km)	G0618	18962
Garcia D'Avila Lighthouse	Image	Mata de São João; 12°34′39″S 38°00′06″W	1971	25 m (82 ft)	28 m (92 ft)	Fl (2) W 12s.	21 nmi (39 km)	G0236	18016.
Guaxindiba Lighthouse	Image	São Francisco de Itabapoana; 21°27′56″S 41°02′34″W	2003	20 m (66 ft)	23 m (75 ft)	Fl (2) W 10s.	15 nmi (28 km)	G0336	18331
Icapara Lighthouse	Image	Iguape; 24°40′59″S 47°27′12″W	1991	10 m (33 ft)	73 m (240 ft)	L Fl W 15s.	19 nmi (35 km)	G0513.5	18702
Ilha Caiobá Lighthouse	Image	Matinhos; 25°51′10″S 48°32′09″W	n/a	9 m (30 ft)	27 m (89 ft)	Fl W 5s.	15 nmi (28 km)	G0538	18756
Ilha Camaleões Lighthouse		Ilha Camaleões; 0°09′10″S 48°54′39″W	n/a	35 m (115 ft)	37 m (121 ft)	L Fl W 15s.	16 nmi (30 km)	G0011.5	17534
Ilha da Moela Lighthouse	Image	Ilha da Moela; Guarujá; 24°03′02″S 46°15′48″W	1895	10 m (33 ft)	110 m (361 ft)	Al Oc WR 60s.	white: 40 nmi (74 km) red: 39 nmi (72 km)	G0496	18636
Ilha da Paz Lighthouse		São Francisco do Sul; 26°10′38″S 48°29′05″W	1906	16 m (52 ft)	84 m (276 ft)	L Fl W 20s.	26 nmi (48 km)	G0540	18760
Ilha da Queimada Grande Lighthouse		Ilha da Queimada Grande; 24°28′47″S 46°40′33″W	1909	10 m (33 ft)	83 m (272 ft)	Fl W 10s.	23 nmi (43 km)	G0512	18700
Ilha da Vitoria Lighthouse		Ilha da Vitoria; 25 mls offshore Caraguatatuba; 23°44′59″S 45°00′30″W	n/a	4 m (13 ft)	101 m (331 ft)	Fl W 6s.	16 nmi (30 km)	G0466	18568
Ilha de Santana Lighthouse	Image	Ilha de Santana; 2°16′14″S 43°37′26″W	1964	49 m (161 ft)	57 m (187 ft)	Al L Fl (2) W (1) R 51s.	31 nmi (57 km)	G0092	17716
Ilha do Apeú Lighthouse		Ilha do Apeú; 0°54′38″S 46°11′21″W	1943	41 m (135 ft)	38 m (125 ft)	Fl (2) W 15s.	15 nmi (28 km)	G0070	17668
Ilha do Arvoredo Lighthouse		Ilha do Arvoredo; 27°17′46″S 48°21′24″W	1883	16 m (52 ft)	90 m (295 ft)	Oc (2+2) W 60s.	24 nmi (44 km)	G0562	18856
Ilha do Bom Abrigo Lighthouse	Image	Ilha do Bom Abrigo; 25°07′24″S 47°51′43″W	1886	16 m (52 ft)	146 m (479 ft)	Al Fl (2) W (1) R 30s.	white: 28 nmi (52 km) red: 23 nmi (43 km)	G0516	18704
Ilha do Francês Lighthouse	Image	Ilha do Francês; 2 miles offshore Itapemirim, Espírito Santo; 20°55′39″S 40°45′19″W	1883	12 m (39 ft)	48 m (157 ft)	L Fl W 15s.	18 nmi (33 km)	G0332	18324
Ilha do Mangunca Lighthouse		Ilha do Mangunca; 1°36′57″S 44°39′17″W	n/a	40 m (131 ft)	46 m (151 ft)	Fl W 10s.	28 nmi (52 km)	G0074	17676
Ilha do Medo Lighthouse		São Luís, Maranhão; 2°31′21″S 44°21′56″W	n/a	31 m (102 ft)	60 m (197 ft)	Fl (3) W 15s.	25 nmi (46 km)	G0087	17696
Ilha do Pará Lighthouse	Image	Ilha do Pará; 0°52′44″N 49°59′19″W	1990s	30 m (98 ft)	33 m (108 ft)	Fl (3) W 10s.	16 nmi (30 km)	G0005.5	17474
Ilha Escalvada Lighthouse		Ilha Escalvada; 6 miles offshore Guarapari; 20°42′01″S 40°24′25″W	1907	12 m (39 ft)	27 m (89 ft)	Q (2) W 6s.	15 nmi (28 km)	G0330	18316
Ilha Maiau Lighthouse	Image	Ilha Maiau; 1°16′54″S 44°54′13″W	1940	30 m (98 ft)	38 m (125 ft)	L Fl W 10s.	20 nmi (37 km)	G0072	17672
Ilha Rasa Lighthouse		Ilha Rasa; Ipanema; 23°03′50″S 43°08′45″W	1829	26 m (85 ft)	101 m (331 ft)	Al Fl (2) W (1) R 15s.	white: 51 nmi (94 km) red: 45 nmi (83 km)	G0360	18372
Ilha Rata Lighthouse	Image	Fernando de Noronha; 3°48′46″S 32°23′12″W	n/a	21 m (69 ft)	63 m (207 ft)	Fl W 15s.	16 nmi (30 km)	G0132	17788
Ilhas Maricás Lighthouse	Image	Maricá, Rio de Janeiro; 23°00′55″S 42°55′13″W	1916 est.	10 m (33 ft)	80 m (262 ft)	L Fl W 15s.	16 nmi (30 km)	G0358	18368
Ilhéus Lighthouse		Ilhéus; 14°48′21″S 39°01′33″W	1916 est.	10 m (33 ft)	35 m (115 ft)	Fl W 10s.	23 nmi (43 km)	G0288	18160
Ilhota de Contas Lighthouse		Itacaré; 14°16′21″S 38°59′12″W	1929 est.	20 m (66 ft)	21 m (69 ft)	Fl W 10s.	15 nmi (28 km)	G0282	18156
Imbituba Lighthouse	Image	Imbituba; 28°14′02″S 48°38′47″W	1918	7 m (23 ft)	69 m (226 ft)	Fl (3) W 15s.	21 nmi (39 km)	G0592	18900
Itamoabo Lighthouse	Image	Ilha de Maré; 12°47′44″S 38°32′02″W	n/a	5 m (16 ft)	50 m (164 ft)	Q (2) W 3s.	15 nmi (28 km)	G0256	18066
Itapajé Lighthouse		Itarema; 2°52′17″S 39°56′39″W	1909 est.	43 m (141 ft)	46 m (151 ft)	Fl (2) W 15s.	20 nmi (37 km)	G0114	17760
Itapemirim Lighthouse		Itapemirim, Espírito Santo; 21°00′07″S 40°47′10″W	n/a	3 m (10 ft)	5 m (16 ft)	Fl W 10s.	15 nmi (28 km)	G0334	18328
Itapuã Lighthouse		Itapuã; 12°57′25″S 38°21′13″W	1873 est.	21 m (69 ft)	24 m (79 ft)	Fl W 6s.	15 nmi (28 km)	G0238	18024
Itariri Lighthouse	Image	Itariri; 11°57′30″S 37°37′20″W	n/a	30 m (98 ft)	75 m (246 ft)	Fl (5) W 60s.	26 nmi (48 km)	G0234.5	18013
Jericoacoara Lighthouse	Image	Jericoacoara; 2°47′17″S 40°29′59″W	1992	6 m (20 ft)	101 m (331 ft)	L Fl W 10s.	19 nmi (35 km)	G0110	17756
Juatinga Lighthouse	Image	Ponta da Juatinga; 23°17′38″S 44°30′19″W	n/a	8 m (26 ft)	175 m (574 ft)	Fl W 10s.	17 nmi (31 km)	G0458	18556
Laje da Conceiçaõ Lighthouse		Laje da Conceiçaõ; 7 mls offshore Itanhaém; 24°14′13″S 46°41′27″W	n/a	6 m (20 ft)	34 m (112 ft)	Fl (2) WR 12s.	white: 16 nmi (30 km) red: 17 nmi (31 km)	G0506	18692
Lençóis Grandes Lighthouse		Santo Amaro do Maranhão; 2°22′47″S 43°16′12″W	n/a	42 m (138 ft)	72 m (236 ft)	L Fl W 15s.	17 nmi (31 km)	G0093	17718
Luís Correia Lighthouse		Luís Correia; 2°54′05″S 41°33′21″W	1917 est.	14 m (46 ft)	29 m (95 ft)	Fl W 5s.	15 nmi (28 km)	G0104	17740
Macaé Lighthouse	Image	Macaé; 22°25′00″S 41°42′22″W	1902	16 m (52 ft)	156 m (512 ft)	Al L Fl WR 20s.	white: 28 nmi (52 km) red: 22 nmi (41 km)	G0346	18344
Maceió Lighthouse		Maceió; 9°39′23″S 35°43′32″W	1955	26 m (85 ft)	68 m (223 ft)	Al L Fl WR 20s.	white: 43 nmi (80 km) red: 36 nmi (67 km)	G0222	17976
Mangue Seco Lighthouse	Image	Mangue Seco; 11°27′47″S 37°21′56″W	1996	25 m (82 ft)	55 m (180 ft)	Fl W 6s.	15 nmi (28 km)	G0234.2	18012
Morro Branco Lighthouse		Beberibe; 4°09′32″S 38°06′28″W	n/a	25 m (82 ft)	107 m (351 ft)	Fl (5) W 60s.	24 nmi (44 km)	G0125.5	17802
Morro Grande Lighthouse	Image	Vitória, Espírito Santo; 20°18′09″S 40°18′36″W	n/a	12 m (39 ft)	208 m (682 ft)	Iso W 2s.	20 nmi (37 km)	G0322.1	18268
Morro de São Paulo Lighthouse		Ilha de Tinharé; 13°22′33″S 38°54′55″W	1885	26 m (85 ft)	89 m (292 ft)	Fl (2) W 15s.	23 nmi (43 km)	G0274	18148
Morro de Taipus Lighthouse	Image	Maraú; 13°57′22″S 38°56′34″W	n/a	25 m (82 ft)	76 m (249 ft)	Fl (3) W 15s.	23 nmi (43 km)	G0280	18155
Mostardas Lighthouse		Mostardas; 31°14′53″S 50°54′26″W	1940	38 m (125 ft)	39 m (128 ft)	Al Oc (2) W (2) R 40s.	white: 40 nmi (74 km) red: 34 nmi (63 km)	G0614	18956
Mucuri Lighthouse		Mucuri; 18°03′36″S 39°32′04″W	n/a	20 m (66 ft)	24 m (79 ft)	Fl W 6s.	16 nmi (30 km)	G0310	18210
Natal Lighthouse		Natal, Rio Grande do Norte; 5°47′43″S 35°11′07″W	1951	37 m (121 ft)	87 m (285 ft)	Fl (5) W 25s.	39 nmi (72 km)	G0177	17856
Nova Viçosa Lighthouse		Nova Viçosa; 17°53′54″S 39°22′24″W (NGA)	n/a	54.8 m (180 ft)	64 m (210 ft)	L Fl W 15s.	23 nmi (43 km)	G0305	18206
Olinda Lighthouse		Olinda; 8°00′41″S 34°50′50″W	1941	42 m (138 ft)	90 m (295 ft)	Fl (2) W 35s.	46 nmi (85 km)	G0202	17912
Peba Lighthouse	Image	Piaçabuçu; 10°29′25″S 36°23′12″W	n/a	40 m (131 ft)	43 m (141 ft)	L Fl W 15s.	17 nmi (31 km)	G0227	18000
Pedra Seca Lighthouse		Cabedelo; 6°57′23″S 34°49′22″W	1873	15 m (49 ft)	16 m (52 ft)	Fl (3) W 10s.	16 nmi (30 km)	G0188	17892
Penedos São Pedro e São Paulo Lighthouse		Saint Peter and Saint Paul Archipelago; 0°55′01″N 29°20′45″W	1995	6 m (20 ft)	29 m (95 ft)	Fl W 10s.	15 nmi (28 km)	G0130	17786
Pirajuba Lighthouse		Alcântara Municipality; 2°12′42″S 44°24′12″W	n/a	22 m (72 ft)	64 m (210 ft)	Fl (3) W 15s.	21 nmi (39 km)	G0078	17680
Pirarema Lighthouse		Alcântara Municipality; 2°20′19″S 44°21′43″W	n/a	12 m (39 ft)	55 m (180 ft)	Fl W 6s.	20 nmi (37 km)	G0079	17695
Ponta da Armação Lighthouse	Image	Niterói; 22°53′04″S 43°08′02″W	n/a	19 m (62 ft)	21 m (69 ft)	Fl W 10s.	19 nmi (35 km)	G0382.25	18413
Ponta da Galheta Lighthouse	Image	Barra da Lagoa; 27°34′33″S 48°24′59″W	n/a	10 m (33 ft)	150 m (492 ft)	Fl W 10s.	16 nmi (30 km)	G0562.5	18857
Ponta da Praia Grande Lighthouse		Praia de São Jorge; 1°10′01″S 45°38′06″W	~2000	45 m (148 ft)	47 m (154 ft)	Fl (5) W 60s.	24 nmi (44 km)	G0070.5	17670
Ponta da Tabatinga Lighthouse	Image	Tabatinga; 6°02′42″S 35°06′45″W	n/a	81 m (266 ft)	96 m (315 ft)	FL (5) W 60s.	24 nmi (44 km)	G0183	17882
Ponta das Almas Lighthouse		Barroquinha; 2°53′28″S 2°53′28″W	n/a	9 m (30 ft)	28 m (92 ft)	Fl W 10s.	16 nmi (30 km)	G0105	17744
Ponta das Cabecudas Lighthouse	Image	Itajaí; 26°55′35″S 48°37′21″W	n/a	6 m (20 ft)	58 m (190 ft)	Al Fl (2) W (1) R 30s.	white: 28 nmi (52 km) red: 23 nmi (43 km)	G0552	18794
Ponta das Conchas Lighthouse		Ilha do Mel; 25°32′21″S 48°17′27″W	1872	18 m (59 ft)	67 m (220 ft)	Fl W 10s.	25 nmi (46 km)	G0520	18724
Ponta de Castelhanos Lighthouse		Ilha Grande; 23°10′04″S 44°05′34″W	1901	16 m (52 ft)	121 m (397 ft)	Oc (3) W 10s.	27 nmi (50 km)	G0408	18472
Ponta de Guaratiba Lighthouse	Image	Ilha Rasa da Guaratiba; 23°04′53″S 43°33′45″W	n/a	8 m (26 ft)	42 m (138 ft)	Fl W 6s.	18 nmi (33 km)	G0404	18460
Ponta de Mucuripe Lighthouse	Old lighthouse	Fortaleza; 3°43′34″S 38°28′18″W	1958	22 m (72 ft)	85 m (279 ft)	Fl (2) W 10s.	43 nmi (80 km)	G0122	17768
Ponta de São Marcos Lighthouse	Image	São Luís; 2°29′19″S 44°18′07″W	1829 est.	18 m (59 ft)	36 m (118 ft)	Fl W 10s.	23 nmi (43 km)	G0084	17688
Ponta do Aracagi Lighthouse		Raposa; 2°27′02″S 44°08′54″W	1957	40 m (131 ft)	91 m (299 ft)	Fl (4) W 10s.	33 nmi (61 km)	G0090	17712
Ponta do Boi Lighthouse	Image	Ilhabela; 23°58′01″S 45°15′06″W	1900	17 m (56 ft)	70 m (230 ft)	L Fl W 10s.	22 nmi (41 km)	G0484	18616
Ponta do Mel Lighthouse		Areia Branca; 4°57′40″S 36°52′36″W	1898	14 m (46 ft)	106 m (348 ft)	L Fl W 30s.	41 nmi (76 km)	G0154	17816
Ponta do Retiro Lighthouse	Image	Ponta do Retiro; 21°21′05″S 40°57′52″W	n/a	30 m (98 ft)	40 m (131 ft)	Fl (3) W 15s.	23 nmi (43 km)	G0335.5	18330.5
Ponta do Varrido Lighthouse		Penha, Santa Catarina; 26°47′05″S 48°35′09″W	n/a	10 m (33 ft)	50 m (164 ft)	Fl W 6s.	18 nmi (33 km)	G0551	18784
Ponta dos Cajuais Lighthouse	Image	Icapuí; 4°42′14″S 37°22′13″W	n/a	14 m (46 ft)	64 m (210 ft)	Fl (3) W 15s.	19 nmi (35 km)	G0148	17808
Ponta dos Naufragados Lighthouse	Image	Ilha de Santa Catarina; 27°50′09″S 48°34′11″W	1861	10 m (33 ft)	43 m (141 ft)	Fl (2) W 15s.	18 nmi (33 km)	G0584	18888
Ponta Grossa Lighthouse		Ilhabela; 23°46′38″S 45°13′52″W	n/a	10 m (33 ft)	60 m (197 ft)	L Fl W 15s.	16 nmi (30 km)	G0468	18571
Ponta Marapanim Lighthouse	Image	Ilha do Algodoal; 0°34′49″S 47°35′05″W	1952	32 m (105 ft)	34 m (112 ft)	Fl (2) W 10s.	16 nmi (30 km)	G0063	17656
Ponta Maria Teresa Lighthouse		Vigia; 0°46′39″S 48°09′05″W	n/a	40 m (131 ft)	42 m (138 ft)	Fl W 6s.	15 nmi (28 km)	G0021	17556
Ponta Negra Lighthouse	Image	Maricá, Rio de Janeiro; 22°57′38″S 42°41′34″W	1909 est.	11 m (36 ft)	71 m (233 ft)	Fl (2) W 10s.	21 nmi (39 km)	G0356	18364
Ponta Paracuru Lighthouse	Image	Paracuru; 3°24′01″S 39°00′43″W	n/a	75 m (246 ft)	80 m (262 ft)	Fl W 10s.	27 nmi (50 km)	G0117	17766
Ponta Pecém Lighthouse	Image	Pecém; 3°32′59″S 38°49′06″W	n/a	30 m (98 ft)	75 m (246 ft)	Al Fl (2) W (1) R 30s.	white: 26 nmi (48 km) red: 21 nmi (39 km)	G0119	17766.5
Ponta Uchuria Lighthouse		Vila Velha; 20°19′25″S 40°17′14″W	n/a	5 m (16 ft)	7 m (23 ft)	Q R	16 nmi (30 km)	G0323	18272
Ponto do Guará Lighthouse		Macapá; 1°11′16″N 49°53′58″W	n/a	42 m (138 ft)	44 m (144 ft)	Fl W 6s.	16 nmi (30 km)	G0004	17470
Porto de Pedras Lighthouse	Image	Porto de Pedras; 9°09′24″S 35°17′53″W	1933 est.	36 m (118 ft)	90 m (295 ft)	Fl (2) W 15s.	24 nmi (44 km)	G0218	17968
Porto Seguro Lighthouse		Porto Seguro; 16°26′10″S 39°03′50″W	1907	12 m (39 ft)	57 m (187 ft)	Al Fl (2) W (1) R 30s.	white: 26 nmi (48 km) red: 21 nmi (39 km)	G0296	18176
Preguiças Lighthouse		Maranhão; 2.5933°S 42.7083°W	1940	35 m (115 ft)	46 m (151 ft)	Fl W 3s.	43 nmi (80 km)	G0094	17720
Quatipuru Lighthouse		Quatipuru; 0°42′51″S 46°57′47″W	n/a	25 m (82 ft)	27 m (89 ft)	Fl (3) W 15s.	15 nmi (28 km)	G0065	17662
Quissamã Lighthouse	Image	Quissamã; 22°09′42″S 41°17′50″W	n/a	40 m (131 ft)	40 m (131 ft)	L Fl W 10s.	17 nmi (31 km)	G0343	18342
Recife Lighthouse		Recife; 8°03′16″S 34°51′55″W	1822	18 m (59 ft)	20 m (66 ft)	Al Fl WR 12s.	white: 17 nmi (31 km) red: 13 nmi (24 km)	G0204	17920
Recife de Natal Lighthouse	Image	Natal; 5°45′06″S 35°11′41″W	n/a	10 m (33 ft)	13 m (43 ft)	Fl G 5s.	17 nmi (31 km)	G0178	17860
Rio Doce Lighthouse		Regência; 19°39′04″S 39°49′32″W	1997	46 m (151 ft)	42 m (138 ft)	Fl W 6s.	18 nmi (33 km)	G0316	18216
Salinópolis Lighthouse		Salinópolis; 0°36′57″S 47°21′24″W	1937	39 m (128 ft)	61 m (200 ft)	Fl W 6s.	46 nmi (85 km)	G0064	17660
Santa Isabel Lighthouse	Image	Barra dos Coqueiros; 10°49′40″S 36°56′07″W	n/a	31 m (102 ft)	68 m (223 ft)	Al Fl (2) W (1) R 30s.	white: 26 nmi (48 km) red: 21 nmi (39 km)	G0229.5	18004
Santa Luzia Lighthouse		Vila Velha; 20°19′28″S 40°16′03″W	1870	12 m (39 ft)	29 m (95 ft)	Fl (4) W 12s.	34 nmi (63 km)	G0320	18240
Santa Marta Lighthouse		Laguna, Santa Catarina; 28°36′15″S 48°48′50″W	1891	29 m (95 ft)	74 m (243 ft)	Oc WR 30s.	white: 46 nmi (85 km) red: 39 nmi (72 km)	G0600	18920
Santo Antonio da Barra Lighthouse		Barra; Salvador, Bahia; 13°00′37″S 38°31′58″W	1839	22 m (72 ft)	39 m (128 ft)	Al Iso (2) W (1) R 30s.	white: 38 nmi (70 km) red: 34 nmi (63 km)	G0242	18028
São Cristóvão Lighthouse	Image	São Cristóvão; 11°07′49″S 37°08′42″W	n/a	40 m (131 ft)	42 m (138 ft)	L Fl W 20s.	23 nmi (43 km)	G0233	18011
São Mateus Lighthouse	The old lighthouse	Conceição da Barra; 18°36′53″S 39°43′53″W	1999	7 m (23 ft)	14 m (46 ft)	Fl (2) W 15s.	15 nmi (28 km)	G0312	18213
São Thomé Lighthouse	Image	Campos dos Goytacazes; 22°02′32″S 41°03′11″W	1882	45 m (148 ft)	49 m (161 ft)	L Fl (2) W 67.5s.	40 nmi (74 km)	G0342	18340
Sarita Lighthouse	Image	Rio Grande do Sul; 32°37′45″S 52°25′43″W	1952	37 m (121 ft)	40 m (131 ft)	Fl (3) W 15s.	18 nmi (33 km)	G0636	19000
Sergipe Lighthouse		Aracaju; 10°58′11″S 37°02′10″W	n/a	40 m (131 ft)	41 m (135 ft)	Oc (6) W 60s.	39 nmi (72 km)	G0230	18010
Simão Grande Lighthouse		Soure; 0°15′24″S 48°24′07″W	n/a	40 m (131 ft)	42 m (138 ft)	Fl W 5s.	16 nmi (30 km)	G0014	17540
Solidão Lighthouse		Mostardas; 30°42′05″S 50°28′52″W	1949	21 m (69 ft)	24 m (79 ft)	Fl (2) W 12s.	15 nmi (28 km)	G0612	18948
Soure Lighthouse	Image	Soure; 0°44′32″S 48°30′22″W	1900 est.	30 m (98 ft)	35 m (115 ft)	Fl (2) W 10s.	16 nmi (30 km)	G0021.5	17560
Subaúma Lighthouse	Image	Subaúma; 12°14′24″S 37°46′23″W	1992	41 m (135 ft)	48 m (157 ft)	Fl W 10s.	23 nmi (43 km)	G0235	18014
Suçuraca Lighthouse		Urussuquara; 19°05′49″S 39°43′23″W	2002	40 m (131 ft)	64 m (210 ft)	Fl (2) W 30s.	24 nmi (44 km)	G0313.5	18214
Taipú Lighthouse		São Caetano de Odivelas; 0°39′43″S 48°02′38″W	n/a	30 m (98 ft)	39 m (128 ft)	Fl (3) W 15s.	16 nmi (30 km)	G0020	17552
Tamandaré Lighthouse	Image	Tamandaré; 8°45′29″S 35°05′59″W	~1930	22 m (72 ft)	27 m (89 ft)	Fl (3) W 10s.	18 nmi (33 km)	G0214	17964
Torres Lighthouse		Torres, Rio Grande do Sul; 29°20′43″S 49°43′44″W	1993	46 m (151 ft)	85 m (279 ft)	L Fl W 10s.	23 nmi (43 km)	G0604	18928
Tramandaí Lighthouse	Image	Tramandaí; 30°00′30″S 50°08′09″W	1954 est.	23 m (75 ft)	25 m (82 ft)	L Fl W 15s.	23 nmi (43 km)	G0607.4	18936
Ubatuba Lighthouse	Image	Ubatuba; 23°27′38″S 45°01′10″W	1932	3 m (10 ft)	65 m (213 ft)	Fl (3) W 10s.	16 nmi (30 km)	G0462	18560

== See also ==
- Lists of lighthouses and lightvessels
