= Cabo Frio Lighthouse =

Active lighthouse in Brazil

First lighthouse
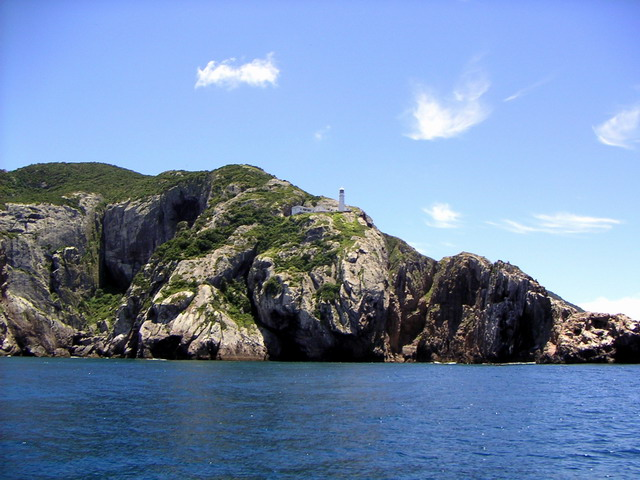
- Location: Ilha do Cabo Frio, Arraial do Cabo, Rio de Janeiro, Brazil
- Coordinates: 22°59′53″S 41°59′20″W

Tower
- Constructed: 1836
- Construction: stone
- Height: 5 m (16 ft)
- Shape: cylinder

Light
- First lit: 17 February 1836
- Deactivated: 1861
- Focal height: 395 m (1,296 ft)
- Lens: catoptric lens
- Second lighthouse
- Constructed: 1861
- Construction: stone (tower)
- Height: 16 m (52 ft)
- Shape: cylindrical tower with balcony and lantern
- First lit: 7 September 1861
- Deactivated: 1925
- Focal height: 159 m (522 ft)
- Lens: first order Fresnel lens (1893–), catoptric lens (–1893)
- Range: 20 nmi (37 km; 23 mi)
- Current lighthouse
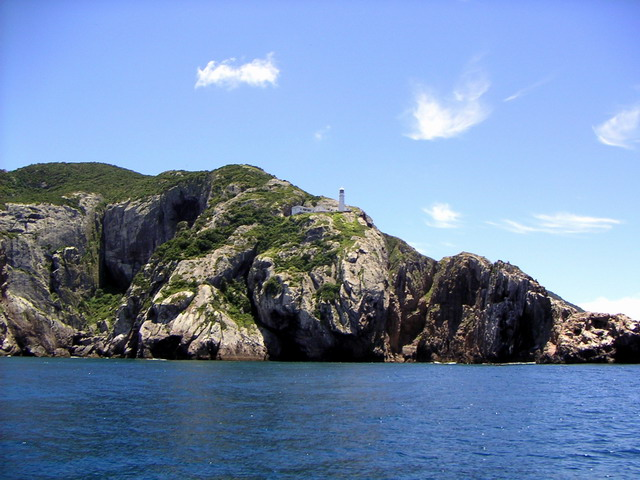
- Constructed: 1925
- Construction: cast iron (tower)
- Height: 16 m (52 ft)
- Shape: cylindrical tower with balcony and lantern
- Markings: White (tower), white (lantern)
- Operator: Brazilian Navy
- Focal height: 144 m (472 ft)
- Range: 49 nmi (91 km; 56 mi)
- Characteristic: Fl W 10s
- Brazil no.: BR-2400

Cabo Frio Lighthouse is an active lighthouse located on the southern point of the Ilha do Cabo Frio, called Focinho do Cabo, in the municipality of Arraial do Cabo, Brazil.

== History ==
The first lighthouse, a cylindrical stone tower 5 metres (16 ft) high, was lit on 17 February 1836 and was built on the highest hill of the island, at an altitude of 395 metres (1,296 ft). The lantern was equipped with catoptrics lens and parabolic reflectors lit by 18 oil lamps. As the top of the island was frequently covered by fog, due to the cold Antarctic currents, the lighthouse was not always operational. It was decided to build another lighthouse on the southern point of the island at a lower altitude.

The second lighthouse was a cylindrical stone tower, 15 metres (49 ft) high, with balcony and lantern and it was inaugurated on 7 September 1861. The lantern was equipped with catoptrics lens and it had a range of 20 nautical miles (37 km; 23 mi); in 1893 the equipment was changed with the 1st order of Fresnel lens built by Barbier, Benard, et Turenne.

The current lighthouse, built in 1926, is settled on a lower level respect to its nearby predecessor; it is a white cylindrical cast iron tower 16 metres (52 ft) high with balcony and lantern. The lantern emits a white flash every 10 seconds) visible up to 49 nautical miles (91 km; 56 mi). The lighthouse is managed by Brazilian Navy and is identified by the country code number BR-2400. Because of the difficulty of reaching the lighthouse from the pier, an helipad was built nearby the keeper's housing.

== See also ==
List of lighthouses in Brazil
