= Barra Rio Grande Lighthouse =

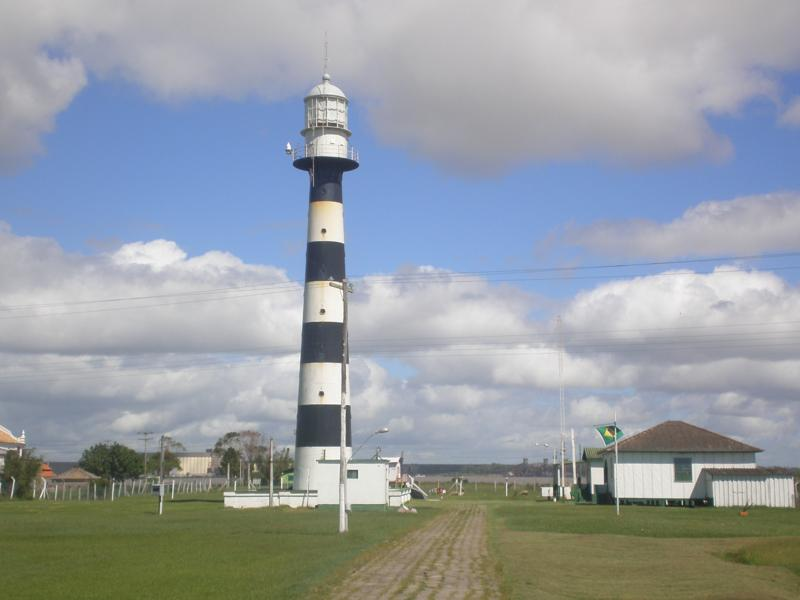
- Location: São José do Norte; Rio Grande do Sul; Brazil
- Coordinates: 32°07′04″S 52°04′37″W

Tower
- Constructed: 1820 (first); 1842 (second)
- Foundation: concrete base
- Construction: cast iron tower
- Height: 31 metres (102 ft)
- Shape: cylindrical tower with balcony and lantern
- Markings: black and white horizontal band tower, white lantern
- Operator: Brazilian Navy
- Racon: K

Light
- First lit: 1852 (current)
- Deactivated: 1842 (first); 1852 (second)
- Focal height: 32 metres (105 ft)
- Light source: main power
- Range: 30 nautical miles (56 km; 35 mi)
- Characteristic: Oc (6) W 21s.
- Brazil no.: BR-4008

Barra Rio Grande Lighthouse is an active lighthouse located on a sandy strip between the Lagoa dos Patos and the South Atlantic Ocean in the municipality of São José do Norte, Brazil.

== History ==
The first lighthouse, a lantern atop the tower of the Commander of the Port, was established since 1 December 1820, but went out of order at the first storm. Since then a fire was lit in order to direct safely the ships to the harbour. In 1827 was asked to Pedro I of Brazil to rebuild the lighthouse, only on 2 August 1842 it was relit. In 1847 a new cylindrical prefabricated cast iron lighthouse, 31 metres (102 ft) high, was commissioned in London and on 18 January 1852 was lit. At first the lantern was equipped with a catoptrics system replaced in 1886 by a 2nd order of Fresnel lens built by Barbier and Fenestre. The lighthouse was painted in red, then in dark red and at last with black and white horizontal bands. The lantern emits a white occulting light (Oc (6) W 21 seconds) visible up to 30 nautical miles (56 km; 35 mi). The lighthouse is managed by Brazilian Navy and is identified by the country code number BR-4008.

== See also ==
List of lighthouses in Brazil
