= Ilha da Moela Lighthouse =

- Location: Ilha da Moela; Guarujá; Brazil
- Coordinates: 24°03′02″S 46°15′48″W

Tower
- Constructed: 1830 (first)
- Foundation: masonry base
- Construction: masonry tower
- Height: 10 metres (33 ft) (current); 9.5 metres (31 ft) (first)
- Shape: large cylindrical tower with balcony and lantern
- Markings: white tower and lantern
- Power source: diesel engine
- Operator: Brazilian Navy

Light
- First lit: 1895 (current)
- Deactivated: 1895 (first)
- Focal height: 110 metres (360 ft) (current); 102 metres (335 ft) (first)
- Range: white: 40 nautical miles (74 km; 46 mi) (current) red: 39 nautical miles (72 km; 45 mi) (current); 19 nautical miles (35 km; 22 mi) (first)
- Characteristic: Al Oc WR 60s.
- Brazil no.: BR-3288

Ilha da Moela Lighthouse (Portuguese: Farol da Ilha da Moela) is an active lighthouse on the namesake island 1.84 kilometres (1.14 mi) from Ponta do Munduba at the entrance of Santos Bay, Brazil. Ilha da Moela Lighthouse is the oldest lighthouse on the State of São Paulo coast and the entire island is a Brazilian Navy base.

== History ==
The first lighthouse, lit on July 31, 1830, was a white masonry cylindrical tower, 9.5 metres (31 ft) high, with balcony and lantern. The lantern was equipped with a white fixed light catoptrics equipment built by Barbier, Benard, et Turenne with a range of 19 nautical miles (35 km; 22 mi). A new torch was installed in 1862 to accommodate a new 1st order of Fresnel lens built by BBT.

On May 13, 1895, a new tower entered in service, and it is still in use; it is a masonry white tower, 10 metres (33 ft) high, with balcony and lantern and a focal height of 110 metres (360 ft). In 1953 the lighthouse underwent restoration works; the lantern was equipped with four focus lenses and four common lenses: two white and two red each. The lighthouse emits an alternate occulting light white or red every 60 seconds) visible up to 40 nautical miles (74 km; 46 mi) for the white light and 39 nautical miles (72 km; 45 mi) for the red. The lighthouse is managed by Brazilian Navy and is identified by the country code number BR-3288.

== See also ==
List of lighthouses in Brazil
