= Arraial do Cabo Marine Extractive Reserve =

Protected area in Rio de Janeiro, Brazil

- Reserva Extrativista Marinha do Arraial do Cabo
- IUCN category VI (protected area with sustainable use of natural resources)
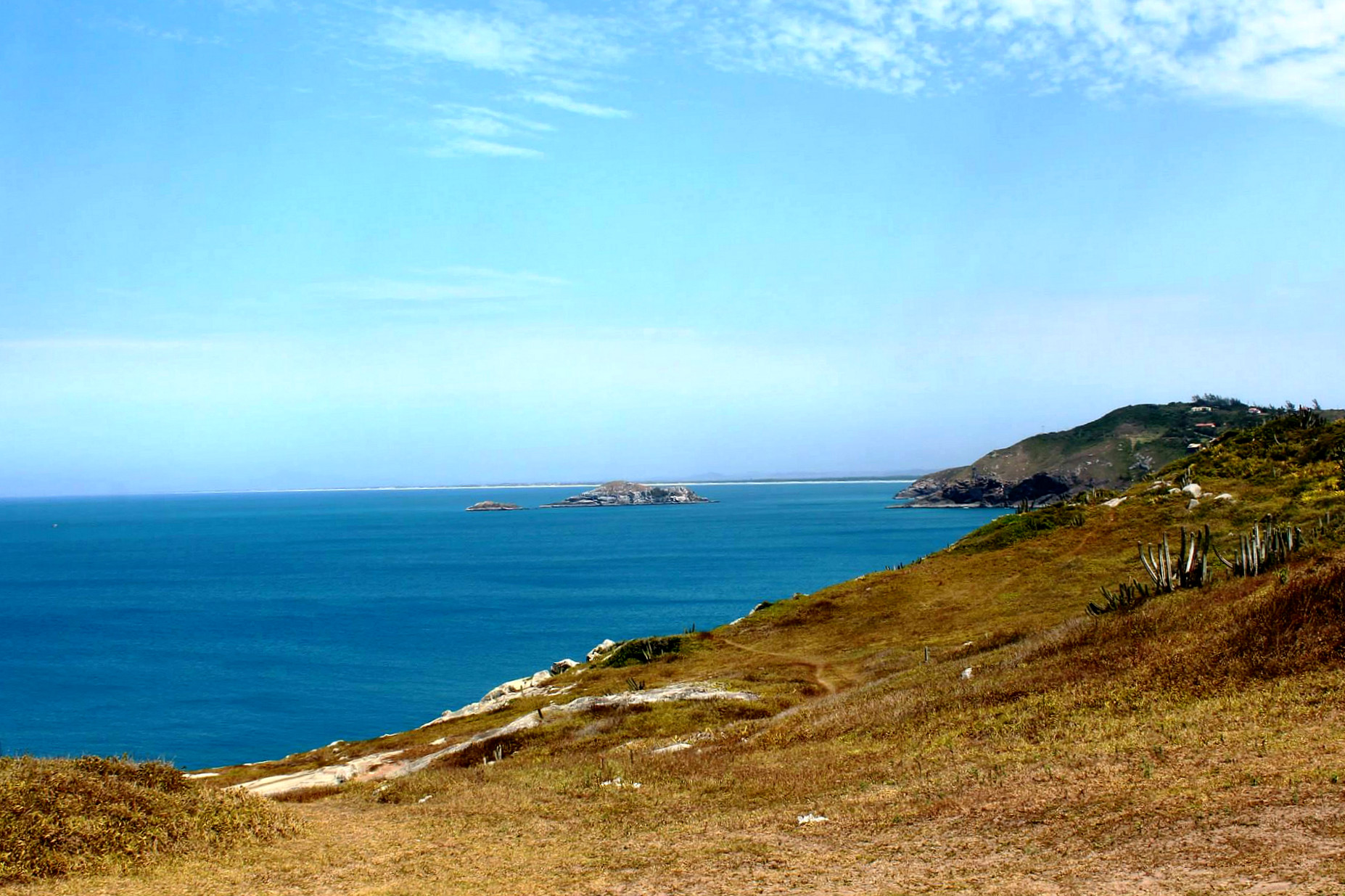
- Costão do Atalaia in the reserve

- Location within Brazil
- Nearest city: Arraial do Cabo, Rio de Janeiro
- Coordinates: 23.007666°S 42.117633°W
- Area: 56,769 hectares (140,280 acres)
- Designation: Extractive reserve
- Created: 3 January 1997
- Administrator: Chico Mendes Institute for Biodiversity Conservation

The Arraial do Cabo Marine Extractive Reserve (Portuguese: Reserva Extrativista Marinha do Arraial do Cabo) is a coastal marine Extractive reserve in the state of Rio de Janeiro, Brazil.

== Location ==
The Arraial do Cabo Marine Extractive Reserve is in the municipality of Arraial do Cabo, Rio de Janeiro. It has an area of 56,769 hectares (140,280 acres). The reserve covers a rectangular area that includes the town of Arraial do Cabo and part of the bar of land extending to the east of the town between the Araruama Lagoon and the ocean, as well as a section of the ocean to the south of the bar and to the south and east of the town.

== Environment ==
The reserve is in the Cabo Frio region of Rio de Janeiro state, which includes the municipalities of Arraial do Cabo and Cabo Frio. It is in a flat region with small elevations, with dunes along the coast, broken by rocky headlands, islands and stretches of beach. The Saquarema and Araruama lagoon systems and the almost intact Restinga da Massambaba sandbank are important features. The region benefits from an upswelling of cold water originating in the polar region that is high in nutrients. The water is clear and supports a large population of fish.

Protected species in the reserve include the Barber goby (Elacatinus figaro), sea ginger (Millepora alcicornis), the sea urchin Paracentrotus gaimardi, the gorgonian Phyllogorgia dilatata, sperm whale (Physeter macrocephalus) and royal tern (Thalasseus maximus).

== Economy ==
As of 2002 the municipality had a population of 23,877 inhabitants, with about 300 registered fishing families who had been fishing in the region for over 100 years. Within the reserve only traditional fishing vessels are allowed according to the utilisation plan, which aims for sustainable use of the marine fauna, as well as tourism and leisure activities. A variety of methods are used to catch fish including line fishing, small trawlers and underwater octopus hunting. A 2004 study showed that the local fishermen are well-informed about the biodiversity of the region and the different uses for the different species. Since the mid-1990s there has been rapid and uncontrolled growth of tourism, leading to conflicts between the artisanal fishermen and the companies operating tour boats and organising diving.

== History ==
The Arraial do Cabo Marine Extractive Reserve was established by federal decree on 3 January 1997. It is administered by the Chico Mendes Institute for Biodiversity Conservation (ICMBio). It is classed as IUCN protected area category VI (protected area with sustainable use of natural resources). An extractive reserve is an area used by traditional extractive populations whose livelihood is based on extraction, subsistence agriculture and small-scale animal raising. Its basic objectives are to protect the livelihoods and culture of these people and to ensure sustainable use of natural resources.

The utilisation plan was approved by the Brazilian Institute of Environment and Renewable Natural Resources (IBAMA) on 18 February 1999. The deliberative council was created on 27 August 2010. On 6 November 2013 the families in the reserve were given access to PRONAF support. Standards for sustainable squid fishing were defined on 29 January 2014.

== Sources ==
- Fonseca-KruelI, Viviane Stern da; Peixoto, Ariane Luna (January–March 2004), "Etnobotânica na Reserva Extrativista Marinha de Arraial do Cabo, RJ, Brasil" (PDF), Acta Botanica Brasilica (in Portuguese), 18 (1), São Paulo, ISSN 1677-941X
- Resex Marinha do Arraial do Cabo (in Portuguese), ICMBio: Chico Mendes Institute for Biodiversity Conservation
- RESEX Marinha do Arraial do Cabo (in Portuguese), ISA: Instituto Socioambiental
- Unidade de Conservação: Reserva Extrativista Marinha Arraial do Cabo (in Portuguese), MMA: Ministério do Meio Ambiente
- Vinha, Valéria G. da; May, Peter; Caldasso, Liandra Peres (2008), Sustentabilidade da Reserva Extrativista Marinha de Arraial do Cabo, RJ: técnicas de pesquisa e resultados (PDF) (in Portuguese)
