= Preguiças Lighthouse =

Preguiças Lighthouse Mandacaru
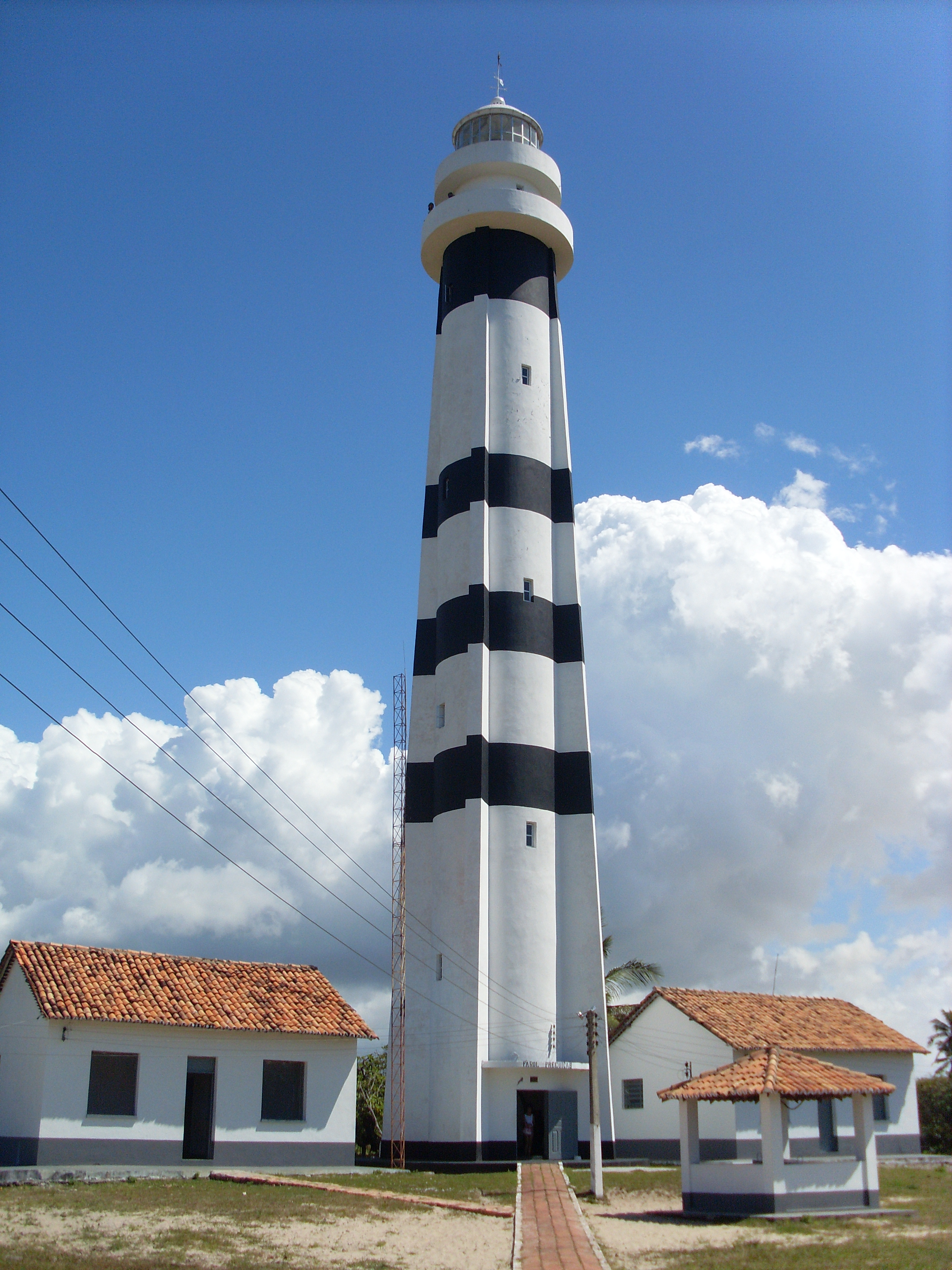
- Lighthouse and keeper's quarters
- Location: Maranhão; Brazil
- Coordinates: 2°35′30.0″S 42°42′24.0″W

Tower
- Constructed: 1909 (first)
- Construction: reinforced concrete tower
- Height: 35 metres (115 ft)
- Shape: tapered cylindrical tower with four ribs, double balcony and lantern
- Markings: white tower with four horizontal black bands

Light
- First lit: 1940 (current)
- Focal height: 46 metres (151 ft)
- Lens: 3rd order Fresnel lens
- Range: 43 nautical miles (80 km; 49 mi)
- Characteristic: Fl W 3s.
- Brazil no.: BR-0808

Preguiças Lighthouse also called Mandacaru Lighthouse is a lighthouse in Maranhão, Brazil.

White truncated conical concrete tower, four black bands, four ribs, double gallery.

It is situated in the village Mandacaru on the banks of the Preguiças River, within the Lençois National Park. The nearest town is Barreirinhas, head of district. Built in 1940, it is still inhabited and visitable every Tuesday, Thursday and Sunday.

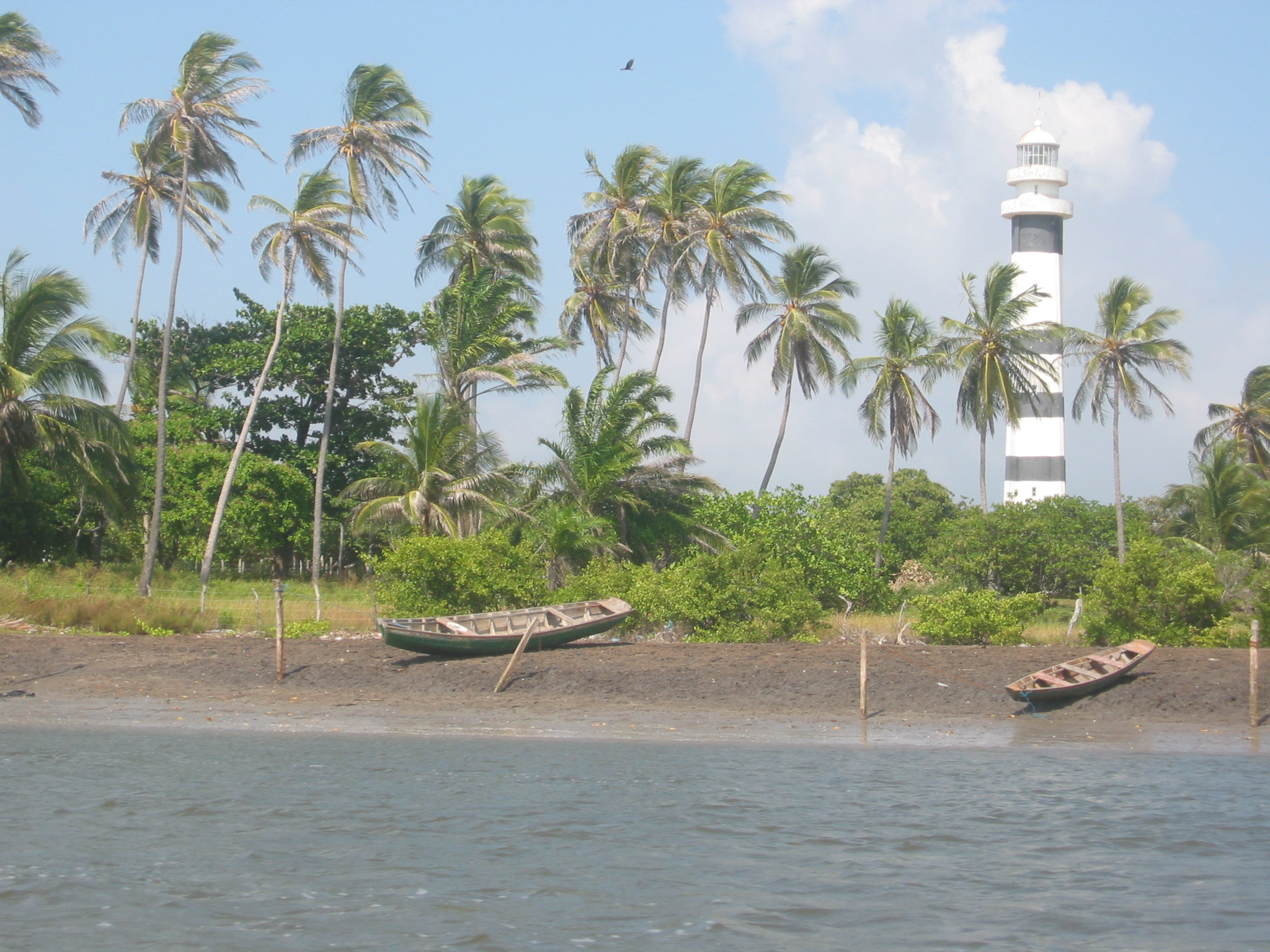
Viewed from the Preguiças River

== See also ==
- List of lighthouses in Brazil
