= Ilha de Santana Lighthouse =

Ilha de Santana Lighthouses Farol da Ilha de Santana
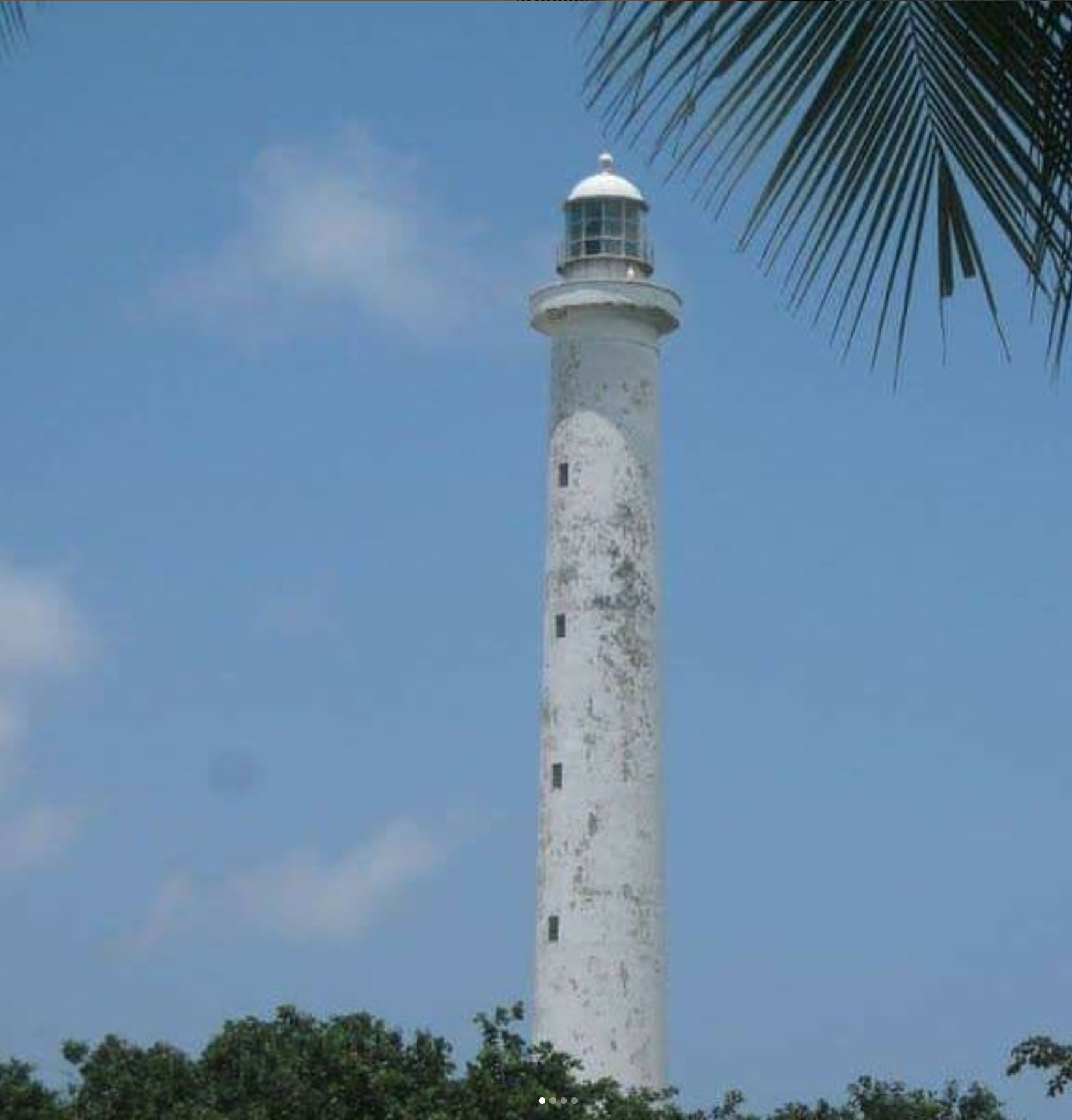
- Location: Ilha de Santana, Maranhão, Brazil
- Coordinates: 2°16′14″S 43°37′26″W
- First lighthouse
- Constructed: 1831
- Construction: masonry (tower)
- Height: 31 m (102 ft)
- First lit: 1 June 1831
- Deactivated: 1861
- Range: 18 nmi (33 km; 21 mi)
- Second lighthouse
- Constructed: 1861
- Construction: masonry (tower)
- Height: 26 m (85 ft)
- Shape: square
- First lit: 26 January 1961
- Deactivated: 1883
- Third lighthouse
- Constructed: 1883
- Construction: cast iron
- Height: 42 m (138 ft)
- Shape: skeletal pyramidal tower with central cylinder atop a 2-storey cylindrical cast iron base
- First lit: 2 December 1883
- Deactivated: 1964
- Focal height: 46 m (151 ft)
- Lens: second order Fresnel lens
- Ilha de Santana Lighthouse
- Constructed: 1964
- Construction: concrete
- Height: 49 m (161 ft)
- Shape: tapered cylindrical tower with balcony and lantern
- Markings: White (tower), white (lantern)
- Operator: Brazilian Navy
- Racon: B
- First lit: 1 July 1964
- Focal height: 57 m (187 ft)
- Range: 31 nmi (57 km; 36 mi) (white), 25 nmi (46 km; 29 mi) (red)
- Characteristic: Al Fl(2) W (1) R 51s
- Brazil no.: BR-0804

Ilha de Santana Lighthouse (Portuguese: Farol da Ilha de Santana) is an active lighthouse on the namesake island located at the east entrance of the Baía de São Marcos, Maranhão, Brazil

== Description ==
The first lighthouse was lit on June 1, 1831, though the construction has been authorized since June 1822. The masonry tower was built in three years, close to the beach in a place without stone; it was 31 metres (102 ft) high and the lantern was equipped with a rotating catoptrics lens with a range of 18 nautical miles (33 km; 21 mi). Soon after the lighthouse was threatened by the sea erosion and the efforts made to save it were unsuccessfully.

It was decided to build a new lighthouse far away; it had a quadrangular shape and a height of 26 metres (85 ft). The original rotating system was transferred on the new lighthouse which was lit on January 26, 1961. Years later the sea erosion was damaging the second lighthouse, therefore a third lighthouse was built. It was built a cast iron pyramidal skeletal tower prefabricated in England by Armstrong, Mitchell and Company. The new white painted lighthouse was lit on December 2, 1883, and the lantern was equipped with a 2nd order of Fresnel lens, built by Chance Brothers, emitting a white and red light. With the passing of the years the cast iron tower underwent a progressive deteriorating, caused by the rust, and the construction of a new lighthouse was essential.

The current cylindrical tower was built in concrete, with balcony and lantern by side the former; it has a height of 49 metres (161 ft) and was lit on July 1, 1964. The lantern and the optical device were moved from the old lighthouse to the new one. The cast iron tower was partially dismantled and few years ago was completely demolished. The lighthouse emits two long alternate white flashes and one red every 51 seconds visible up to 31 nautical miles (57 km; 36 mi) for the white light and 25 nautical miles (46 km; 29 mi) for that red. The lighthouse is managed by Brazilian Navy and is identified by the country code number BR-0804.

== See also ==
List of lighthouses in Brazil
