= Albardão Lighthouse =

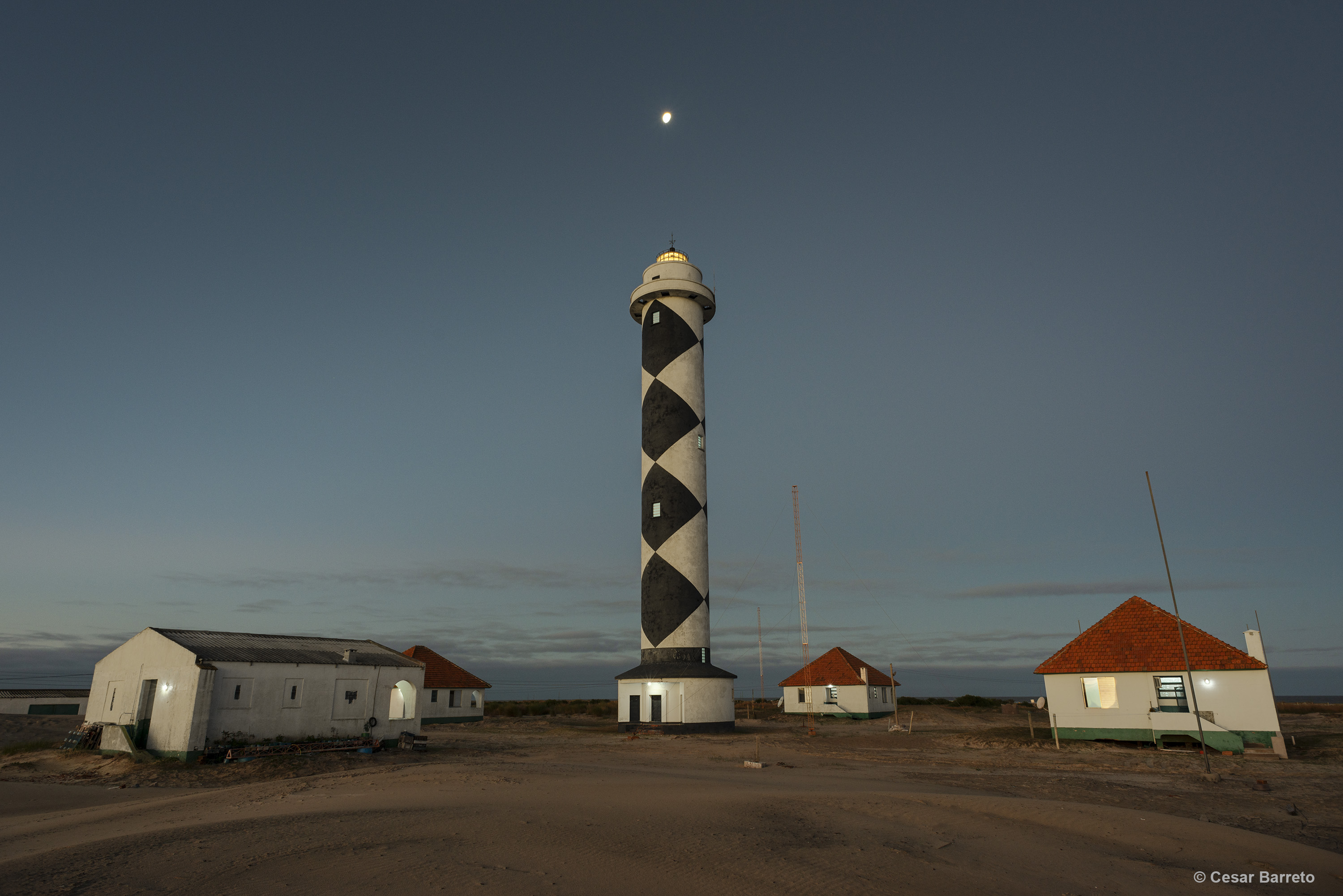
- Location: Santa Vitória do Palmar; Brazil
- Coordinates: 33°12′09″S 52°42′22″W

Tower
- Constructed: 1909 (first)
- Foundation: concrete base (first and current)
- Construction: concrete tower (current) cast iron tower (first)
- Height: 44 metres (144 ft) (current); 35 metres (115 ft) (first)
- Shape: cylindrical tower with balcony and lantern atop a 1-storey workshop (current)
- Markings: white and black rhomboid shape painted tower (current) dark red tower (first)
- Operator: Brazilian Navy
- Racon: X

Light
- First lit: 1948 (current)
- Deactivated: 1948 (first)
- Focal height: 50 metres (160 ft)
- Light source: main power
- Range: 42 nautical miles (78 km; 48 mi)
- Characteristic: Fl (4) W 25s.
- Brazil no.: BR-4656

Albardão Lighthouse is an active lighthouse located on a sandy strip known as Praia do Cassino, in the municipality of Santa Vitória do Palmar, Brazil on the South Atlantic Ocean; the lighthouse is one of the southernmost Brazilian lights.

== History ==
The first lighthouse at this location was lit on May 3, 1909, and was a cast iron tower 35 metres (115 ft) high. It was painted in dark red and equipped with a 3rd order dioptre lens having a range of 18 nautical miles (33 km; 21 mi). The current lighthouse was built on project of Ernst Schaffer by the Christiani-Nielsen builder in 1948. It is a concrete tower 44 metres (144 ft) high with balcony and lantern painted in white and black rhomboid shape. The light is equipped with Barbier, Benard, et Turenne third order Fresnel lens and emits four white flashes every 25 seconds visible up to 42 nautical miles (78 km; 48 mi). The lighthouse is managed by Brazilian Navy and is identified by the country code number BR-4656.

Albardão Lighthouse is located in Hermenegildo Beach
