= Battle of São José do Norte =

Battle of the Ragamuffin War

- Part of the Ragamuffin War
Date	16 July 1840
Location	São José do Norte, Rio Grande do Sul, Empire of Brazil 32°00′54″S 52°02′31″W
Result	Imperial victory

Belligerents
Piratini Republic	Empire of Brazil

Commanders and leaders
Bento Gonçalves; C. de Carvalho; Giuseppe Garibaldi	Antonio Soares de Paiva (WIA); Gama Rosa

Strength
1,200 men	599 men (later reinforced); 1 launch

Casualties and losses
349: 181 dead 150 wounded 18 captured	159: 72 dead 87 wounded

The Battle of São José do Norte was a battle of the Ragamuffin War, fought by loyalist Imperial forces under Antonio Soares de Paiva, and Riograndense troops under Bento Gonçalves. The ragamuffin troops attacked São José do Norte's garrison, aiming to capture a port for their republic, but were repealed with heavy losses after the Imperials were reinforced.

== Background ==
In November 1839, with the Recapture of Laguna, the Juliana Republic was crushed. This meant that, once again, the Riograndense Republic had no access to the sea, something very troublesome for its economy. Furthermore, their only regional ally, Fructuoso Rivera's Uruguay, did little to help them economically and militarily.

The rebels had been besieging Porto Alegre, the regional capital, since June 1838. This helped tie down the Imperial troops in the province, while the besiegers felt greater freedom to move around the region and take Imperial positions by surprise, or help defend their own when needed.

== Engagement ==
Bento Gonçalves marched 1,200 men from the siege to São José do Norte, a town in the southern coast of Rio Grande do Sul which they believed to be weakly held. When they arrived, at one in the morning, they did only meet a force of only 599 national guardsmen under Colonel Antonio Soares de Paiva, together with the launch Torres, but these were, only an hour later, reinforced by troops coming from the garrison of nearby Rio Grande.

After 9 hours of bloody close-quarters fighting under torrential rain,, with their soldiers disorganizedly looting the city and being counterattacked by Imperial forces, the rebels withdrew, ostensively in order not to harm the town's population any further. Giuseppe Garibaldi had proposed to burn down the city in order to take it, something Gonçalves refused to do. The powder storage in one of the forts they had captured in the beginning of the battle blew up, killing many of their men. They had over 300 casualties, to the Imperials' little more than 200. Four days after the battle, Paiva sent down medical supplies to the ragamuffin encampment, something Gonçalves paid back by freeing the prisoners they'd taken during the battle.
