= Ilha Rasa Lighthouse =

Farol da Ilha Rasa
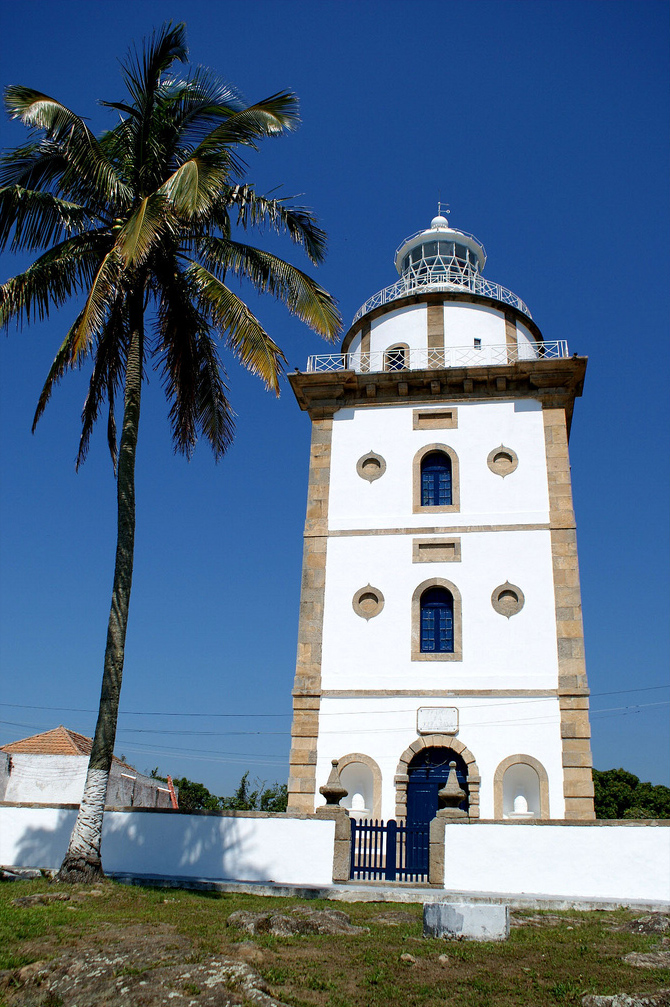
- Location: Ilha Rasa
- Coordinates: 23°03′50″S 43°08′45″W

Tower
- Constructed: 1829
- Foundation: stone base
- Construction: stone tower
- Height: 26 metres (85 ft)
- Shape: cylindrical tower with balcony and lantern atop a massive square tower
- Markings: white tower with brown trim
- Operator: Brazilian Navy

Light
- Focal height: 101 metres (331 ft)
- Lens: meso-radial Fresnel lens
- Range: white: 51 nautical miles (94 km; 59 mi) red: 45 nautical miles (83 km; 52 mi)
- Characteristic: Al Fl (2) W (1) R 15s.
- Brazil no.: BR-2420

Ilha Rasa Lighthouse (Portuguese: Farol da Ilha Rasa) is an active lighthouse on the namesake island located 11 kilometres (6.8 mi) from Guanabara Bay, Rio de Janeiro, Brazil.

== History ==
Before the construction of the lighthouse, a fire was lit every night on the summit of Ilha Rasa signaling the entrance to the Port of Rio de Janeiro. King João VI of Portugal decided on the construction of the lighthouse on the island and the works began in 1819, employing prisoners as the workforce, under the supervision of the engineer João de Souza Pacheco Leitão. The tower was completed in 1825, but its inauguration was postponed because Argentine pirates attacked the ship transporting the optical instruments from France where they had been produced.

The lighthouse was lit on July 31, 1829. It is a 3-story square prism stone building surmounted by a cylindrical tower with balcony and lantern. The tower, painted in white with brown trim, is 26 metres (85 ft) high and the walls are 1.3 metres (4.3 ft) thick. The lantern was equipped with a first-order rotary catoptrics system and three parabolic reflectors lit by 21 lamps burning rapeseed oil. On December 2, 1883, a new first-order Doppler lens, manufactured by Lepaute et Sautter & Lemonnier and installed by engineer Louis Belenot, was inaugurated.

The lantern is currently equipped with one of the two mesoradial lenses built in 1909. Since 1951 it has operated with electric power supplied by diesel engines. The lighthouse emits two white alternate flashes and one red every 15 seconds visible up to 51 nautical miles (94 km; 59 mi) for the white light and 45 nautical miles (83 km; 52 mi) for that red. The lighthouse is managed by the Brazilian Navy and is identified by the country code number BR-2420.

== See also ==
List of lighthouses in Brazil
