= Araranguá Lighthouse =

Araranguá Morros dos Conventos
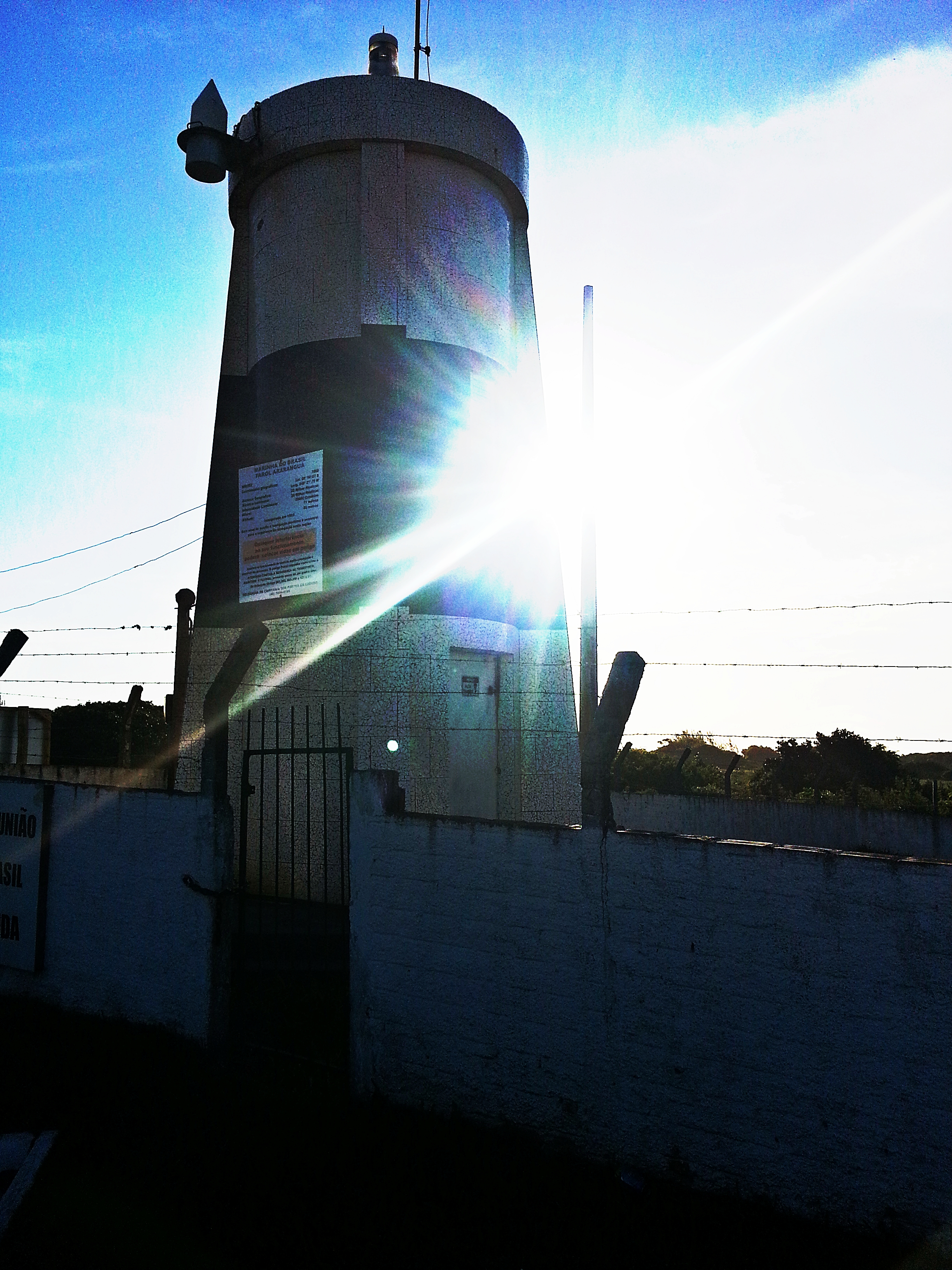
- Location: Araranguá; Brazil
- Coordinates: 28°56′05″S 49°21′45″W

Tower
- Constructed: 1953
- Foundation: concrete base
- Construction: concrete and skeletal tower
- Height: 8 metres (26 ft)
- Shape: skeletal tower atop a cylindrical tower with four buttresses
- Markings: white concrete tower with a horizontal black band

Light
- Focal height: 85 metres (279 ft)
- Range: 25 nautical miles (46 km; 29 mi)
- Characteristic: Fl (3) W 20s.
- Brazil no.: BR-3960

Araranguá Lighthouse is an active lighthouse in Araranguá, Brazil on the Atlantic Ocean.

== History ==
It was built in 1953 on a rocky bluff named Morros dos Conventos nearby the beach. The lighthouse is a cylindrical concrete tower with four buttresses surmounted by a metal skeletal tower with the lantern on the top. The tower is white painted with a black horizontal band. The light emits three white flashes, at 3.3 seconds interval, every twenty seconds visible up to 25 nautical miles (46 km; 29 mi). The lighthouse is managed by Brazilian Navy and is identified by the country code number BR-3960.

== See also ==
- List of lighthouses in Brazil
