= São Thomé Lighthouse =

São Thomé
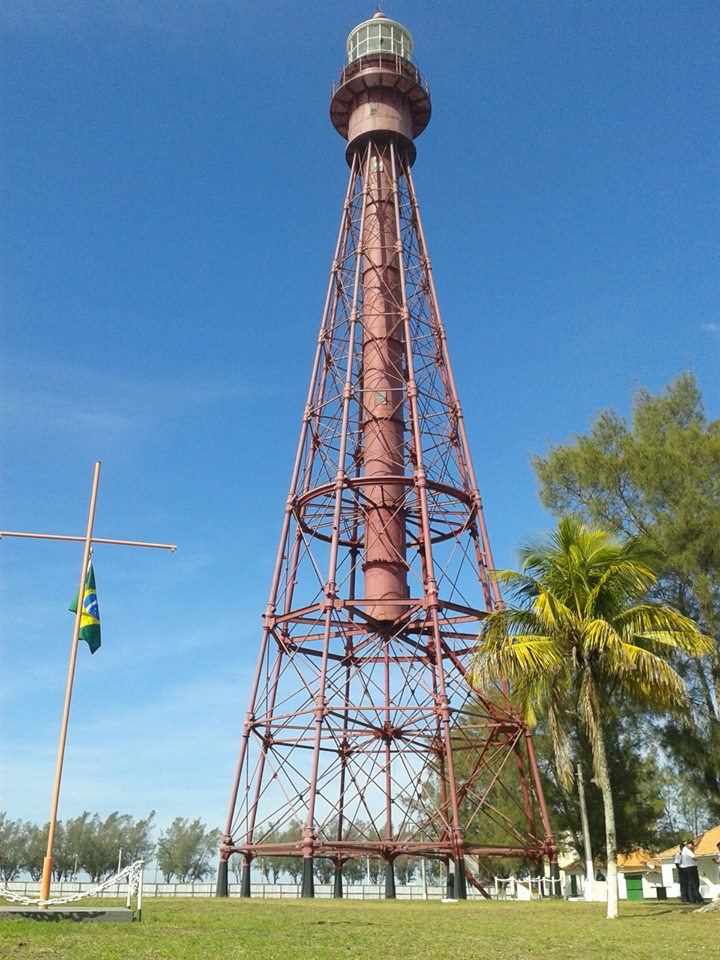
- São Thomé Lighthouse
- Location: Campos dos Goytacazes, Rio de Janeiro
- Coordinates: 22°02′32″S 41°03′11″W

Tower
- Constructed: 29 July 1882
- Foundation: 1882
- Height: 45 metres (148 ft)
- Racon: 0

Light
- Focal height: 49 metres (161 ft)
- Range: 40 nautical miles (74 km; 46 mi)
- Characteristic: L Fl (2) W 67.5s.

São Thomé Lighthouse is located in Praia do Farol (Lighthouse Beach), in the Brazilian municipality of Campos dos Goytacazes, Rio de Janeiro.

== History ==
The work was designed by the French company Barbier & Fenestre, and it was based on the openwork lighthouse design of Swedish engineer Nils Gustaf von Heidenstam, who used pull rods and tension bars to create this innovative model for a stable iron frame structure. The first of its kind was the Pater Noster lighthouse, built on Haneskär Island in Sweden.

The monument was built by a French firm in the year 1877. Its inauguration was in 1882, commemorating the birthday of Princess Isabel. It was made of a special corrosion resistant iron, which is why it is still in good condition. The lantern was surrounded by glass pane and fitted with a 3-centimeter-thick glass lens with a 1 kW bulb, and emitted 8 fan-shaped lanes of light reaching 25 miles or so. In 1967, there was a fire in the lantern and the headlight was replaced by a lower one, and its range was reduced to 19 miles (31 km).

At the time of its inauguration, it worked kerosene, but currently it works with commercial electric power, but it has 2 generators and can still run the kerosene as originally, if necessary. It lights up according to sunset time and makes the full turn in 68 seconds. During World War II, this area served to land helicopters for supply when they traveled to the coasts of the region.

== See also ==
- List of lighthouses in Brazil
