= Arraial do Cabo =

- Municipality
- Municipality of Arraial do Cabo
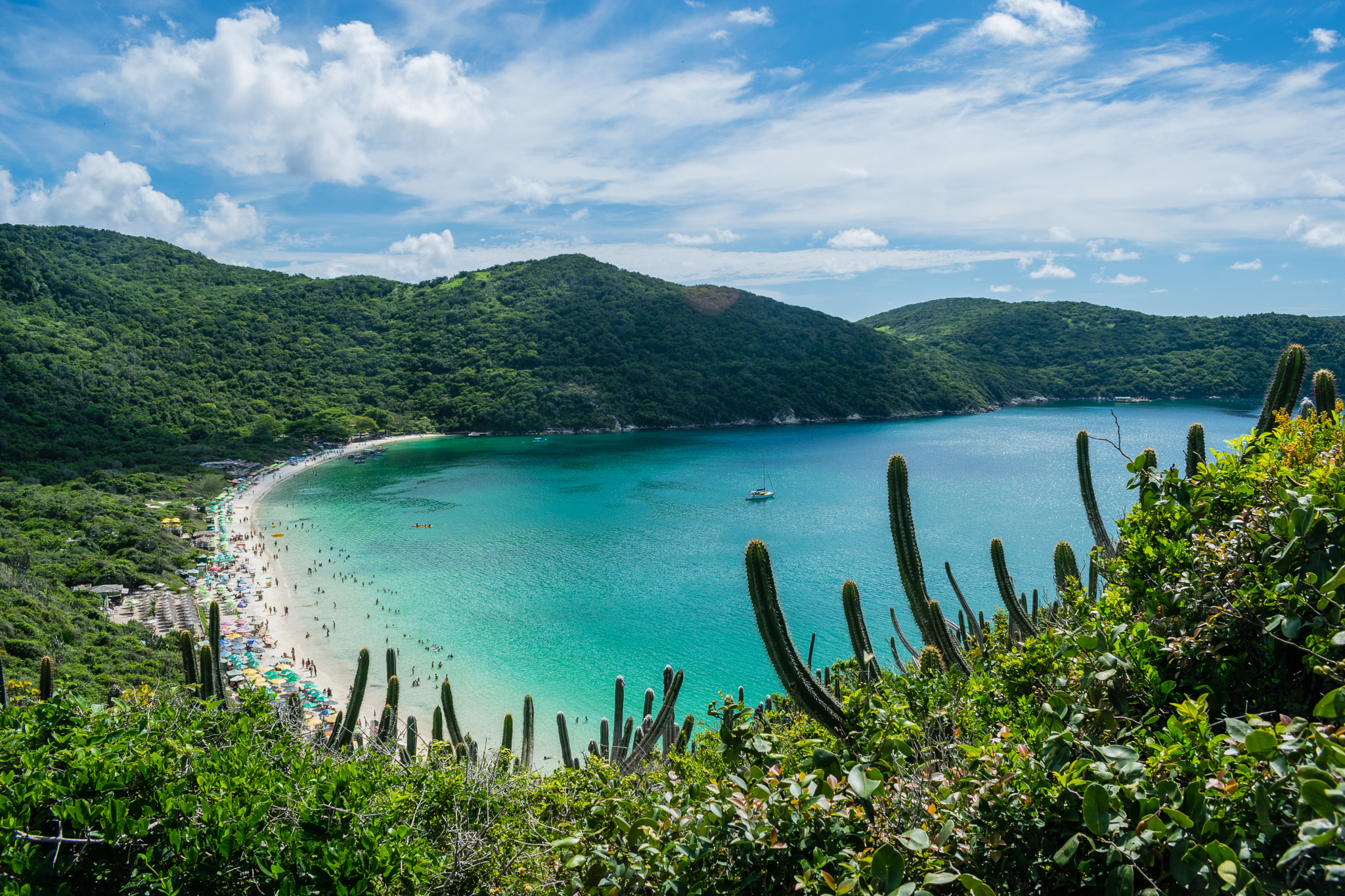
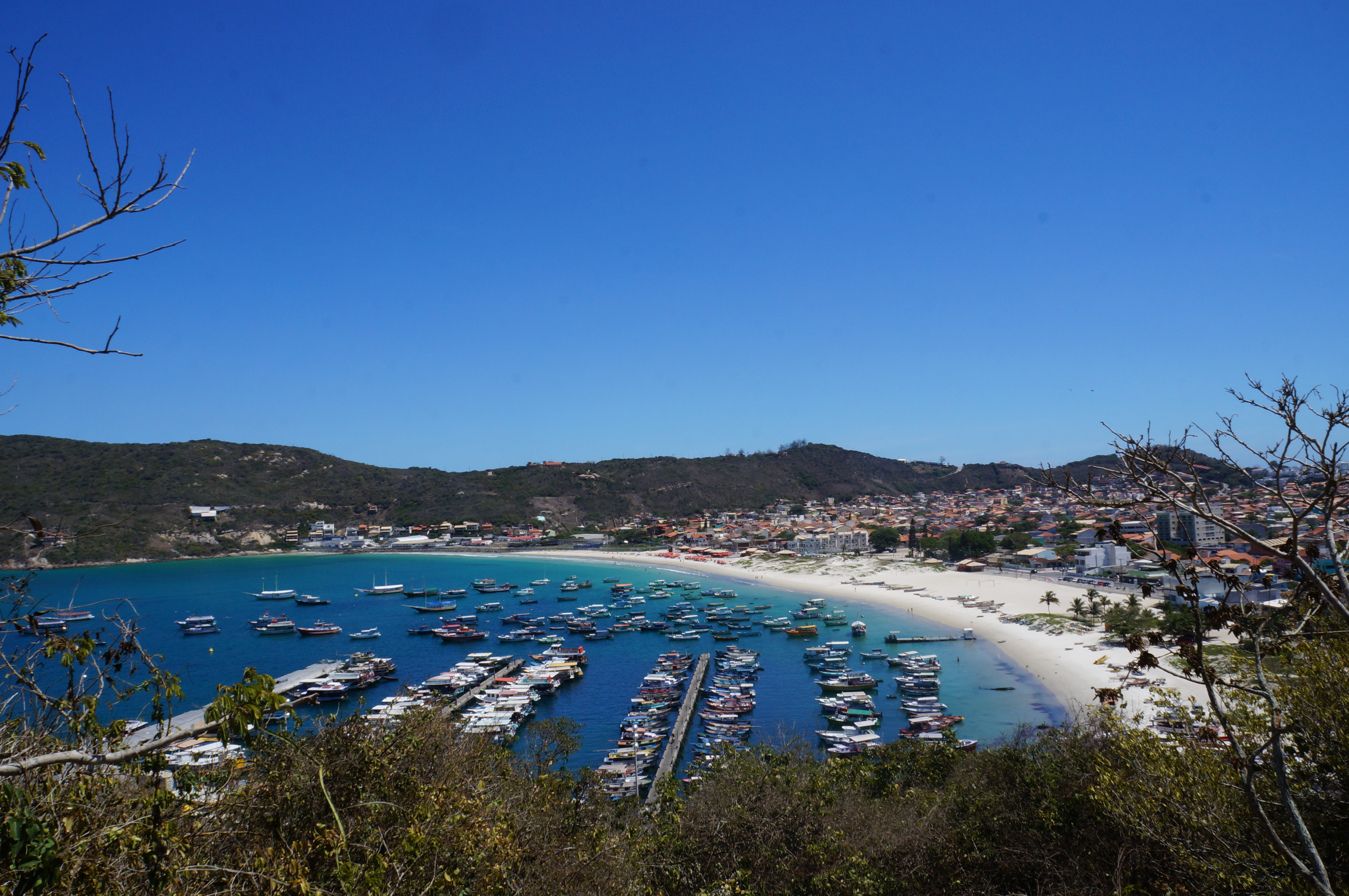
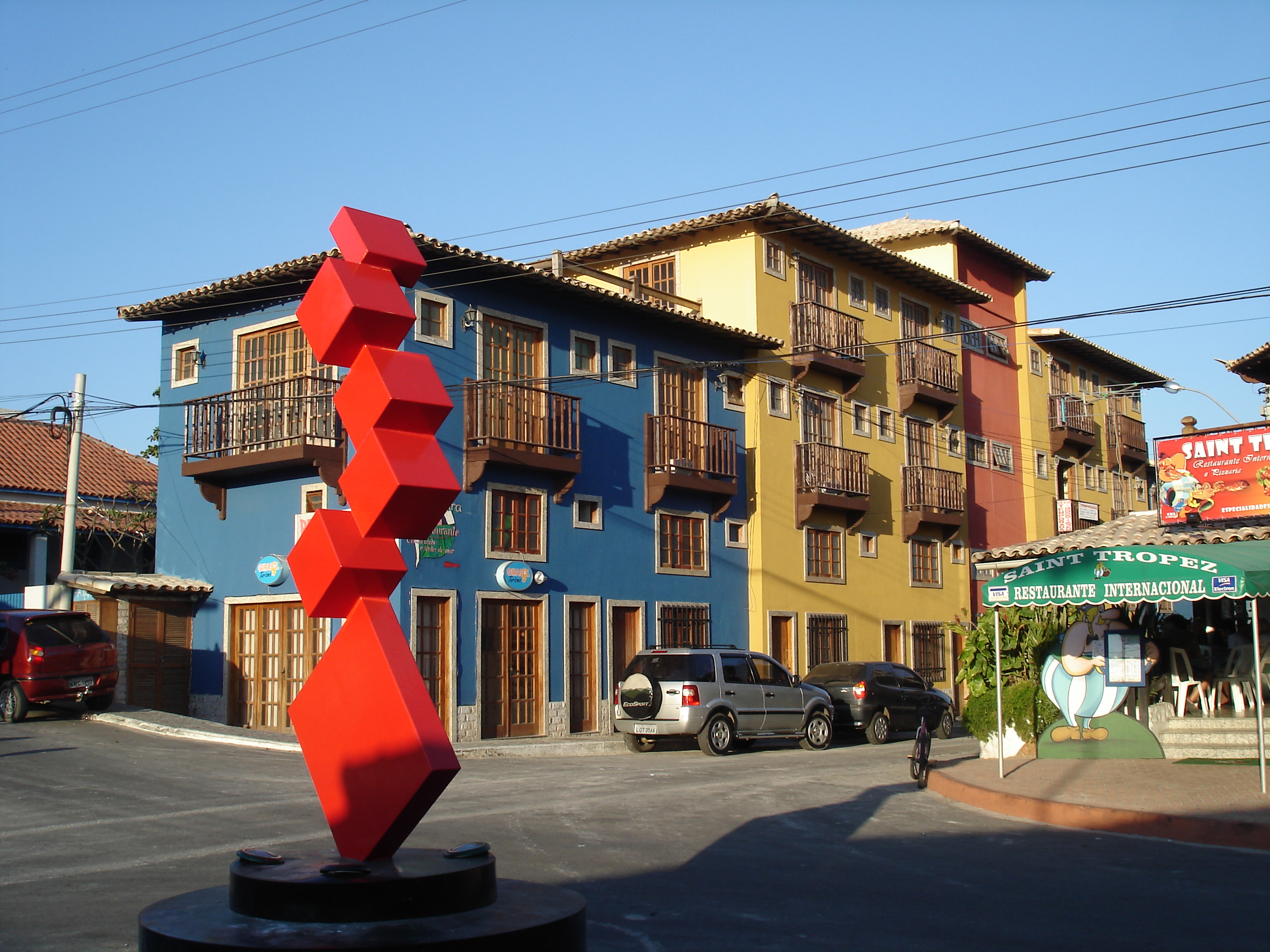
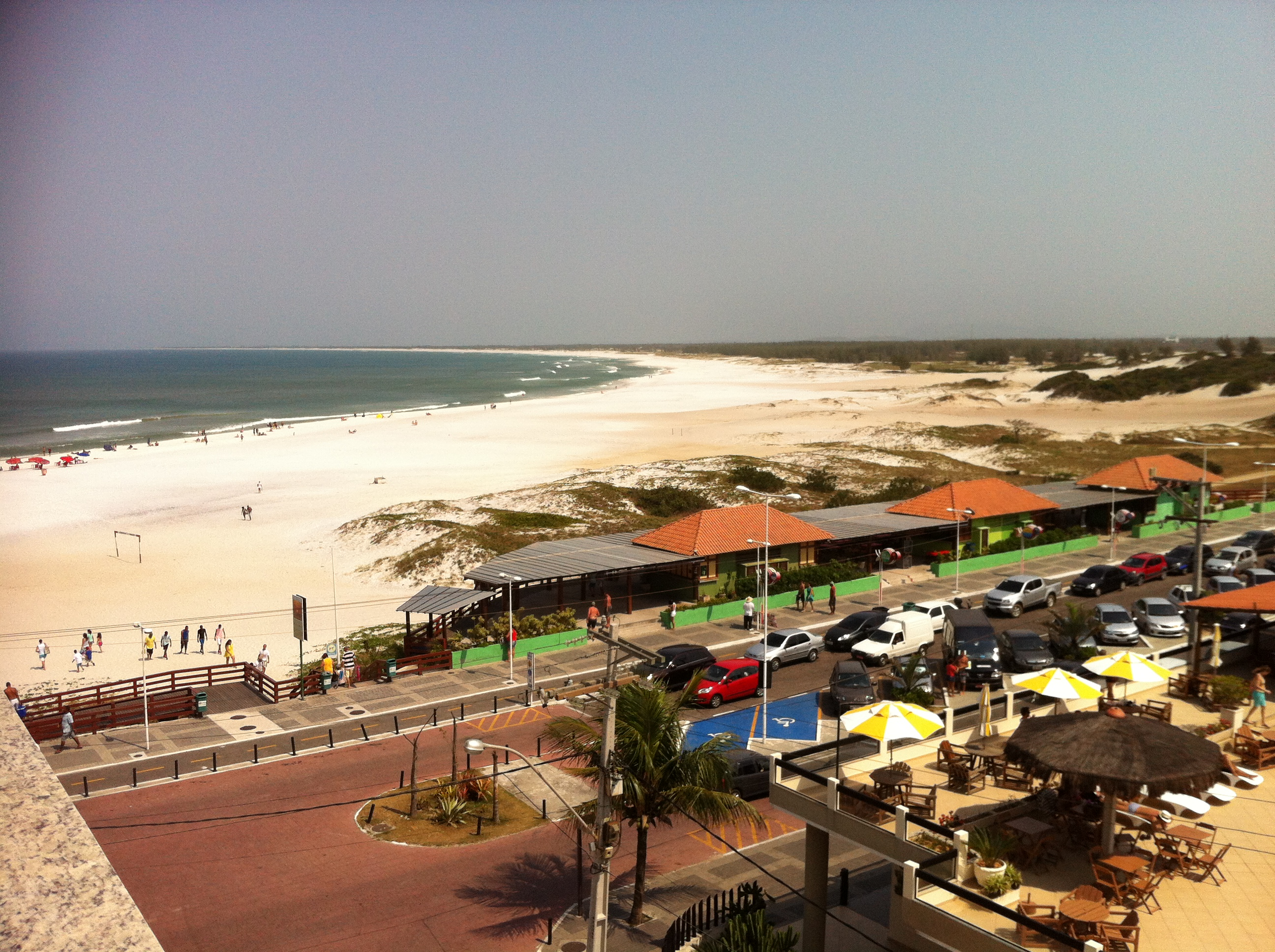
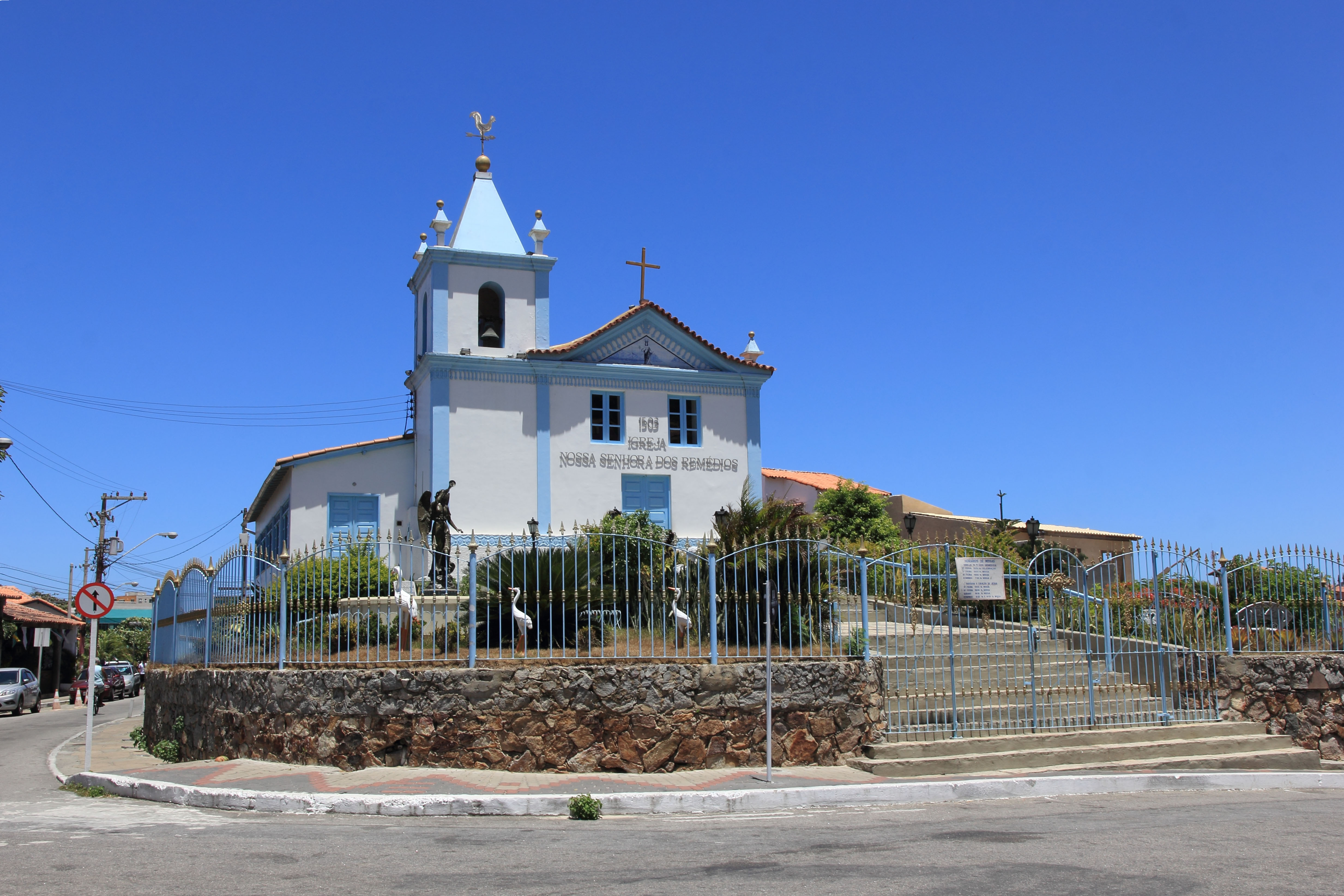
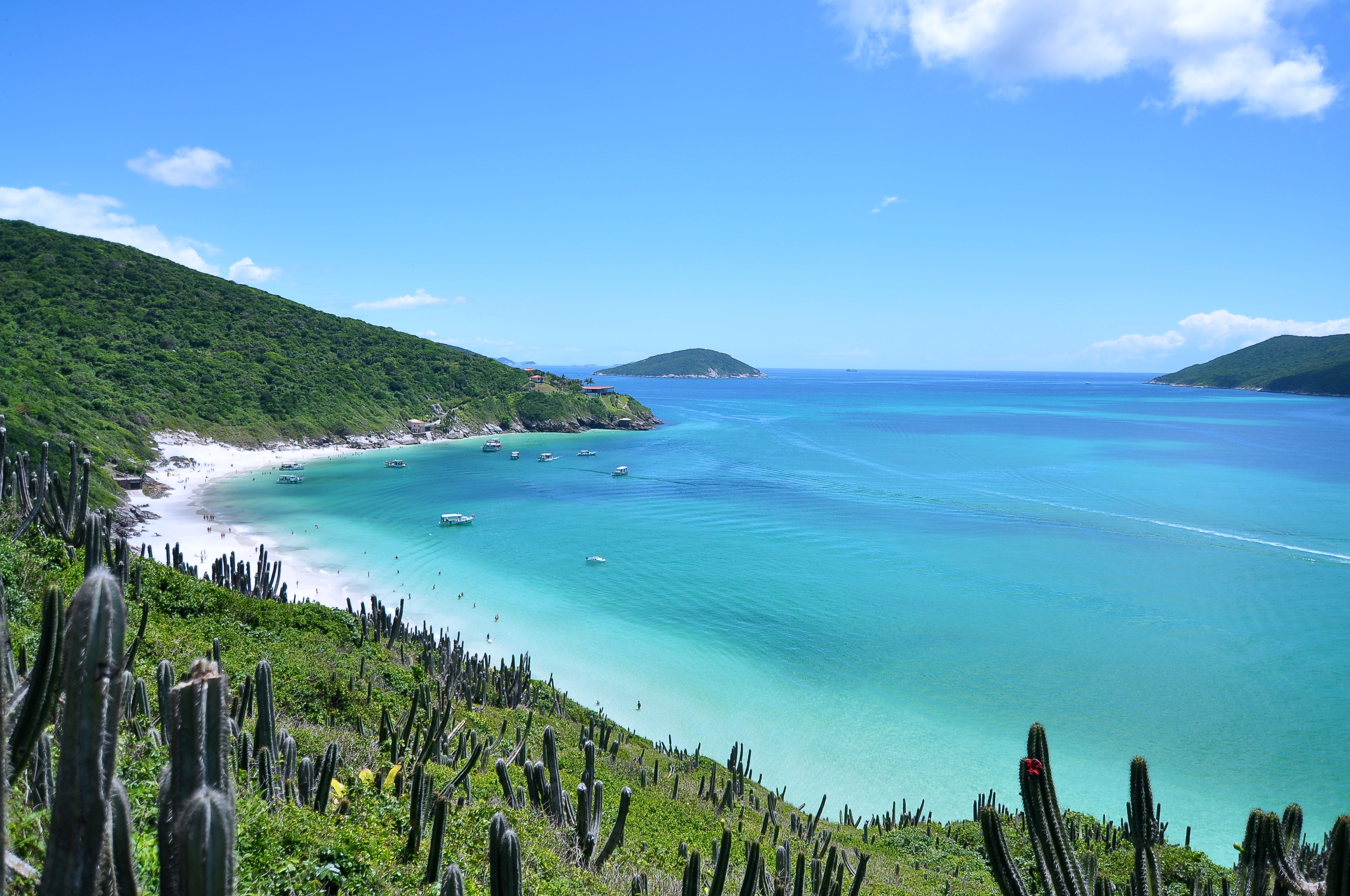
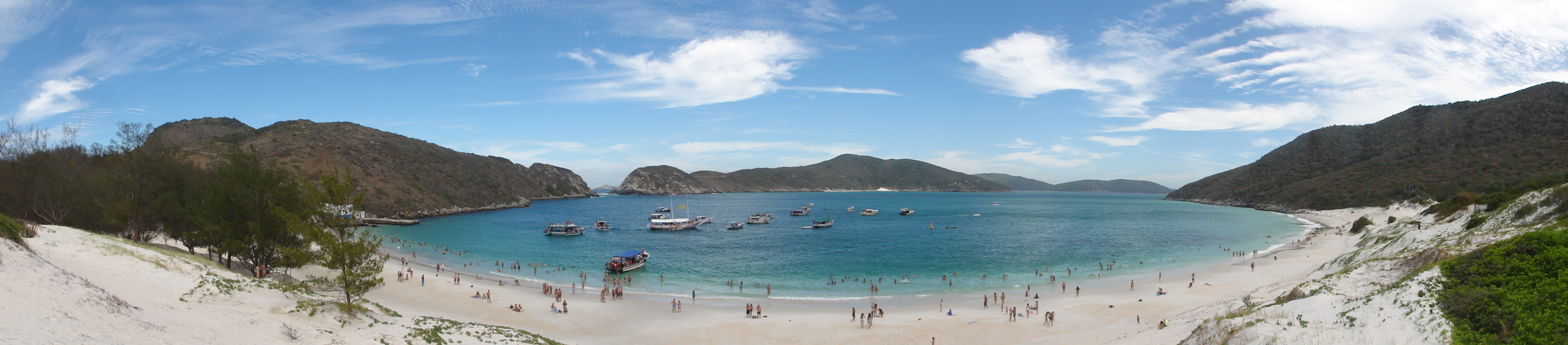

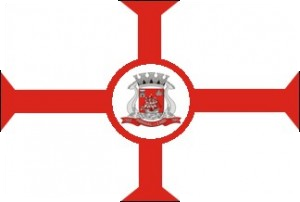
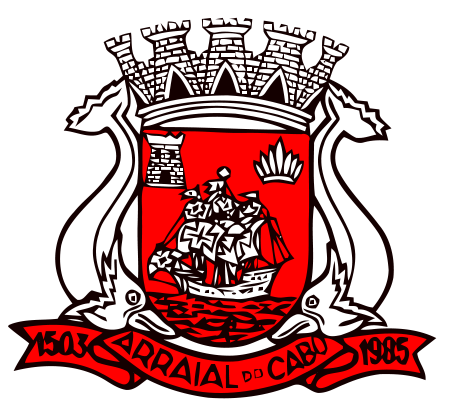
- Flag Coat of arms

- Location in Rio de Janeiro
- Coordinates: 22°57′57″S 42°01′40″W
- Country: Brazil
- Region: Southeast
- State: Rio de Janeiro

Government
  - Mayor: Marcelo Magno (Solidarity)

Area
  - Total: 152.305 km^{2} (58.805 sq mi)
- Elevation: 8 m (26 ft)

Population (2020)
  - Total: 30,593
  - Density: 200.87/km^{2} (520.24/sq mi)
- Time zone: UTC-3 (UTC-3)
- HDI (2010): 0.733 – high
- Website: arraialdocabo.rj.gov.br

Arraial do Cabo (Portuguese pronunciation: [ɐʁɐjˈaw du ˈkabu]) is a municipality located in the Brazilian state of Rio de Janeiro. Its population was 30,593 as of 2020 census and its total area is 160 square kilometres (62 sq mi).

It was founded in 1503 by Amerigo Vespucci the Italian navigator and explorer. In 1960 a documentary film was made directed by Mário Carneiro and Paulo Cesar Saraceni about the local fishing industry.

Its geography made Arraial do Cabo an important and dangerous point in the age of sail. From the arrival of the Portuguese Navy in 1503 through the nineteenth century, many shipwrecks occurred. Due to this fact (and other biological factors) Arraial do Cabo is well known as the "Dive Capital".

The municipality operates the Ilha do Cabo Frio Biological Reserve, a fully protected conservation unit on an Atlantic island in the south east of the municipality. It contains the 56,769 hectares (140,280 acres) Arraial do Cabo Marine Extractive Reserve, created in 1997.

== Climate ==
Climate data for Arraial do Cabo, Rio de Janeiro, Brazil
Month	Jan	Feb	Mar	Apr	May	Jun	Jul	Aug	Sep	Oct	Nov	Dec	Year
Mean daily maximum °C (°F)	28.5 (83.3)	28.6 (83.5)	27.9 (82.2)	26.5 (79.7)	25.2 (77.4)	24.4 (75.9)	23.7 (74.7)	23.9 (75.0)	24.3 (75.7)	25.3 (77.5)	26.4 (79.5)	26.9 (80.4)	26.0 (78.7)
Daily mean °C (°F)	25.1 (77.2)	25.4 (77.7)	25.1 (77.2)	23.7 (74.7)	22.4 (72.3)	21.2 (70.2)	20.6 (69.1)	20.8 (69.4)	21.2 (70.2)	22.1 (71.8)	23.0 (73.4)	24.1 (75.4)	22.9 (73.2)
Mean daily minimum °C (°F)	21.7 (71.1)	22.2 (72.0)	22.4 (72.3)	21.0 (69.8)	19.6 (67.3)	18.1 (64.6)	17.6 (63.7)	17.7 (63.9)	18.1 (64.6)	18.9 (66.0)	19.6 (67.3)	21.4 (70.5)	19.9 (67.8)
Average precipitation mm (inches)	82 (3.2)	58 (2.3)	67 (2.6)	85 (3.3)	71 (2.8)	44 (1.7)	43 (1.7)	37 (1.5)	58 (2.3)	77 (3.0)	88 (3.5)	105 (4.1)	815 (32)
Source: climate-data.org

== Tourism ==
Tourism in Arraial do Cabo is largely associated with its beaches and marine environment. Frequently visited sites include Praia do Forno, which can be reached by trail or boat, Praia do Farol, Prainhas do Pontal do Atalaia and Praia Grande. The municipality is also known for recreational diving, with approximately 30 dive sites, including areas around Ilha dos Porcos, Ilha do Farol and Cardeiro. The management plan for the Arraial do Cabo Marine Extractive Reserve identifies boat excursions, recreational diving, snorkeling, surfing, kayaking and ecotourism among the tourism activities practiced in the region.

== Notable people ==
- Alexandre Pantoja, Brazilian mixed martial artist and the current UFC Flyweight Champion (Ultimate Fighting Championship).
- Flávia Alessandra, Brazilian actress
- Henrique da Silva, Brazilian former footballer (Defender)
