= São José do Norte =

Municipality of Rio Grande do Sul, Brazil

São José do Note
- Municipality
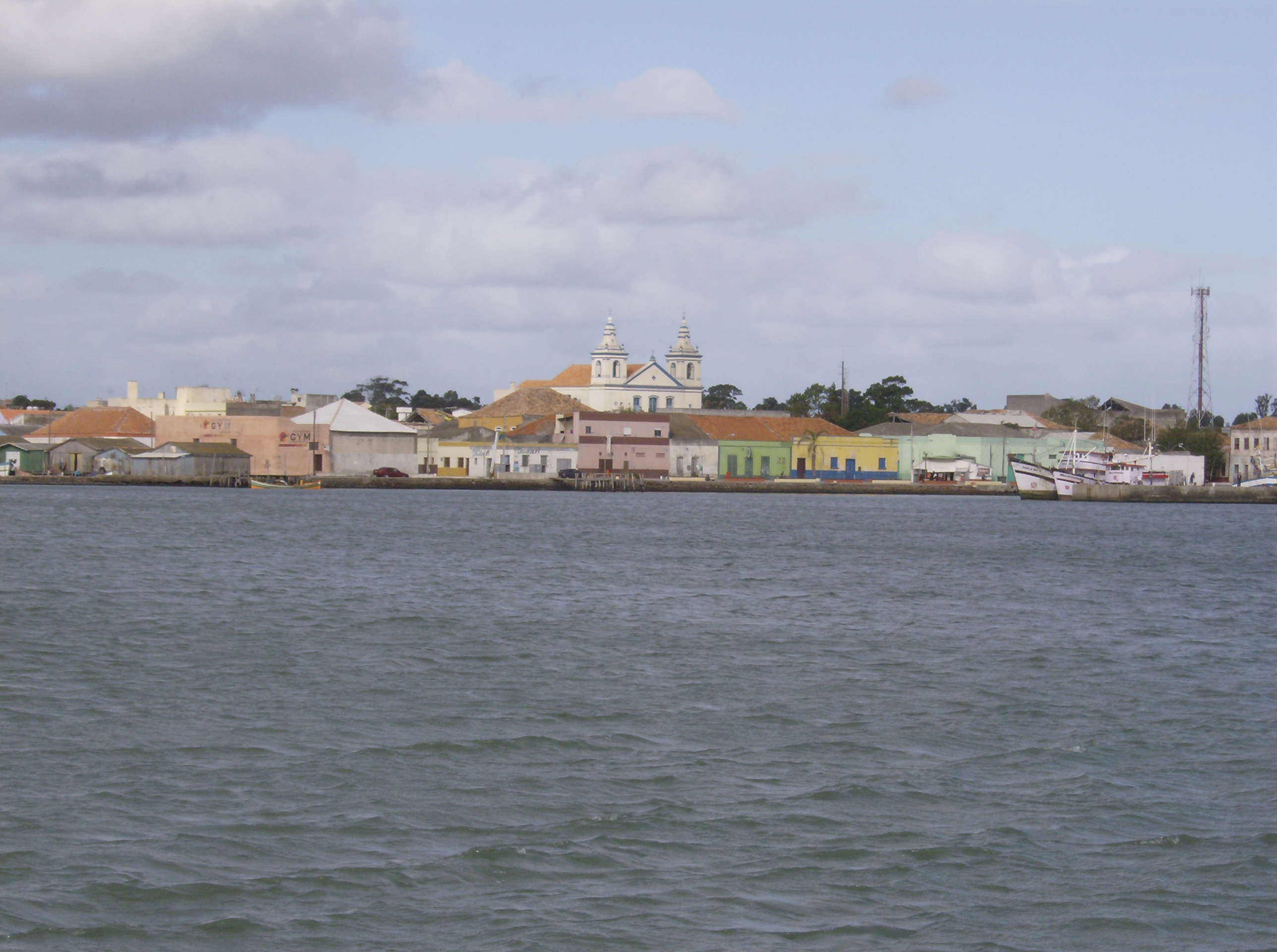
- Part of the town viewed from Lagoa dos Patos

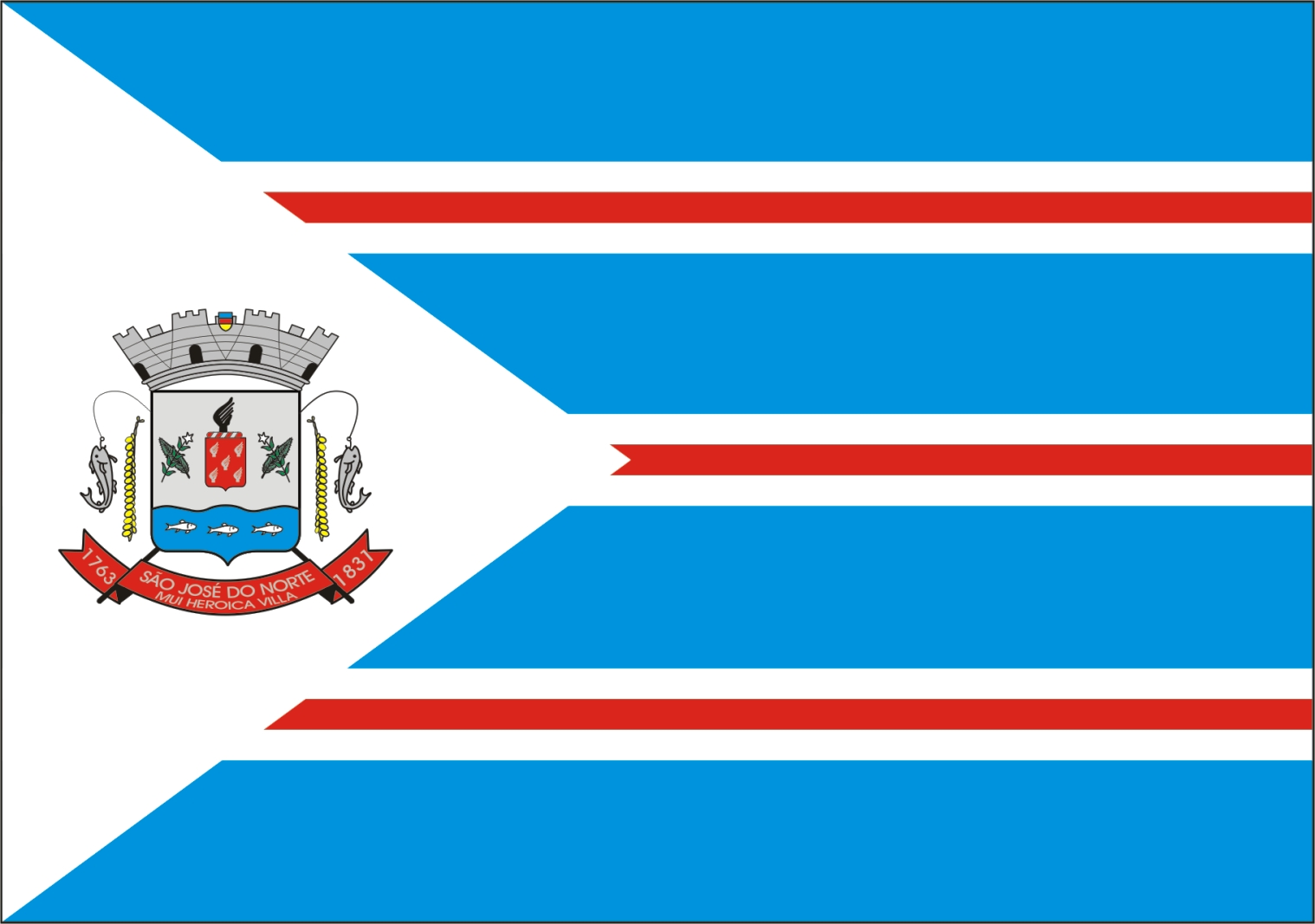
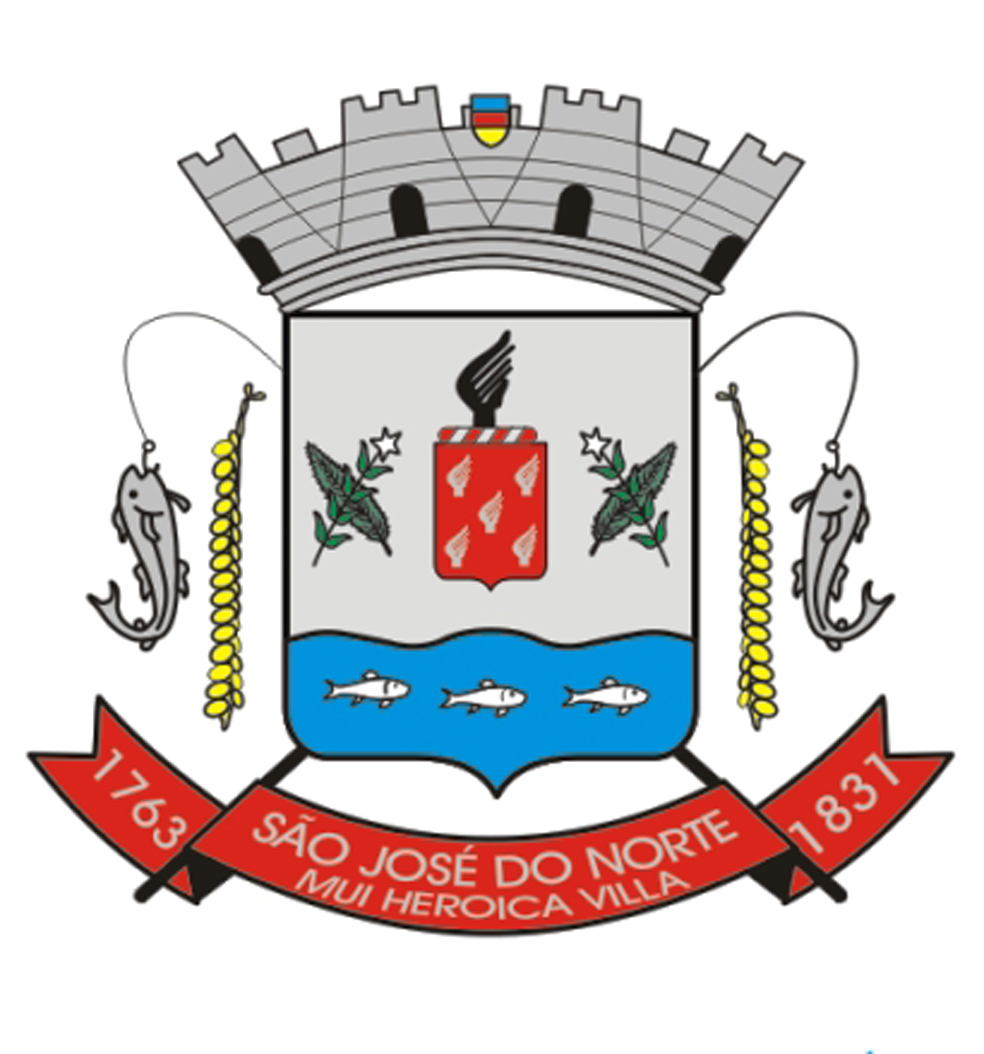
- Flag Coat of arms

- Location within Rio Grande do Sul

- Location in Brazil
- Coordinates: 32°00′54″S 52°02′31″W
- Country: Brazil
- State: Rio Grande do Sul

Government
  - Mayor: Fabiany Zogbi Roig (PSL)

Population (2020)
  - Total: 27,721
- Time zone: UTC−3 (BRT)

São José do Norte is a municipality in the state of Rio Grande do Sul, Brazil. As of 2020, the estimated population was 27,721.

== Tourist attractions ==
1. Igreja Matriz de Sao Jose do Norte (a church)
2. Molhes da Barra
3. Solar Dos Imperadores (a historical site)
4. Farol Da Barra (lighthouse)
5. Sobrado Gibbon (historical site)
6. Mar Grosso Beach
7. Praia do Mar Grosso (beach)

== See also ==
- List of municipalities in Rio Grande do Sul
- Battle of São José do Norte
