= Ilha do Cabo Frio Biological Reserve =

Biological reserve in the state of Rio de Janeiro, Brazil

Ilha do cabo Frio Biological Reserve
- Reserva Biológica da Ilha do Cabo Frio
- IUCN category Ia (strict nature reserve)
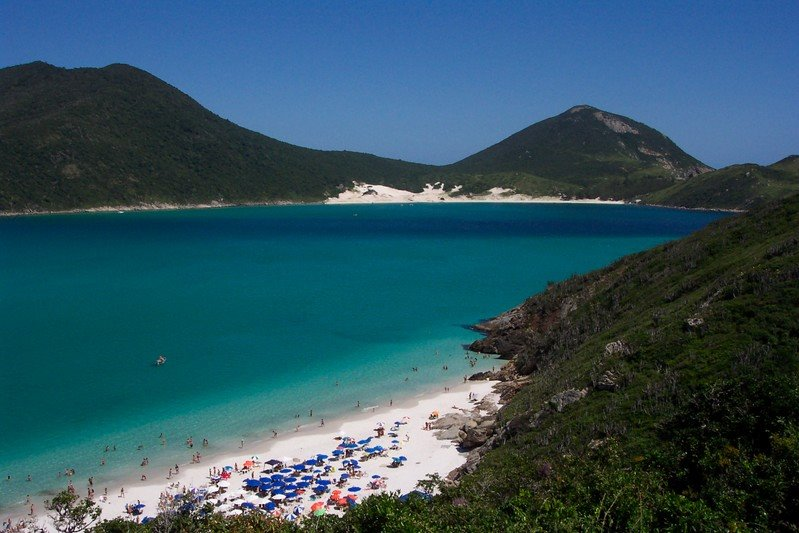
- The island and beach (background) from above Pontal do Atalaia beach (foreground) on the mainland

- Location within Brazil
- Nearest city: Arraial do Cabo, Rio de Janeiro
- Coordinates: 22.995°S 41.989°W
- Area: 700 hectares (1,700 acres)
- Designation: Biological reserve
- Created: 1990
- Administrator: Municipality

Ilha do cabo Frio Biological Reserve (Portuguese: Reserva Biológica da Ilha do Cabo Frio) is a municipal biological reserve in the state of Rio de Janeiro, Brazil. It covers an Atlantic island with a unique micro-climate.

== Location ==
The reserve is located on an Atlantic island in the south east of the municipality of Arraial do Cabo, Rio de Janeiro. The upwelling of cold waters of the Malvinas Current near the island creates a seasonal semi-arid micro-climate and provides the conditions for dunes, hyper-saline lagoons and several endemic and unique communities of vegetation. It has been called the "Plant Diversity Center of Cabo Frio" and recognized by the World Wildlife Fund and International Union for Conservation of Nature. The island, also called the Ilha do Farol (Lighthouse Island), is accessible via boat by visitors to the beach of fine, white sand and the old lighthouse ruins.

== Conservation ==
The reserve was created by the Lei Orgânica Municipal - 1990; Artigo 184 and is administered by the municipality. The objective of the reserve is to provide full conservation of biota and other natural attributes without direct human interference, and there are restrictions to visits by the public and visits for the purpose of scientific research. A permit must be obtained before visiting the island, and duration of stay is limited. It is recognised by UNESCO as part of the Atlantic Forest Biosphere Reserve.

== Sources ==
- Mansur, Kátia Leite (2010), "Territorial planning and geoconservation: analysis of legal provisions in Brazil and a case study in Rio de Janeiro State", Geociênc. (in Portuguese), 29 (2), São Paulo, ISSN 0101-9082
- Meio Biótico (PDF) (in Portuguese), Petrobras, archived from the original (PDF) on May 12, 2016
- Unidades de Conservação da Região dos Lagos (PDF) (in Portuguese), Petrobras, archived from the original (PDF) on May 9, 2016
- Planedia Team (9 July 2014), Arraial do Cabo: Made in Heaven, archived from the original on 2016-05-12
