= Barbier, Benard, et Turenne =

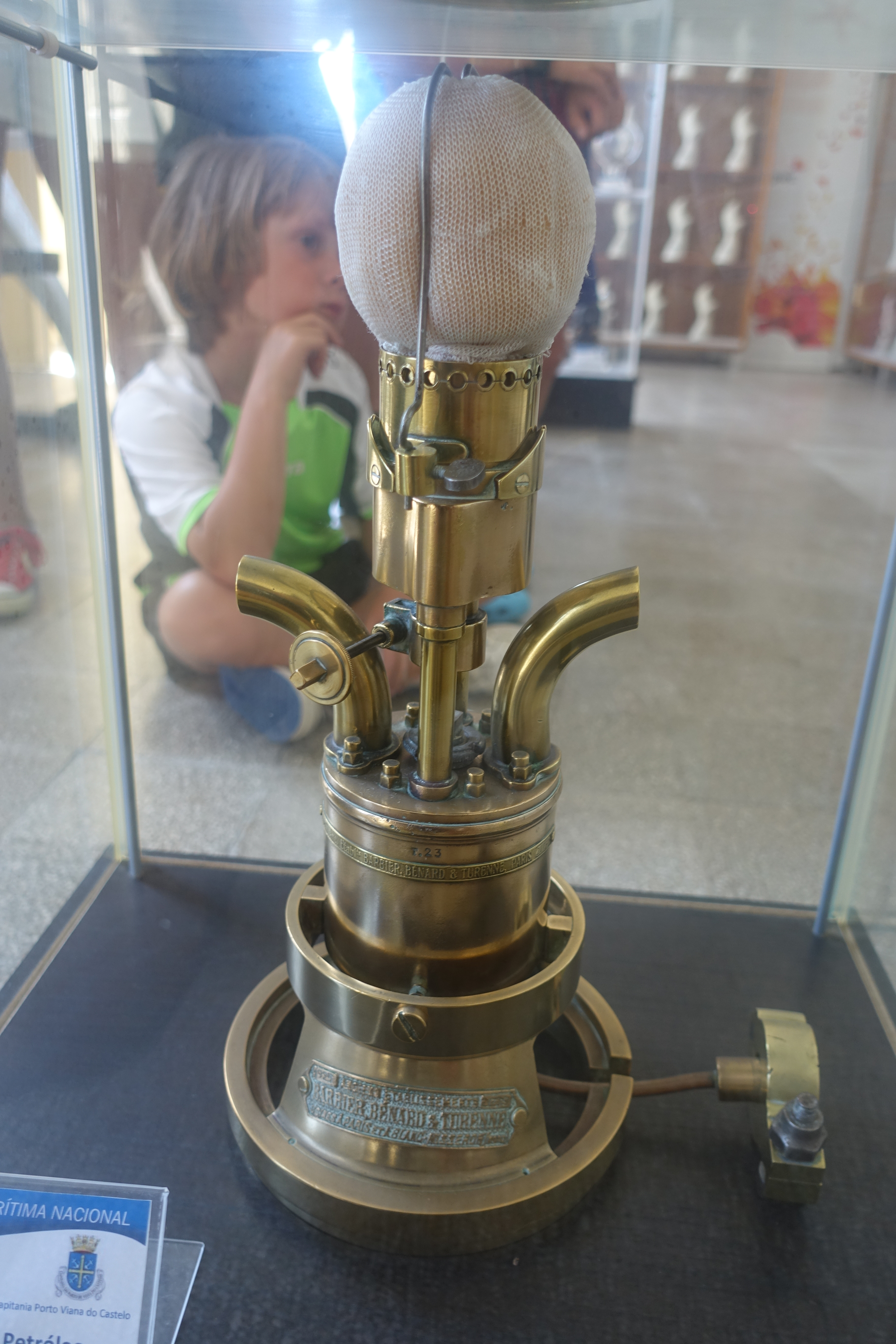
yhumb

Barbier, Benard, et Turenne (BBT) was a French company founded in 1862, specializing in the manufacture of spotlights, Fresnel lenses for lighthouses, and lighting systems. It was the world's leading producer of lighthouse beacons from the end of the 19th century onwards. It dissolved in 1982.

== History ==
The company was founded in 1862 by Frederic Barbier and Stanislas Fenestre as Barbier and Fenestre. It was renamed Barbier et Cie in 1887 and Barbier and Bénard in 1889. It became Barbier, Benard, et Turenne early in the 20th century, and became a public limited company in 1919.

== Production ==
=== Lighthouses ===
Barbier, Benard, et Turenne began with a specialty in the production of equipment for lighthouse beacons, such as Fresnel lenses. It later expanded into production of beacons themselves, as well as rotation mechanisms. Eventually, the company manufactured buoys, metal towers, and fog sirens.

BBT was soon able to build complete lighthouses, and became world renowned for it. It was the world leader in the construction of lighthouses in the late 19th century.

BBT used its expertise in optics, lighting, and construction to expand into other businesses, including stadium and airport floodlights and streetlamps. It also license-produced microscopes.

== Locations ==
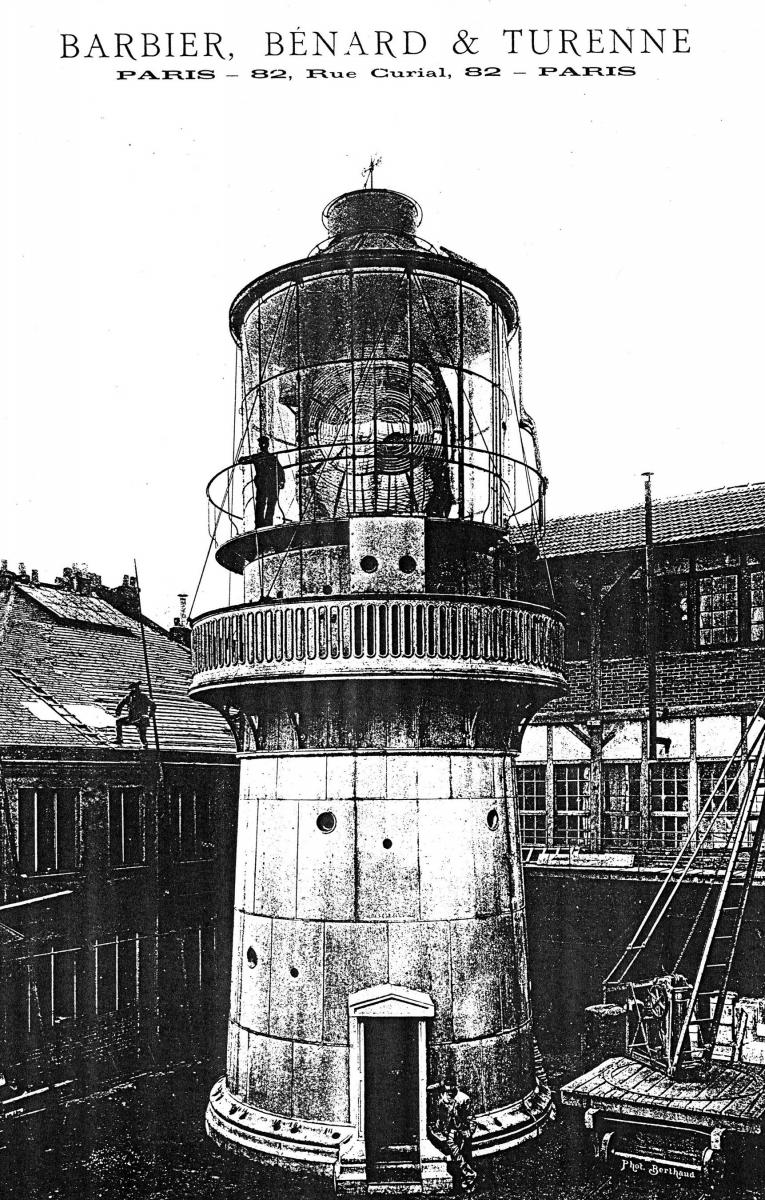
The cast-iron tower and Hyperradiant optic for the Beiyushan Lighthouse, in the construction yard of BBT at Rue Curial, Paris,

BBT's factories were located mainly near the Ourcq Canal in Paris. Its headquarters was also in Paris. It had facilities in Nazelles (Indre-et-Loire) and White Misseron (Nord). BBT had specialist plants for the production of gas for streetlamps, at Sfax and Marseille.

== Dissolution ==
From the 1960s onwards, the industry sectors BBT had invested in began to decline in France. The company was eventually dissolved in 1982.
