= Coastline of Brazil =

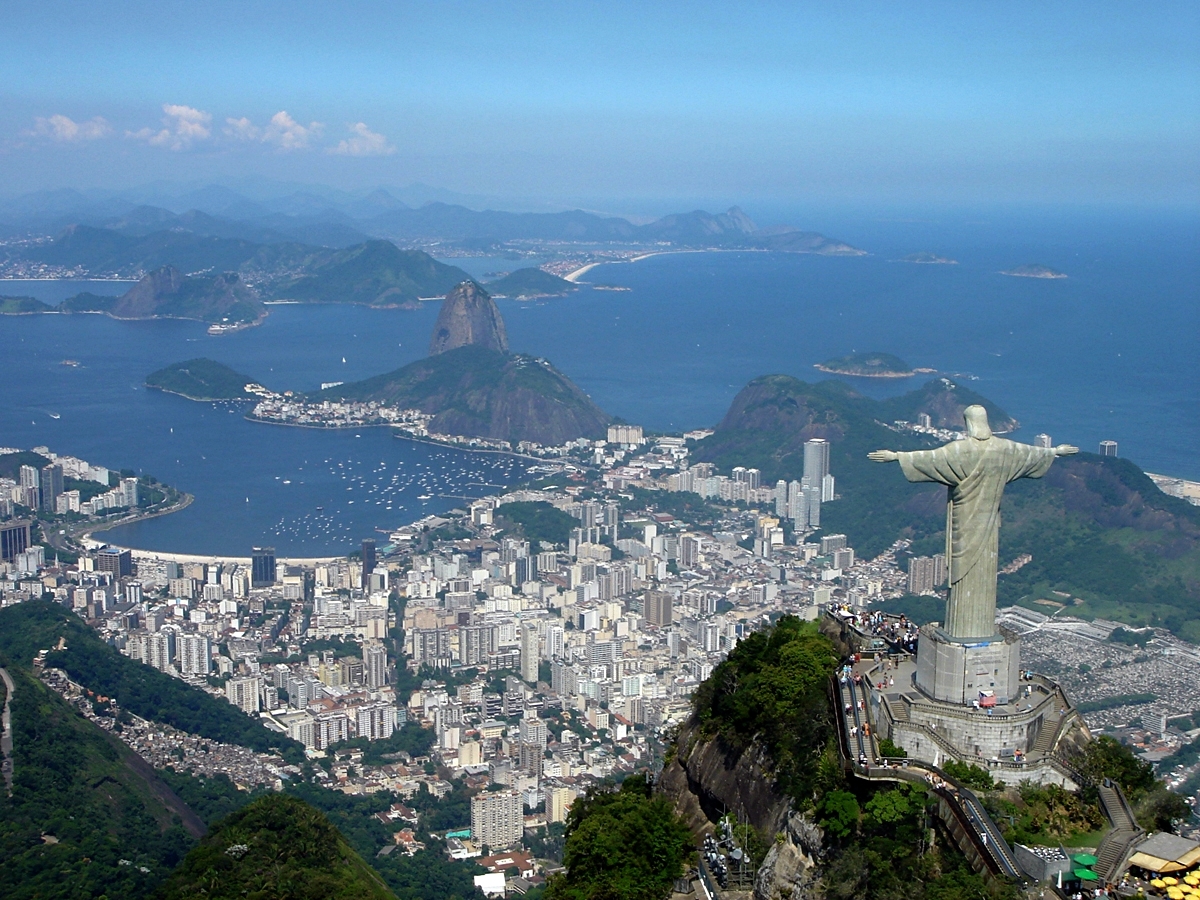
Rio de Janeiro is the largest coastal city in Brazil.

The coastline of Brazil measures 7,491 km, (Note: The length of any coastline may vary drastically depending on the method of measurement, see coastline paradox) making it the 16th longest national coastline in the world. The coastline touches exclusively the Atlantic Ocean. Brazil's coastline has many geographical features such as islands, reefs, bays, and its 2,095 beaches.

9 of Brazil's 26 states are landlocked, including the Federal District. The capitals of the 17 coastal states are close to the ocean, with the exceptions of Curitiba in Paraná, Porto Alegre in Rio Grande do Sul, Teresina in Piauí, Belém in Pará, and Macapá in Amapá.

== From South to North ==
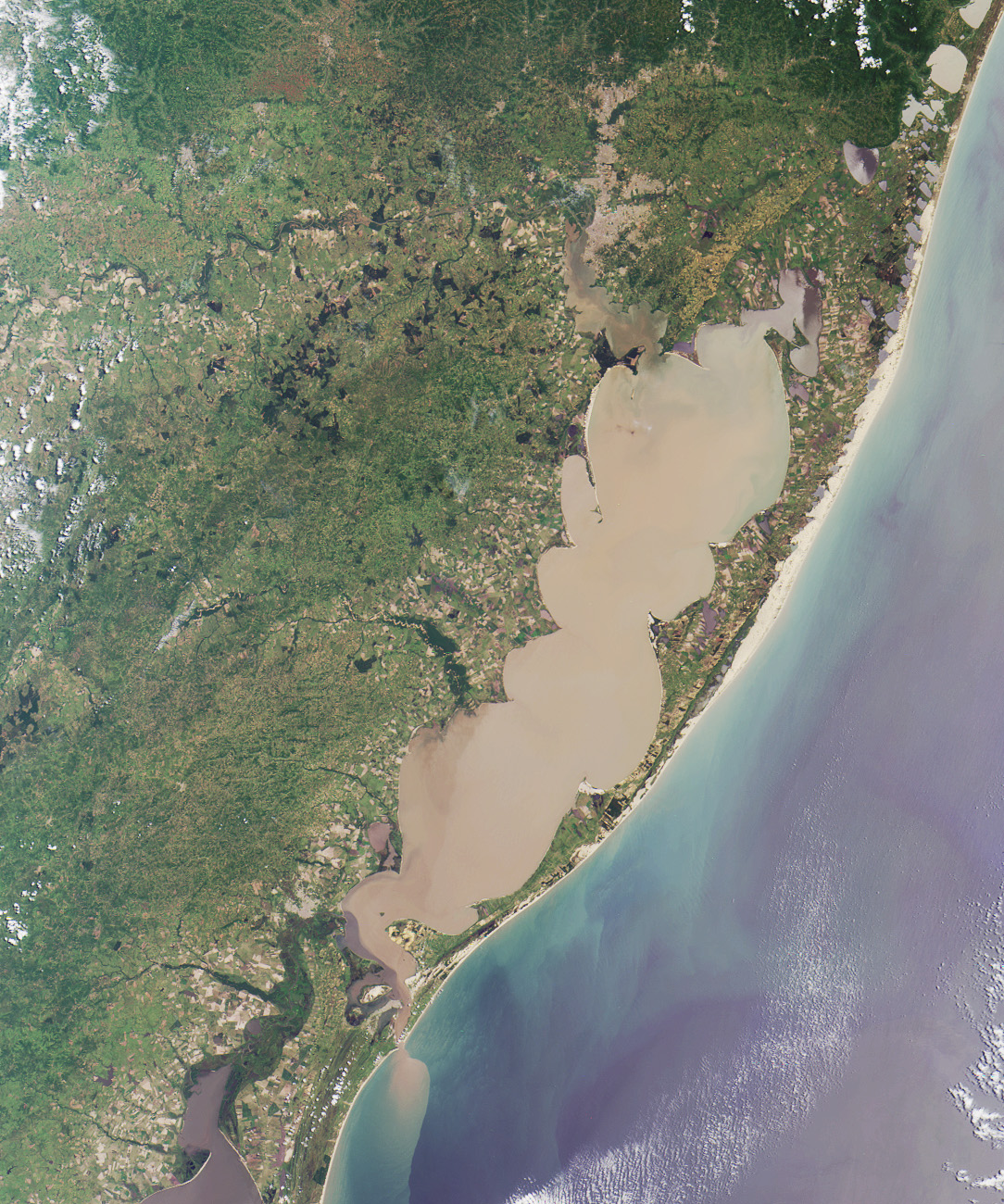
Satellite view of Lagoa dos Patos, in Rio Grande do Sul, with the Atlantic Ocean to the east.

Despite the popularity of the expression "from Oiapoque to Chuí", which refers to the country's southernmost and northernmost points, Brazil's true northernmost and southernmost points are located at Monte Caburaí in Roraima and in Santa Vitória do Palmar, respectively.

The southernmost point of Brazil is located near the Brazil-Uruguay border, within the municipality of Santa Vitória do Palmar. A few kilometers to the north lies the Praia do Cassino, which is 212 to 254 km long. Variation among sources in measurements of the beach's length has raised debate regarding whether the Praia do Cassino is the longest beach in the world, but it is indisputably the longest in Brazil. The only island on Rio Grande do Sul's coastline is the small, rocky Ilha dos Lobos in Torres.

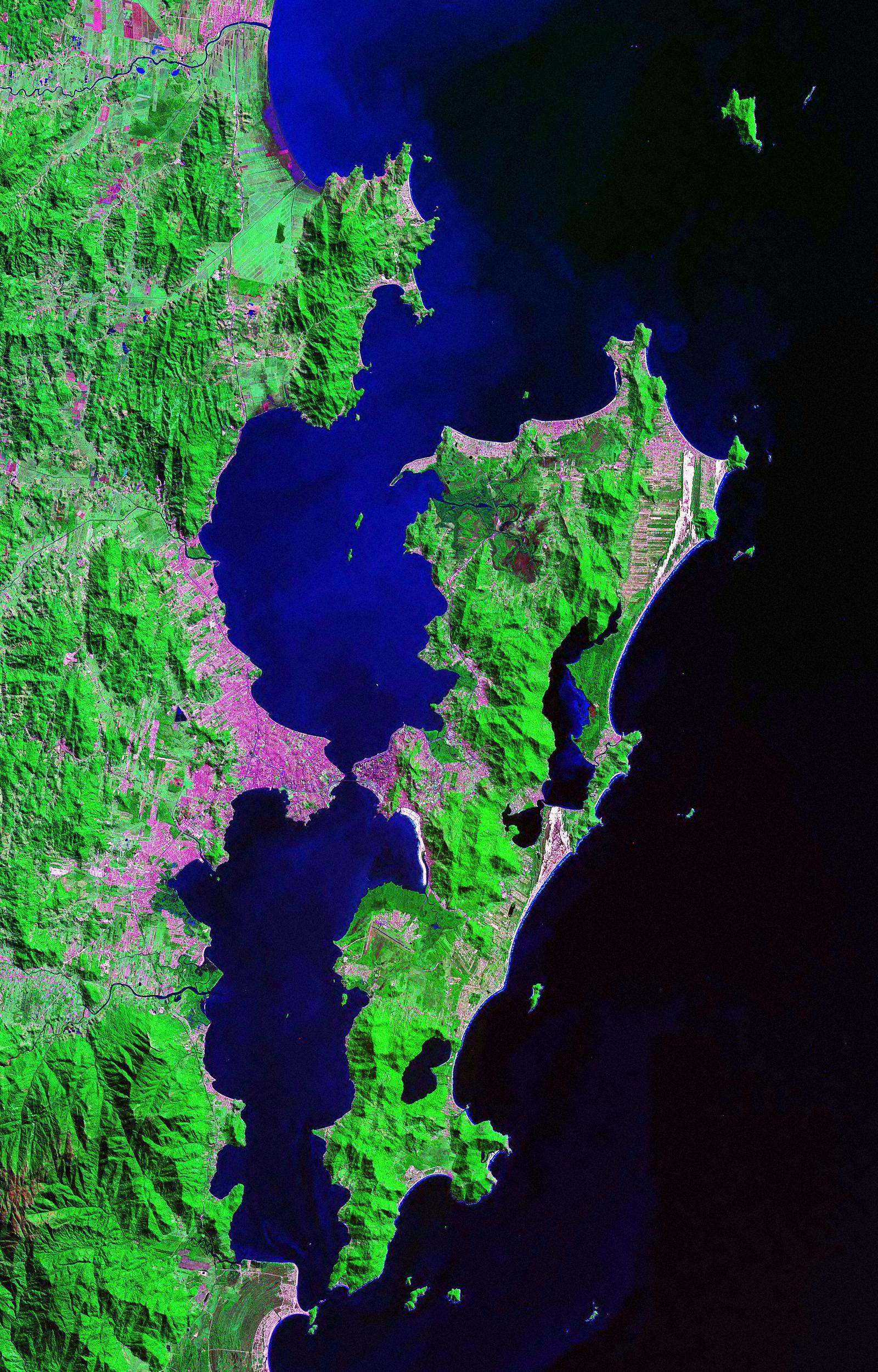
Satellite view of Ilha de Santa Catarina, one of the largest sea islands of Brazil.

The state of Santa Catarina's capital is Florianópolis, located on Santa Catarina Island. The island, which spans an area of 424.4 km^{2}, is one of the largest in Brazil. The Serra do Mar mountain range starts in Santa Catarina, and follows the coastline north, ending in Espírito Santo.

Paraná's coastline is small compared to other states, but it is very diverse geographically, containing a considerable number of islands and bays.

São Paulo, contains famous coastal cities such as Guarujá, São Sebastião and Ilhabela. The northern portions of the coastlines of São Paulo and Rio de Janeiro are the only southern-facing stretches of Brazil's coast, not including small islands and bays.

The state of Rio de Janeiro is known for its capital's beaches such as Ipanema and Copacabana. The state also contains the Campos Basin, the largest petroleum-rich area in Brazil. Covering an area of 100,000 km^{2} and extending to Espírito Santo, the basin produces 1.49 million barrels of oil every day. 1,200 km east of Vitória, in Espírito Santo, lie the islands of Trindade and Martim Vaz.

Bahia has the longest coastline of the Brazilian states, and also the greatest number of coastal municipalities. Porto Seguro is regarded as the first place in which the explorer Pedro Álvares Cabral set foot.

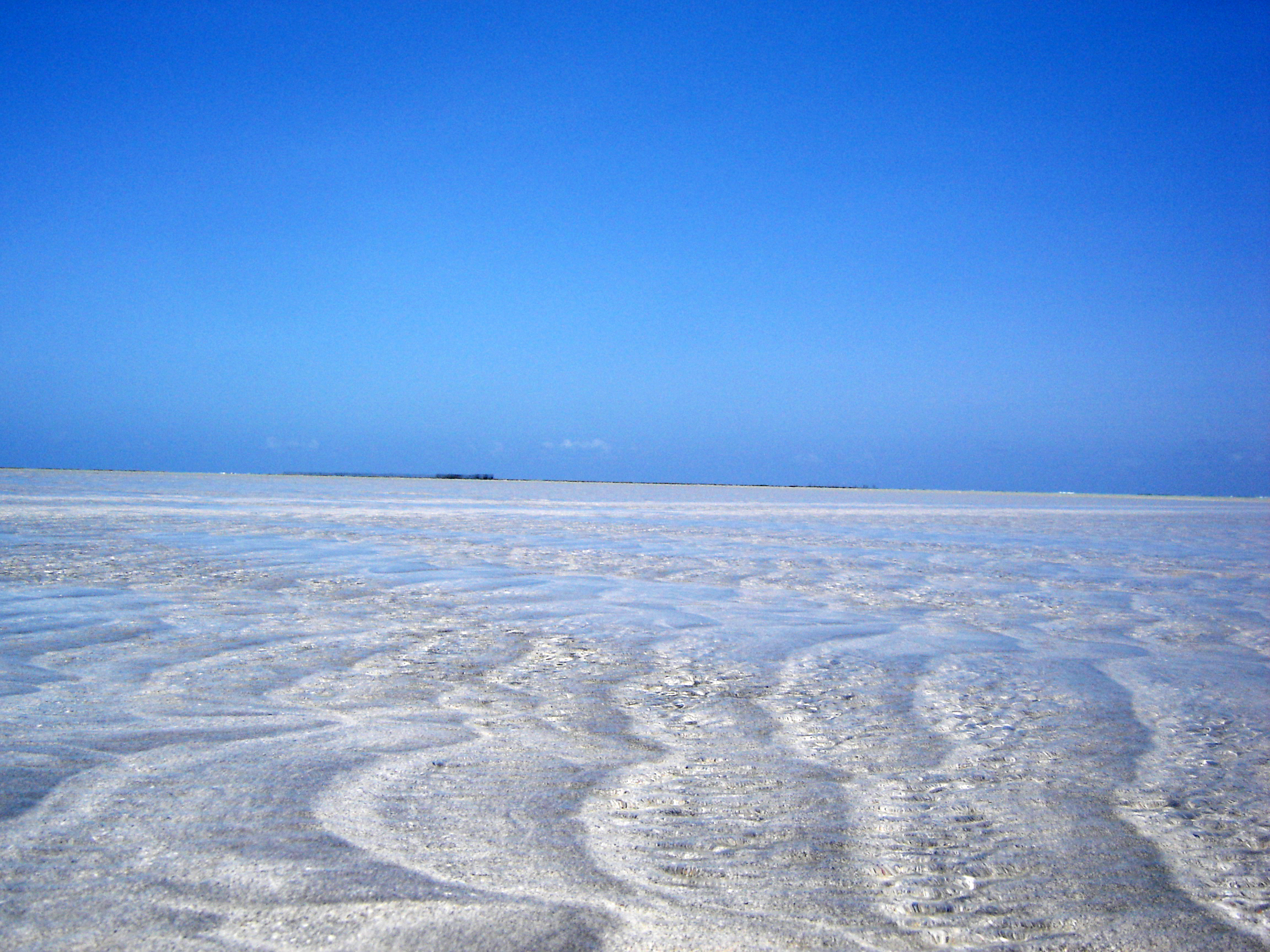
Maragogi, Alagoas.

From Sergipe to Ceará, the landscape changes little, remaining relatively flat. Most of their islands are separated from the continent by narrow channels.

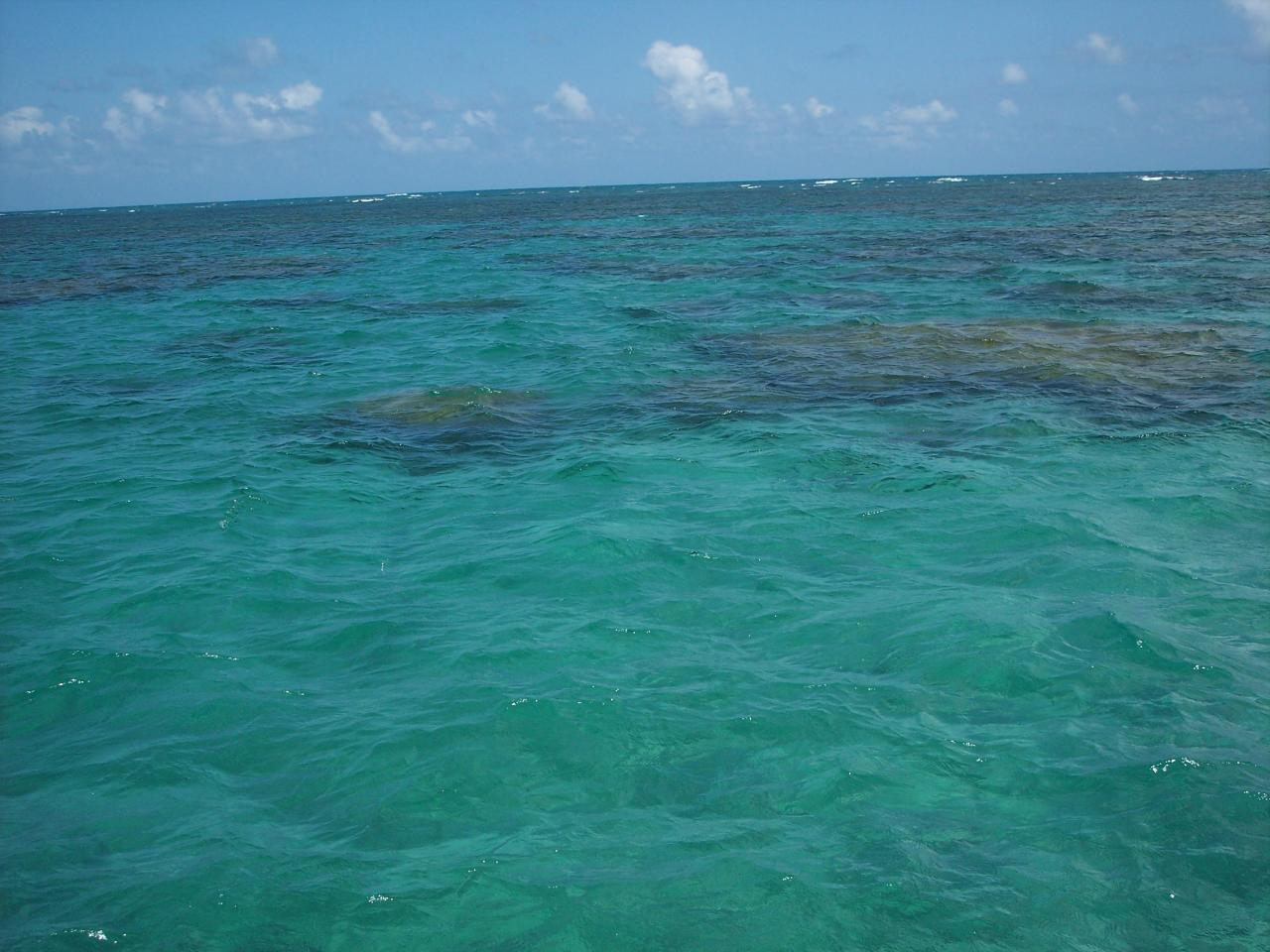
Maracajaú, Natal.

Piauí has a coastline of only some 60 km, the smallest of any Brazilian state. It contains the cities of Cajueiro da Praia, Ilha Grande Luís Correia and Parnaíba.

Maranhão is noted for its unique geographical features such as Lençóis Maranhenses. The area between Maranhão and Pará is dominated by the "Reentrâncias Maranhenses", a landform similar to a fjord but shorter, narrower and lower. There are almost no beaches in this part of the coast.

Half the coastline of Pará is characterized by the Amazon Delta, which flows into the Atlantic around Marajó, the largest fluvial island in the world. The outflow of the Amazon River is so strong that the ocean waters in the north and northeast faces of the island have low salinity.

Amapá's coastline is almost 600 km long, but there are only three beaches: Fazendinha, Boca do Inferno and Goiabal. The coastline of Brazil ends in Cape Orange, in the city of Oiapoque.

== See also ==
- Geography of Brazil
- List of beaches in Brazil
- List of islands of Brazil
