= Delta do Parnaíba Marine Extractive Reserve =

Protected area in Maranhão and Piauí, Brazil

- Reserva Extrativista Marinha do Delta do Parnaíba
- IUCN category VI (protected area with sustainable use of natural resources)
- Location within Brazil
- Nearest city: Araioses, Maranhão
- Coordinates: 2.789514°S 41.928743°W
- Area: 27,022 hectares (66,770 acres)
- Designation: Extractive reserve
- Administrator: Chico Mendes Institute for Biodiversity Conservation

The Delta do Parnaíba Marine Extractive Reserve (Portuguese: Reserva Extrativista Marinha do Delta do Parnaíba) is a coastal marine extractive reserve in the states of Maranhão and Piauí, Brazil.

== Location ==
The Delta do Parnaíba Marine Extractive Reserve is divided between the municipalities of Araioses (99.57%) in Maranhão and Ilha Grande (3.84%) in Piauí. It has an area of 27,022 hectares (66,770 acres). It is contained within the Delta do Parnaíba Environmental Protection Area.

== History ==
The Delta do Parnaíba Marine Extractive Reserve was created by federal decree on 16 November 2000. It is administered by the Chico Mendes Institute for Biodiversity Conservation (ICMBio). It is classed as an IUCN protected area category VI (protected area with sustainable use of natural resources). An extractive reserve is an area used by traditional extractive populations whose livelihood is based on extraction, subsistence agriculture and small-scale animal raising. Its basic objectives are to protect the livelihoods and culture of these people and to ensure sustainable use of natural resources.

On 10 November 2005 the reserve was recognised as supporting 2,000 families, who would qualify for PRONAF support.

== Sources ==
- Resex Delta do Parnaíba (in Portuguese), ICMBio: Chico Mendes Institute for Biodiversity Conservation, archived from the original on 2016-09-28
- RESEX Marinha do Delta do Parnaíba (in Portuguese), ISA: Instituto Socioambiental
- Unidade de Conservação: Reserva Extrativista Marinha do Delta do Parnaíba (in Portuguese), MMA: Ministério do Meio Ambiente
