= TSS Christino Cruz =

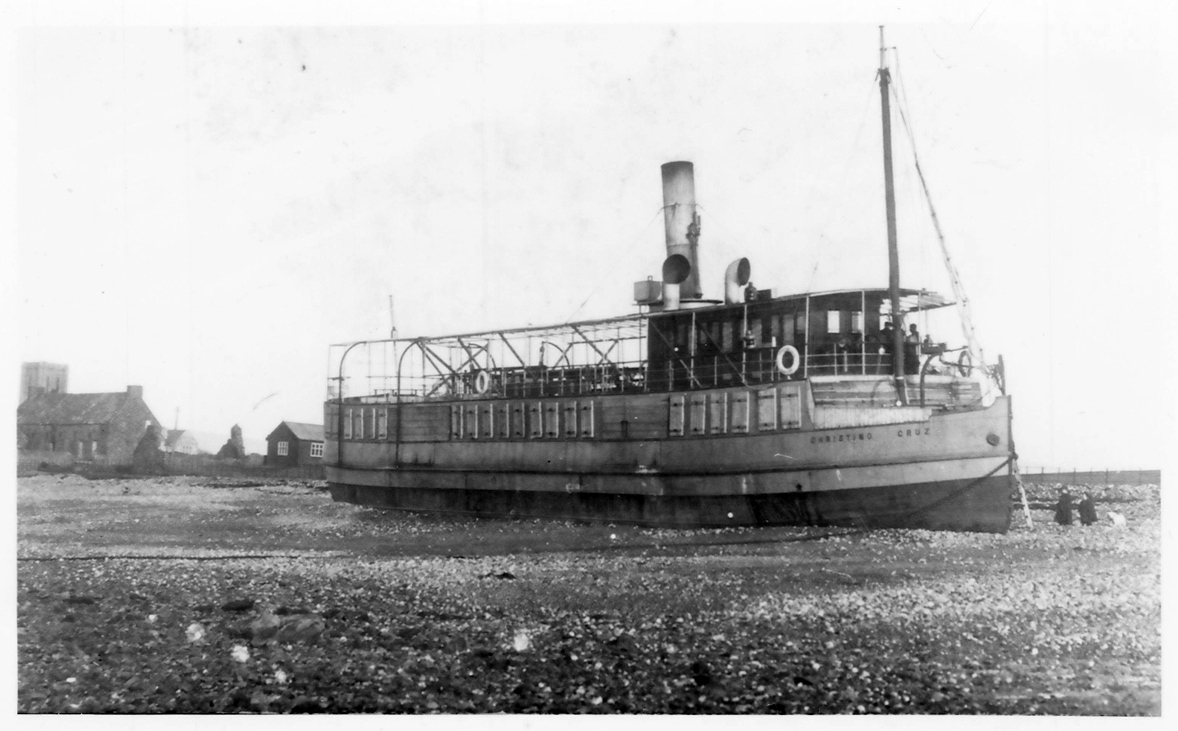

History

Brazil
- Name: Christino Cruz
- Owner: Companhia de Navegação a Vapor do Rio Parnahyba - CNVP (Steam Navigation Company of the Parnahyba River), Teresina, Piauí, Brazil
- Operator: Companhia de Navegação a Vapor do Rio Parnahyba - CNVP
- Builder: Lytham Shipbuilding & Engineering Company, Lytham St Annes, Lancashire
- Cost: £8,400
- Launched: 18 January 1913
- Commissioned: 25 January 1913
- Maiden voyage: 4 February 1913
- Home port: Teresina
- Fate: Out of service (unknown date and reason)

General characteristics
- Tonnage: 178.29 tons
- Length: 35.2 m (115 ft)
- Beam: 7.0 m (23.0 ft)
- Draught: 1.2 m (3.9 ft)
- Decks: 3
- Installed power: 350 horse power
- Propulsion: Twin screw engines of 350 horse power with vertical surface condensing
- Speed: 11 knots
- Boats & landing craft carried: 1 lifeboat measuring 18 feet by 6 feet by 2 1/2 feet, fully equipped, including a compass, and capable of carrying all the crew
- Crew: 12
- Sensors & processing systems: 1 compass, supplied and adjusted by John Bruce & Sons of Liverpool
- Notes: 1 single-ended return tube boiler fired from the foremost end, loaded to 150 lbs. pressure.

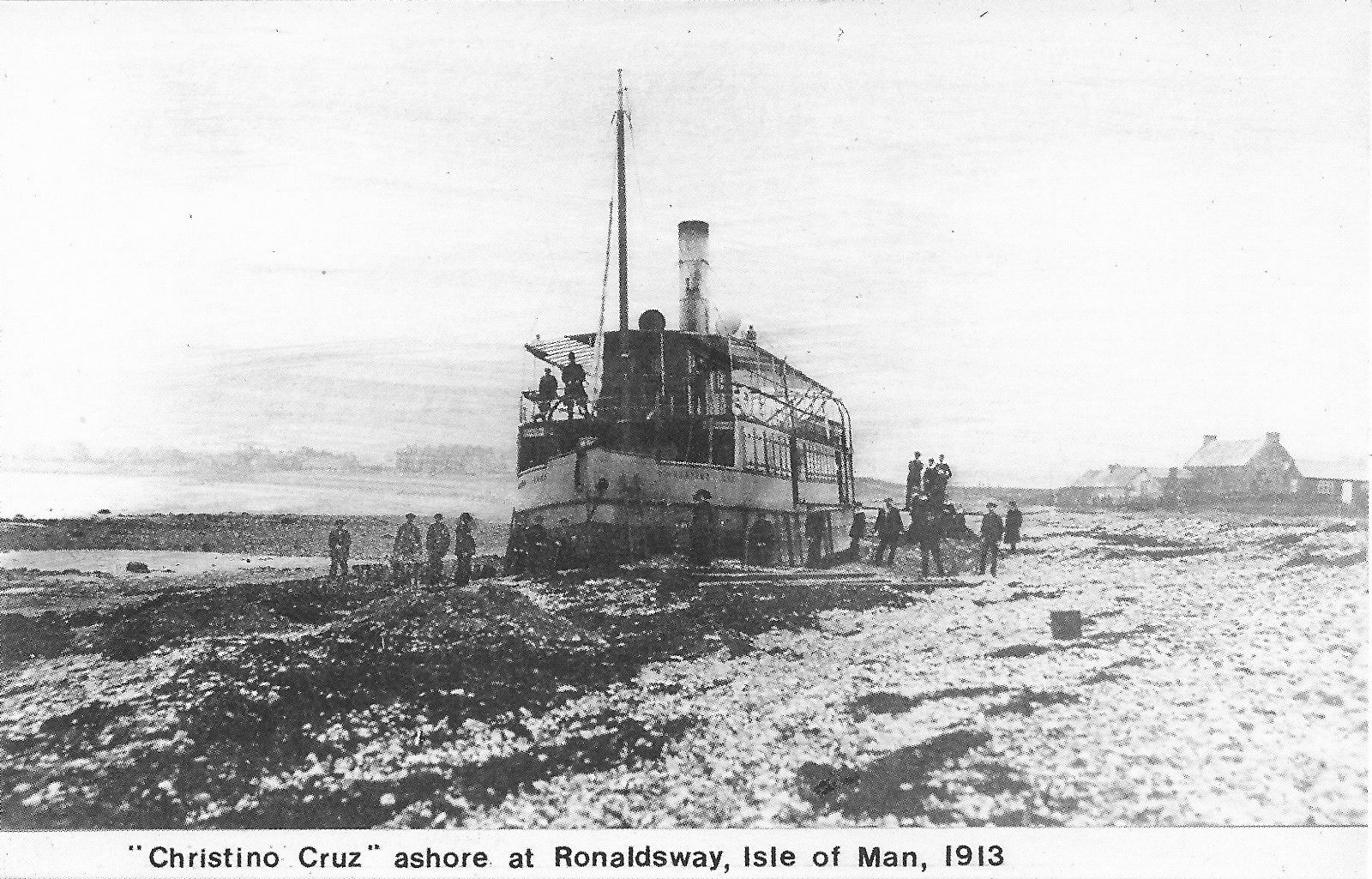
TSS Christino Cruz accidentally ashore at Ronaldsway, near Hango Hill / Derbyhaven, Castletown, Isle of Man, United Kingdom, on February 13, 1913, before its transfer from Preston to Tutóia (on the Parnaíba River delta), Brazil. The 178 ton riverboat finally returned to float on February 21.

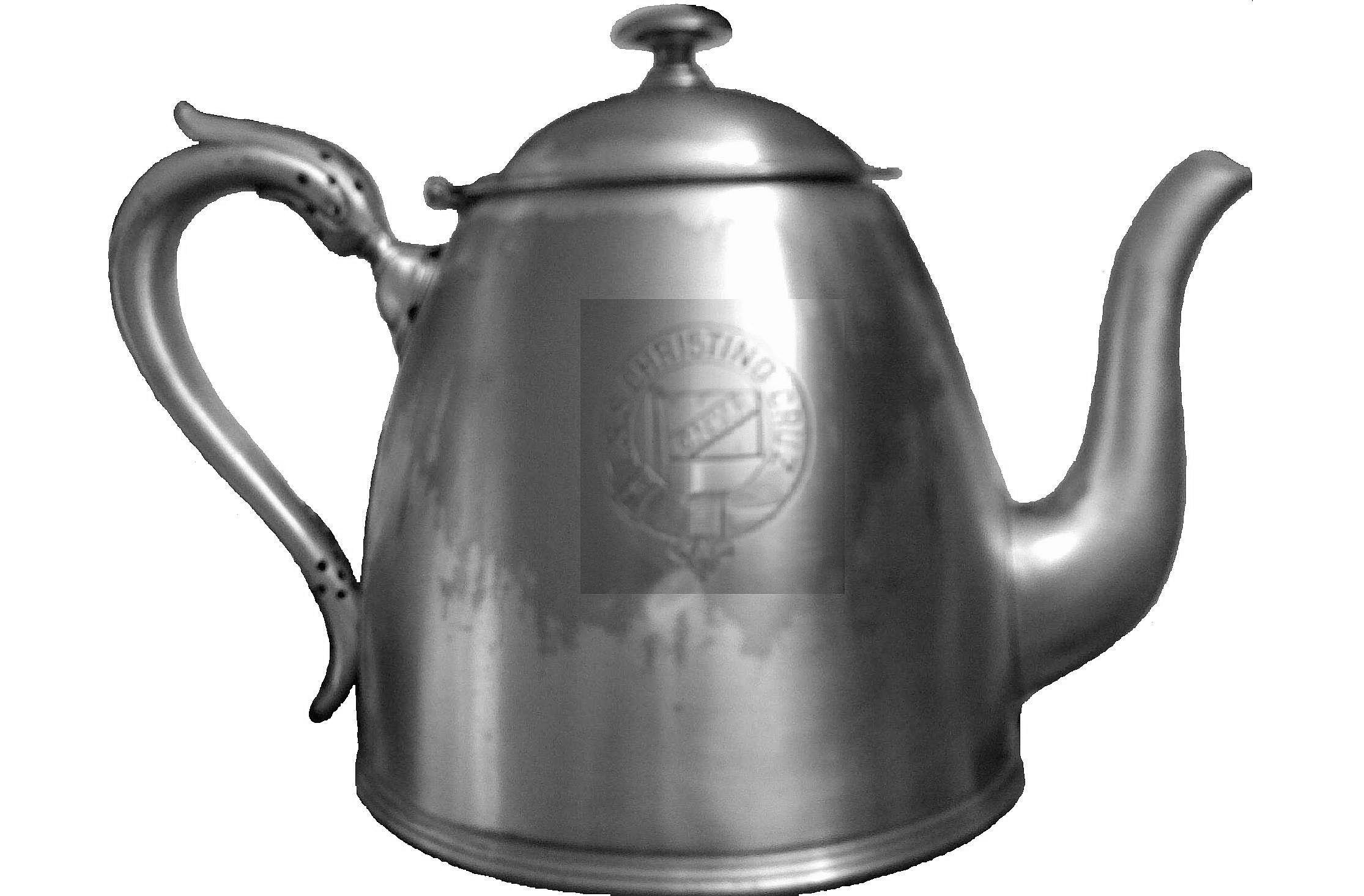
Silver teapot of TSS Christino Cruz shipboard service. José Mentor Guilherme de Mello's family collection.

TSS Christino Cruz was a twin screw tunnel steamship built of steel by the Lytham Shipbuilding and Engineering Co., Ltd. at Lytham, for the Companhia de Navegação a Vapor do Rio Parnahyba - CNVP (Steam Navigation Company of the Parnahyba River), Teresina, Brazil, for whom Messrs. R. Singlehurst & Co., Liverpool, were the agents. She was intended for river service as a commercial passenger-carrying coal-fired steamship and was sailed under the Brazilian flag, having a provincial certificate of Nationality issued by the Brazilian Consul in Liverpool.

The riverboat was described on the builders' certificate as having three decks, and one mast, and was cutter rigged. She was clincher built with an elliptical stern and straight stem. Her length was 115.5 feet, main breadth 23.1 feet, with depth in hold from tonnage deck to ceiling amidships, 4.45 feet. Her gross tonnage was 178.29 tons and net register tonnage 121.24 tons. She had two decks, the main deck was of steel and the promenade deck of teak which did not run the whole length of the vessel. The third deck or sun deck was to be laid on her arrival in Brazil. The space between these decks was boarded up for the voyage. The vessel had vertical surface condensing twin screw engines of 350 estimated horse power, designed to give her a speed of 11 or 11 1/2 knots. She had one single-ended return tube boiler fired from the foremost end, loaded to 150 lbs. pressure. She was fitted with both hand and steam steering gear worked from the fore end of the promenade deck by means of chains and rods to the rudder head which was carried up to that level.

She was incorporated to the fleet of CNVP when the company's managing director and owner was the entrepreneur and exporter José Mentor Guilherme de Mello. The vessel was the first of the fleet (until then) to cross the Atlantic Ocean, sailing from Lytham / Preston (near Liverpool), United Kingdom (where it was manufactured), to Tutóia, on the Parnaíba River delta, Brazil.

Christino Cruz was christened with this name as a tribute to Christino Cruz, agronomist and congressman from the Brazilian state of Maranhão, who was also honorary president of the Sociedade Nacional de Agricultura (Brazilian National Society of Agriculture).

A curious fact happened to the ship on February 6, 1913, early in her first attempt to cross the Atlantic Ocean from Preston bound for Tutóia. According to the detailed "BOT Wreck Report for Christino Cruz, 1913" - No. 7601, of 12 June 1913, produced by the Board of Trade, and records of the Manx National Heritage, the wind and seas were too heavy for the ship and she began to drift backwards. At noon she was sighted off The Stack at Scarlett, which she narrowly missed. And drifting backwards she crossed the Castletown bay. The Castletown lifeboat was launched but by the time she was on the coast just beyond Hango Hill it was too shallow for the lifeboat. The steam boat ran aground and the crew were taken off by the Castletown rocket brigade. Attempts to refloat her were unsuccessful and on 21 February they used greased poles to roll her lower down the beach. She was taken into Castletown harbour for minor repairs before two tugboats took her back to the UK on 22 February. The event proved to be of interest to the people of Castletown and to the lads of the King William's College, near the beach where the ship ran aground, who came to look at her. And they seem to have been in doubt if, after this difficulty, Christino Cruz would have still managed to cross the Atlantic Ocean to its destination in South America under her own steam, as noted in a publication of the Manx National Heritage of August 1999.
