= Mirandinha (footballer, born 1959) =

Brazilian footballer

Personal information
- Full name: Francisco Ernandi Lima da Silva
- Date of birth: 2 July 1959 (age 67)
- Place of birth: Chaval, Ceará, Brazil
- Height: 1.70 m (5 ft 7 in)
- Position: Striker

Senior career*
Years	Team	Apps	(Gls)
1977–1978	Ferroviario		
1978–1979	Ponte Preta		
1979–1980	Palmeiras		
1980–1982	Botafogo		
1983–1984	Náutico		
1985	Portuguesa		
1986–1987	Palmeiras		
1987–1989	Newcastle United	54	(20)
1989–1990	Palmeiras		
1990	Belenenses	3	(2)
1991	Corinthians		
1991	Fortaleza		
1992	Shimizu S-Pulse	0	(0)
1993–1994	Bellmare Hiratsuka	30	(14)
1995	Fortaleza		

International career
1987	Brazil	4	(1)

Managerial career
- 1996: Ferroviario
- 1997: Botafogo-DF
- 1998: Hajer Club
- 1999: Goiânia
- 1999: Rio Negro
- 1999–2000: Al-Raed
- 2000: Nacional de Manaus
- 2001: Rio Negro
- 2002: Flamengo-PI
- 2002: Hajer Club
- 2003: Ríver
- 2004: Kedah FA
- 2005: Cascavel
- 2006: Libermorro
- 2006: Rio Negro
- 2007–2008: Libermorro
- 2008: Fortaleza
- 2009–2010: Hajer Club
- 2010: Parnahyba
- 2010: Ferroviario
- 2012: Maguary
- 2015: Al-Ahly Shendi
- 2016: Itapirense
- 2017–: Genus
- * Club domestic league appearances and goals

Francisco Ernandi Lima da Silva (born 2 July 1959), better known as Mirandinha, is a Brazilian former professional footballer who played as a striker.

== Club career ==
Mirandinha was born in Chaval, Ceará. He had unsuccessful early spells at Ceará and Fortaleza, before finding some success at the 'third club' in Fortaleza city, Ferroviário. He then moved to play for Ponte Preta. As of 1981 he was playing for Botafogo in the Taça de Ouro.

Mirandinha signed for Newcastle United in 1987 for £575,000, becoming the first Brazilian to play in English football. He made his debut in September 1987, in a 1–1 draw away to Norwich City.

He scored his first Football League goals against Manchester United at Old Trafford, just 24 hours after his attacking ability had been described as a 'myth' by George Best. At the end of his first season in English football, he was selected as part of the EFL XI to face Ireland in Dublin. He left Newcastle in 1989, returning to his former club Palmeiras.

In 1991, he moved from Palmeiras to join Belenenses, although he was only there for a short time, playing three Portuguese League matches. By late February he was playing for Corinthians, and he scored two goals for them in the 1991 Copa Libertadores.

After leaving Corinthians he played for Fortaleza, and he then had spells in Japan with Shimizu S-Pulse and Shonan Bellmare.

== International career ==
Mirandinha won four caps for the Brazil national team, all in 1987, with his only international goal coming against England in a 1–1 draw during the 1987 Rous Cup.

== Post-playing career ==
As of July 2013 he was a director at Maguary, who were playing in the third division of the Campeonato Cearense. In 2014 he was the manager of the Castelão stadium in Fortaleza, a host venue in the 2014 FIFA World Cup.

== Career statistics ==
Appearances and goals by club, season and competition
Club	Season	League			National cup (Note: Includes FA Cup, Copa do Brasil, Emperor's Cup.)		League cup (Note: Includes League Cup, J.League Cup.)		Continental		Other		Total	
Club	Season	Division	Apps	Goals	Apps	Goals	Apps	Goals	Apps	Goals	Apps	Goals	Apps	Goals
Newcastle United	1987–88	First Division	26	11	2	0	2	1	—		2 (Note: Two appearances, one goal in Full Members Cup)	1	32	13
Newcastle United	1988–89	First Division	28	9	3	1	2	1	—		2 (Note: One appearance in Full Members Cup, one appearance in Football League Centenary Trophy)	0	35	11
Newcastle United	Total		54	20	5	1	4	2	0	0	4	1	67	24
Belenenses	1990–91	Primeira Divisão	3	2							—		3	2
Corinthians	1991	Série A							4	2	—			
Shimizu S-Pulse	1992	J1 League	—				8	2	—		—		8	2
Bellmare Hiratsuka (Note: "Fujita Industries" until 1994)	1993	Football League	17	12			3	2			—		20	14
Bellmare Hiratsuka	1994	J1 League	13	2			1	0	—		—		14	2
Bellmare Hiratsuka	Japan		30	14			4	2	0	0	0	0	34	16
Career total														
