= Parnaíba =

- city
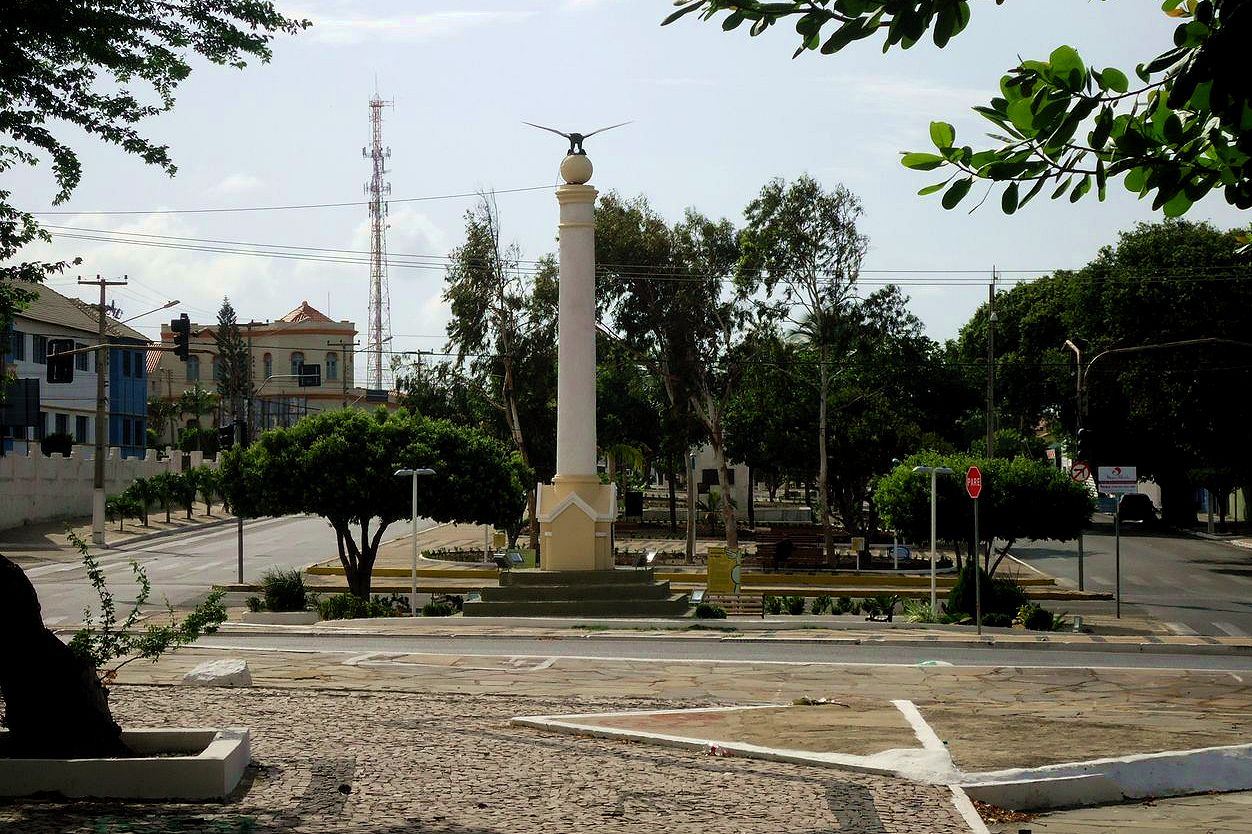
- Monumento da Águia

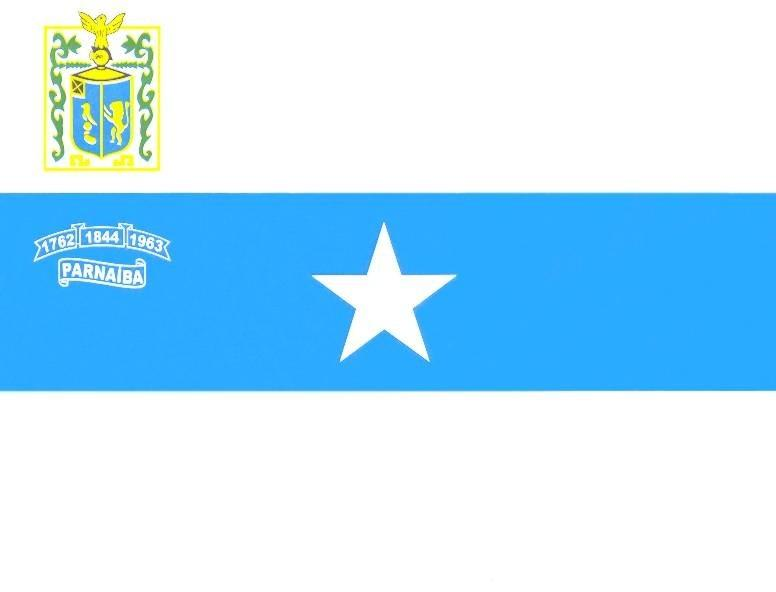
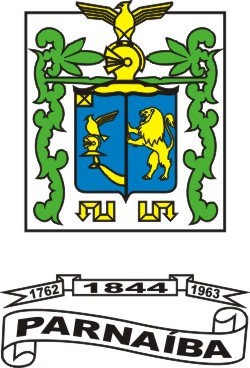
- Flag Coat of arms
- Nickname: Princess of Igaraçu
- Location of Parnaíba in Piauí

- Location in Brazil
- Coordinates: 02°54′18″S 41°46′37″W
- Country: Brazil
- Region: Northeast
- State: Piauí
- Founded: August 14, 1844

Government
  - Mayor: Francisco Emanuel (Progressistas)

Area
  - city: 435.564 km^{2} (168.172 sq mi)

Population (2022 Census)
  - city: 162,159
  - Estimate (2025): 170,491
  - Density: 372.297/km^{2} (964.244/sq mi)
  - Metro: 219,031
- Demonym: Parnaibano
- Time zone: UTC-3
- Postal code: 64200-001 to 64219-999
- Area code: +55 86
- Website: www.parnaiba.pi.gov.br

Parnaíba (Portuguese: [paʁnaˈibɐ]) is a city in the Brazilian state of Piauí. Having a population of over 170,491 inhabitants according to IBGE's 2025 estimates, it is the second most populous city in the state, after the capital Teresina. It is one of the four coastal municipalities in Piauí (besides Ilha Grande, Luís Correia, and Cajueiro da Praia), all of which make up the city's metropolitan area.

Besides the natural environment, Parnaíba has historical value for Piauí; near Porto das Barcas several historic buildings reflect the importance of Parnaíba, coming at that time to be more important than the former capital Oeiras and taking up same references in Europe.

== History ==
In 1699, the region between the Igaraçu river and the Serra da Ibiapaba, inhabited by indigenous people, was pioneered by Leonardo de Sá and his companions, who obtained a land grant on the banks of that river. Under the name of Parnaíba, toponym that arose, according to some, from the desire of the first explorers of Piauí to pay homage to the then São Paulo district of Parnaíba, and, according to others, from the Tupi word that means 'great unnavigable river'. From 1761 onwards its development began. At that time, there was a charqueada owned by Domingos Dias da Silva, Portuguese founder of Porto das Barcas and pioneer in the region, mainly in the commercial and agricultural sectors. The governor of the province, colonel João Pereira Caldas, was installed in the municipality in 1762, which has a name of São João da Parnaíba.

== Geography ==
Parnaíba is located at Parnaíba River basin and is cut by that which divides into several arms forming the famous Delta of the only offshore of the Americas and the third largest in the world, second only to the Nile in Egypt and Mekong in Southeast Asia. One of these arms is the "river" Igaraçu where the port is located from barcase. Most of the city is on the right bank of the Igaraçu since the rest is in Big Island of Santa Isabel, now in Parnaíba River delta. The only beach of the city is the Pedra do Sal, ideal for surfing, kite surfing and wind surfing. Another source is the city Portinho Lagoon, one of the most famous tourist attractions, that due to the advance of the dunes may disappear. The city is located on land Cenozoic Quaternary and has altitude of about 5 meters in areas of the urban center which is away from the coast. It lies on the coastal plain and the topography is fairly regular. Mangrove vegetation and scrub predominates in the creeks and on river banks, coca crops in the rest of the territory. Megathermal semi-humid tropical climate predominates in the region, with high rate of rainfall due to the mass action Equatorial Atlantic during the months from January to June.

The municipality contains part of the 313,800-hectare (775,000-acre) Delta do Parnaíba Environmental Protection Area, created in 1996.

== Economy ==
Second city in the state of Piauí, Parnaíba distinguished by beautiful landscape, marked by Carnaubais, and the relatively moderate commercial and industrial activity. Parnaíba is located on the right bank of the "river" Igaraçu, which actually is the southernmost arm of the Parnaíba River delta. Located near the coast, altitude 13m, lies 366 km from Teresina, the state capital of Piauí. The main economic activity is the export of Parnaíba carnauba wax, babassu oil, coconut oil, sheet jaborandi, cashew nuts, cotton and leather. The municipality also has industries of food and perfumery. For example, Vegeflora, Delta Cooperative Milk Long, Cobrasil, Q-Odor recycling Tannery Romao, Q-Odor and PVP SA. Parnaíba was honored with a zone processamente exports (ZPE). An area reserved for companies wishing to settle in the city produce for Brazil and the world. The Capital of Lower Parnaíba also has been increasing in agribusiness with production of camaraoes, fruit and milk. Tourism is gaining strength, and the city center of "rota das emoções" which is a tourist route between Lencois Maranhão, Parnaíba Delta Jericoacoara. In south of the city tourists can visit the National Park Ubajara (CE) and Sete Cidades (PI). There are several projects of resorts and hotels to be built in the city and region. In 2009, Parnaíba was considered the most dynamic city in the state, 5th in the Northeast and 32 of Brazil. It was the fastest growing city of Brazil in 2011, with a recorded growth rate of 229%. The city has invested R$34 million in 2011 from R$10.3 million that were applied in 2010.

== Tourism ==
=== Main sights ===
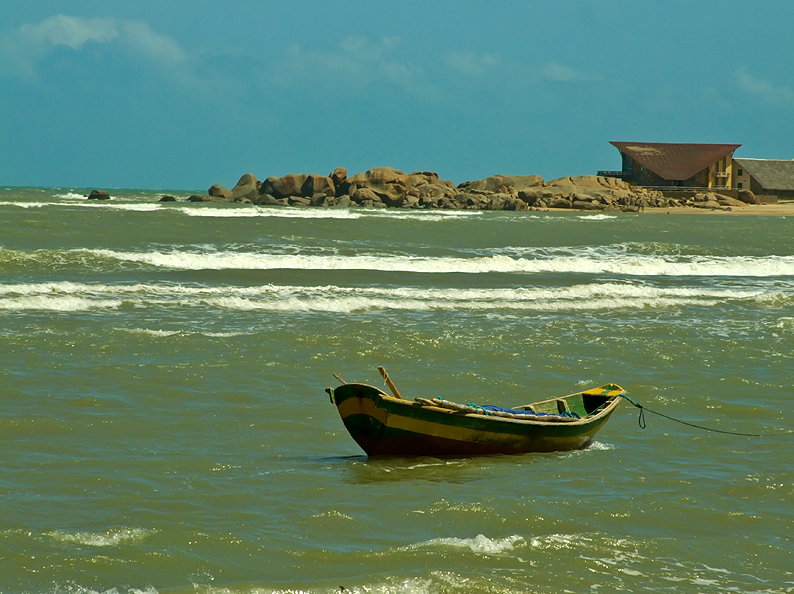
Pedra do Sal beach

- Parnaíba Delta is situated between the Brazilian states of Maranhão and Piauí, Rio Parnaíba is one of the few rivers in the world with mouth open sea delta, formed by the Rio Parnaíba, which has 1485 km in length, the Delta of opens into five arms, with 73 river islands, their lush, full of dunes, mangroves and river islands, idyllic setting ensures that region of Maranhão and Piauí.
- Pedra do Sal beach, being located 15 km from the county seat parnaibano, the beach of Pedra do Sal is in the Ilha Grande de Santa Isabel, river island in the Parnaíba Delta. Access is available through the PI-116, is divided into two parts: the quiet side has few waves, is slow moving and good conditions for fishing and rest and hand busy is useful for sports like surfing and hang gliding. The beach is also an installed wind power plant with 18 MW production, strengthening the energy matrix of the city.
- Portinho Lagoon is one of the most beautiful landscapes of Piauí and the advantage that the blue waters can turn green depending on the light of the sun, the dunes, surrounding a whiff of fresh water, ideal for practicing water sports on banana boat, jet skiing and windsurfing.
- Porto das Barcas, the origin of the City of Parnaíba is directly connected, located at Riverside Igaraçu arm Parnaíba River, Porto is right off the bridge that connects the city to the Big Island of Santa Isabel. Constructions of the 18th century played a preponderant role in the economy of the region, being built huge warehouses used for storage of imported goods and export, especially trade with Portugal, Spain, England and Germany.

== Infrastructures ==
Parnaíba has an international airport with a runway of 2500m. The airport and administered by INFRAERO. Starting on December 30, 2020, Azul airlines, the third largest airline carrier in Brazil, will fly every Sundays and Wednesdays straight (3 hours and 10 minutes) from Campinas (São Paulo) to Parnaíba (Piauí), these flights from Campinas (main Hub of Azul in Brazil) to Parnaíba will enable people from Lisboa, Miami, Orlando, Buenos Aires, Paris and southeast, mid-west, and south Brasil plus Manaus and Belém to arrive faster in Parnaíba Delta and Piauí cost much faster. In October 2021, the Government of Piauí announced that Voepass airlines started this Friday (29th) the sale of airline tickets to two destinations that make up the Rota das Emoções: Parnaíba, in Piauí, and Jericoacoara, in Ceará. The routes will be made from the cities of Fortaleza (CE) and Teresina (PI), both of which are part of the list of new cities operated by the company.

City also has a large irrigated perimeter, which has attracted people from different parts of Brazil to produce.

Two shopping centers, cinemas and bowling, and a theater are being erected in the city in the main boulevard, the Avenida São Sebastião.

== Sports ==
=== Sports Stadiums ===
- Stadium Petrônio Portela, considered the birthplace of football in Parnaíba, the history of the Petrônio Portela stadium is intertwined with the history of Parnahyba. Built in the 1920s by Casa Inglesa, it was originally named Estádio Internacional. Its architectural style similar to English stadiums at the time, unique in Brazil, was a symbol of the glamour of the Parnahybano Championship disputes in the last century.
- Stadium Pedro Alelaf, formerly Mão Santa Stadium, known by the nickname "Piscinão", has a capacity for 4,700 people.
- Gymnasium Verdinho, stadium owned by Federação das Indústrias do Piauí (FIEPI), has a capacity of 4,500 people.

=== Football Teams ===
- Parnahyba Sport Club (PSC), is the biggest soccer club in the city of Parnaíba and with the biggest fans, being known with the nickname of Tubarão do Litoral. Founded in 1913, the club is the oldest in the state.
- Ferroviário Atlético Club (FAC), nicknamed Ferão, it was founded in 1946 by employees of the then Estrada de Ferro Central do Piauí.
- Paysandu Esporte Clube, founded on August 12, 1928, by Cauby, Moarcy and Pharmacy, from Belém, it was known as "brasinha", but has been without professional activities since 2001.

== Climate ==
Climate data for Parnaíba (1981–2010)
Month	Jan	Feb	Mar	Apr	May	Jun	Jul	Aug	Sep	Oct	Nov	Dec	Year
Mean daily maximum °C (°F)	32.1 (89.8)	31.4 (88.5)	30.9 (87.6)	30.9 (87.6)	31.2 (88.2)	31.7 (89.1)	32.2 (90.0)	33.4 (92.1)	33.9 (93.0)	33.7 (92.7)	33.6 (92.5)	33.2 (91.8)	32.4 (90.3)
Mean daily minimum °C (°F)	23.4 (74.1)	23.2 (73.8)	23.1 (73.6)	23.0 (73.4)	22.8 (73.0)	22.2 (72.0)	21.8 (71.2)	22.3 (72.1)	23.1 (73.6)	23.6 (74.5)	23.9 (75.0)	24.0 (75.2)	23.0 (73.4)
Average precipitation mm (inches)	121.8 (4.80)	180.7 (7.11)	259.2 (10.20)	269.2 (10.60)	173.7 (6.84)	50.1 (1.97)	40.9 (1.61)	4.3 (0.17)	1.1 (0.04)	0.9 (0.04)	3.7 (0.15)	27.5 (1.08)	1,133.1 (44.61)
Average precipitation days (≥ 1.0 mm)	9	13	17	17	12	5	4	1	0	0	0	3	81
Mean monthly sunshine hours	199.2	165.7	162.4	168.2	211.8	239.3	262.1	298.2	290.6	299.6	276.3	244.2	2,817.6
Source: Instituto Nacional de Meteorologia

== See also ==
- Castle of Tó
- Parnaíba-Prefeito Dr. João Silva Filho International Airport
