= Água Doce do Maranhão =

Coordinates: 2.84083°S 42.1119°W

- Municipality
- Interactive map of Água Doce do Maranhão
- Country: Brazil
- Region: Nordeste
- State: Maranhão
- Mesoregion: Leste Maranhense

Population (2020)
  - Total: 12,652
- Time zone: UTC−3 (BRT)

Água Doce do Maranhão is a municipality in the state of Maranhão in the Northeast region of Brazil.

The municipality contains part of the 313,800 hectares (775,000 acres) Delta do Parnaíba Environmental Protection Area, created in 1996.

== See also ==
- List of municipalities in Maranhão
