= Barroquinha =

Municipality in Ceará, Brazil

- Municipality
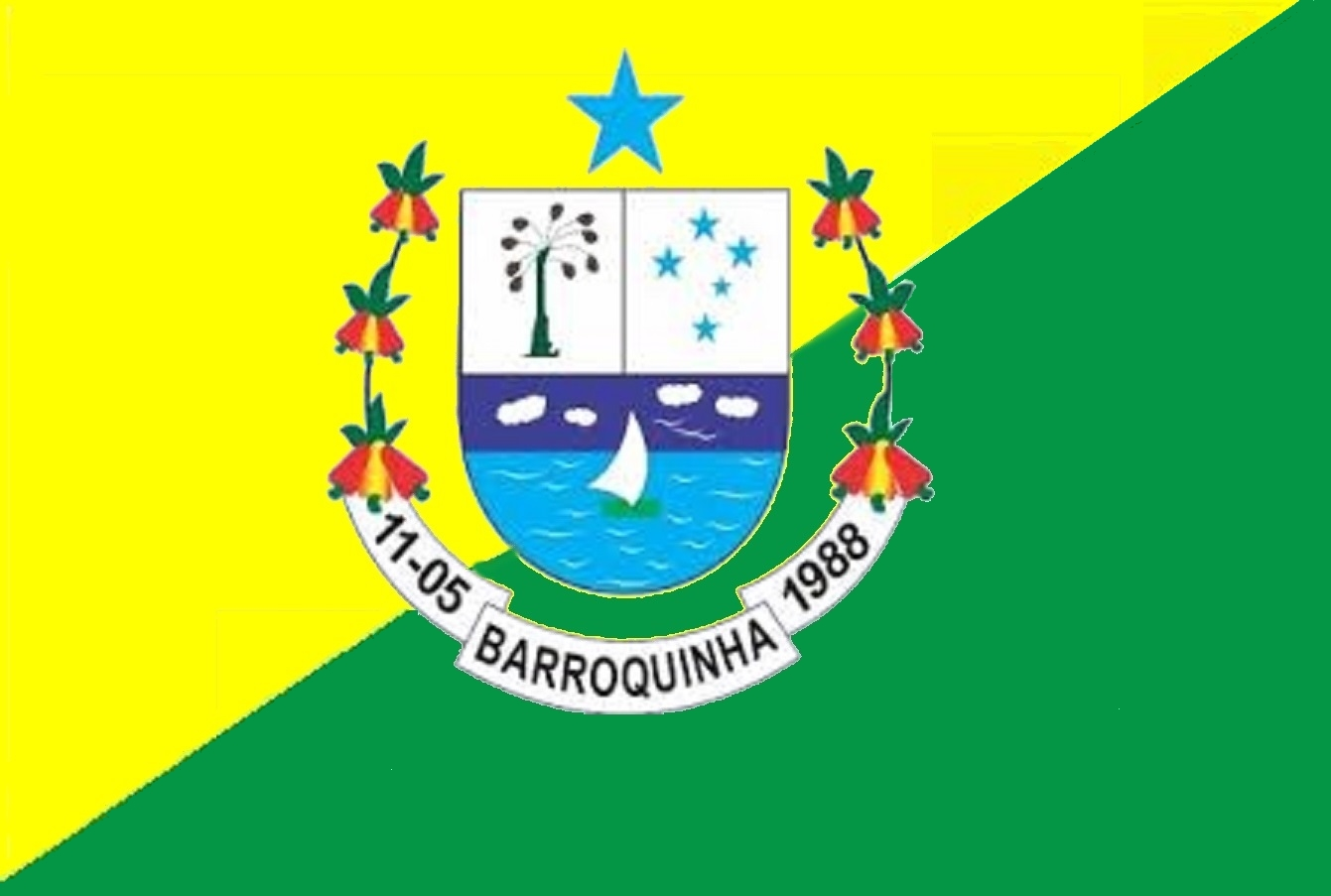
- Flag

- Location of Barroquinha in Ceará

- Location within Brazil Location within South America
- Coordinates: 3°01′08″S 41°08′13″W
- Country: Brazil
- Region: Northeast
- State: Ceará
- Founded: 11 May 1988

Government
  - Mayor: Jaime Veras Silva Filho (PSD) (2025-2028)
  - Vice Mayor: Carmem Lúcia de Sousa Veras (PSD) (2025-2028)

Area
  - Total: 385.583 km^{2} (148.874 sq mi)
- Elevation: 16 m (52 ft)

Population (2022)
  - Total: 14,567
  - Density: 37.78/km^{2} (97.8/sq mi)
- Demonym: Barroquinhense (Brazilian Portuguese)
- Time zone: UTC-03:00 (Brasília Time)
- Postal code: 62410-000, 62414-000
- HDI (2010): 0.571 – medium
- Website: barroquinha.ce.gov.br

Barroquinha is a municipality in the Brazilian state of Ceará. The population was estimated at 15,044 in 2020.

The municipality contains part of the 313,800 hectares (775,000 acres) Delta do Parnaíba Environmental Protection Area, created in 1996.
