= Castle of Tó =

Tower in Parnaíba, Brazil

Castle of Tó (or Castle Tóh) is a tower on the point of the city of Parnaíba. It is a small castle which is situated in the main square. It bears the crest of the Dias da Silva family.
