= Delta do Parnaíba Environmental Protection Area =

Environmental protection area in Brazil

- Área de Proteção Ambiental Delta do Parnaíba
- IUCN category V (protected landscape/seascape)
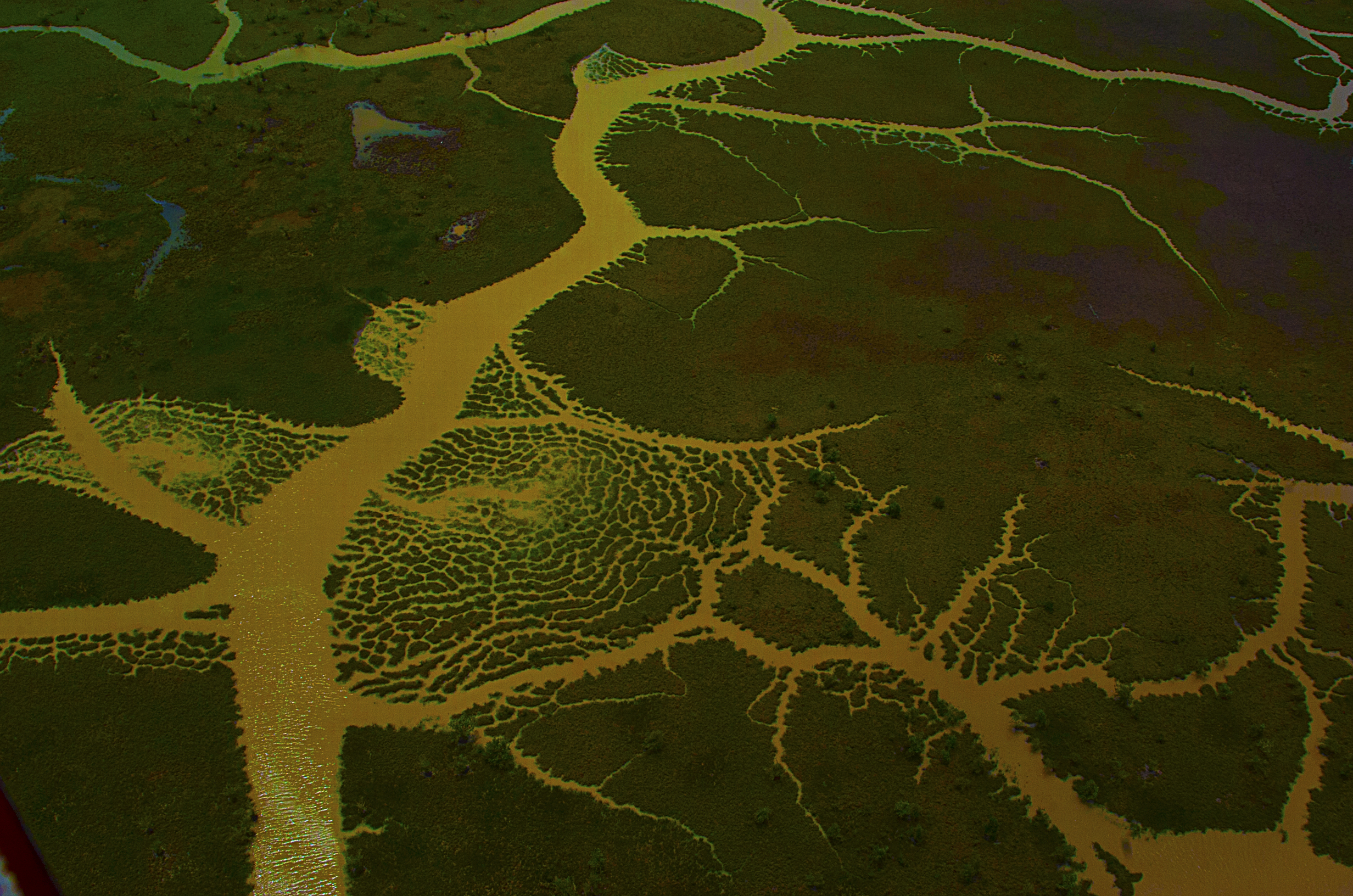
- Parnaíba Delta

- Location within Brazil
- Nearest city: Parnaíba, Piauí
- Coordinates: 2°48′26″S 41°48′36″W
- Area: 313,800 ha (1,212 sq mi)
- Designation: Environmental protection area
- Created: 28 August 1996
- Administrator: ICMBio

The Delta do Parnaíba Environmental Protection Area (Portuguese: Área de Proteção Ambiental Delta do Parnaíba) is a federally-administered environmental protection area that covers parts of the coasts of the states of Maranhão, Piauí and Ceará, Brazil.

== Location ==
In Maranhão the Delta do Parnaíba Environmental Protection Area (APA) covers parts of the municipalities of Água Doce do Maranhão, Araioses, Paulino Neves and Tutóia. In Piauí the APA covers parts of the municipalities of Cajueiro da Praia, Ilha Grande, Luís Correia and Parnaíba. Parnaíba is the second largest city in Piauí state and has an airport with 2 weekly (Sunday and Wednesday) flights from Campinas (São Paulo) by Azul Linhas Aereas. In 2021, VoePass airlines together Gol airlines started selling tickets (daily flights) to Parnaíba from Fortaleza (Gol 's Hub in the Northeast Brazil) and Teresina (capital of Piauí state). In Ceará the APA covers parts of the municipalities of Barroquinha and Chaval. It has a total area of 313,800 hectares (775,000 acres).

The APA contains the Delta do Parnaíba Marine Extractive Reserve. To the southeast it adjoins the federal Serra da Ibiapaba Environmental Protection Area. It adjoins the Lençóis Maranhenses National Park to the north and the Upaon-Açu/Miritiba/Alto Preguiças Environmental Protection Area to the west.

== History ==
The Delta do Parnaíba Environmental Protection Area was created by federal decree on 28 August 1996 to protect the deltas of the Parnaíba, Timonha and Ubatuba Rivers, their fauna and flora and dune complex. It is classed as IUCN protected area category V: protected landscape / seascape. The APA aims to protect remnants of alluvial forest and water resources, and to improve the quality of life of the resident populations through guidance and discipline of economic activities. It also aims to promote ecological tourism and environmental education, and to preserve local cultures and traditions. It is administered by the Chico Mendes Institute for Biodiversity Conservation. The management plan was published in 1998. The consultative council was created on 10 December 2007.

== Environment ==
The interior of the Parnaíba delta contain large fields of mobile dunes, mostly with a NE-SW orientation. Some are partially stabilized by creepers and shrubs. The dunes are unstable due to the action of tides, winds and rivers, and to recent movements of the crustal floor. Average temperatures are fairly constant through the year, from 25 to 27 °C (77 to 81 °F). Annual rainfall is about 1,200 millimetres (47 in), with 80% falling from January to May. The driest period is from August to November.

The region is one where the caatinga formations to the east meet cerrado to the southwest and marine systems to the north. There are high levels of biodiversity, rarity and endemism. Vegetation includes coastal caatinga, restinga, mangrove and flood zones with carnaúba palms. Protected species in the APA include red-handed howler (Alouatta belzebul) and smalltooth sawfish (Pristis pectinata). Threats include conversion of habitat for farming and aquaculture, and uncontrolled extraction of resources.

== Sources ==
- APA Delta do Parnaíba (in Portuguese), ICMBio: Chico Mendes Institute for Biodiversity Conservation, archived from the original on 2017-02-11
- APA Delta do Parnaíba (Federal) (in Portuguese), ISA: Instituto Socioambiental
- IBAMA (1998), Plano de gestão e diagnóstico geoambiental e socioeconômico da APA do Delta de Parnaíba (PDF) (in Portuguese), Fortaleza: IBAMA: Ministério do Meio Ambiente, Recursos Hídricos e da Amazônia Legal, Instituto de Estudos e Pesquisas Sociais da UECE - IEPS, archived from the original (PDF) on 2017-02-11
- IBAMA (2006), Sumário final do Projeto-Piloto Zoneamento Ecológico-Econômico do Baixo Rio Parnaíba (PDF) (in Portuguese)
- Unidade de Conservação: Área de Proteção Ambiental Delta do Parnaíba (in Portuguese), MMA: Ministério do Meio Ambiente
- Unidades de Conservação (in Portuguese), ZEE: Governo do Estado do Maranhão, archived from the original on 2017-01-29
