= Cape Orange =

Cape in Brazil

Coordinates: 04°26′31″N 51°31′07″W

Cape Orange (Portuguese: Cabo Orange) is a cape on the coast of Brazil, separated from the coast of French Guiana by a large bay watered by the estuary of the Oyapock River (Portuguese: Rio Oiapoque). Cape Orange is the northernmost point of the Brazilian state of Amapá. It is located in an area of tidal marshland protected in Cape Orange National Park.

In Brazil, both Cape Orange and the nearby mouth of the Oyapock River are often erroneously quoted as being the country's northernmost point, and until the mid- to late 20th century this information could even be found in many Brazilian schoolbooks. Actually, Brazil's most northerly point is far inland and hundreds of kilometres from there, on Monte Caburaí in the state of Roraima, almost a full degree more to the north. Cape Orange is indeed the northernmost point of the Brazilian coastline; the cape's western coastline ends at the Oyapock estuary, whose mouth marks the end of the Brazilian coast.

It is the only place in the Brazilian coast where the American flamingo (Phoenicopterus ruber) nests.

== See also ==
- Extreme points of Brazil
