= Paulino Neves =

Coordinates: 2°43′S 42°33′W

- Municipality
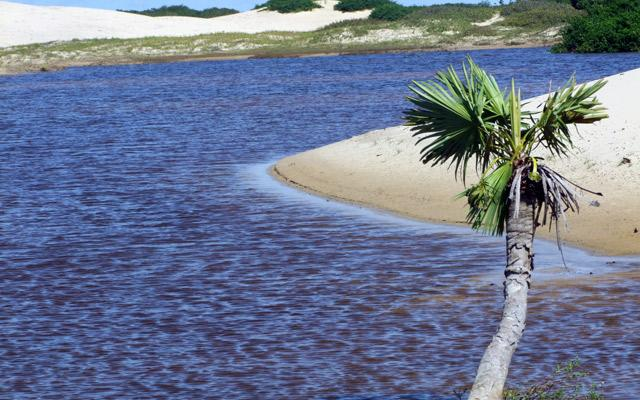

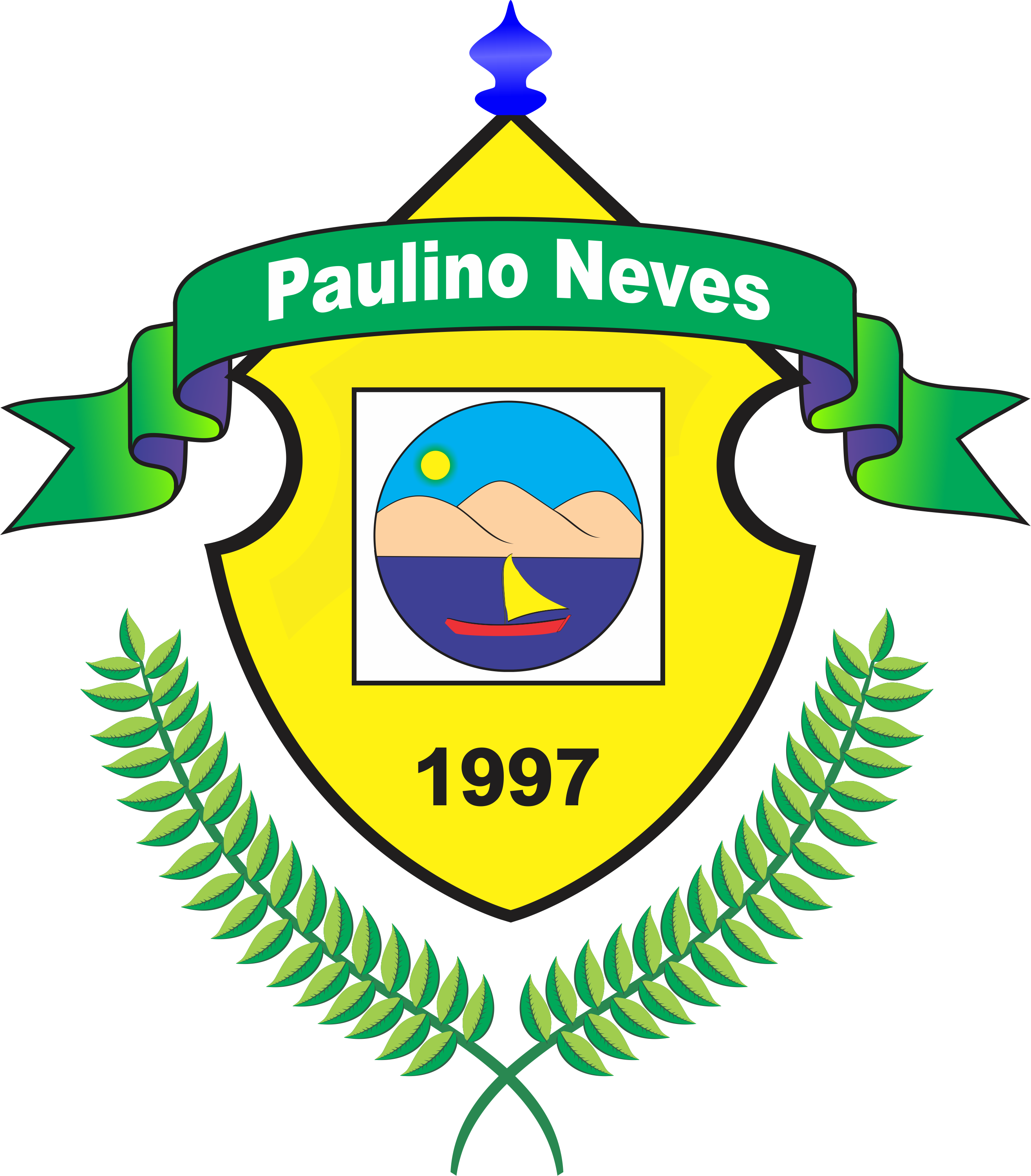
- Flag Coat of arms
- Interactive map of Paulino Neves
- Country: Brazil
- Region: Nordeste
- State: Maranhão
- Mesoregion: Norte Maranhense

Population (2020)
  - Total: 16,166
- Time zone: UTC−3 (BRT)

Paulino Neves is a municipality in the state of Maranhão in the Northeast region of Brazil.

The municipality contains part of the 313,800 hectares (775,000 acres) Delta do Parnaíba Environmental Protection Area, created in 1996.

== See also ==
- List of municipalities in Maranhão
