= Parnaíba-Prefeito Dr. João Silva Filho International Airport =

Parnaíba–Prefeito Dr. João Silva Filho International Airport Aeroporto Internacional de Parnaíba–Prefeito Dr. João Silva Filho
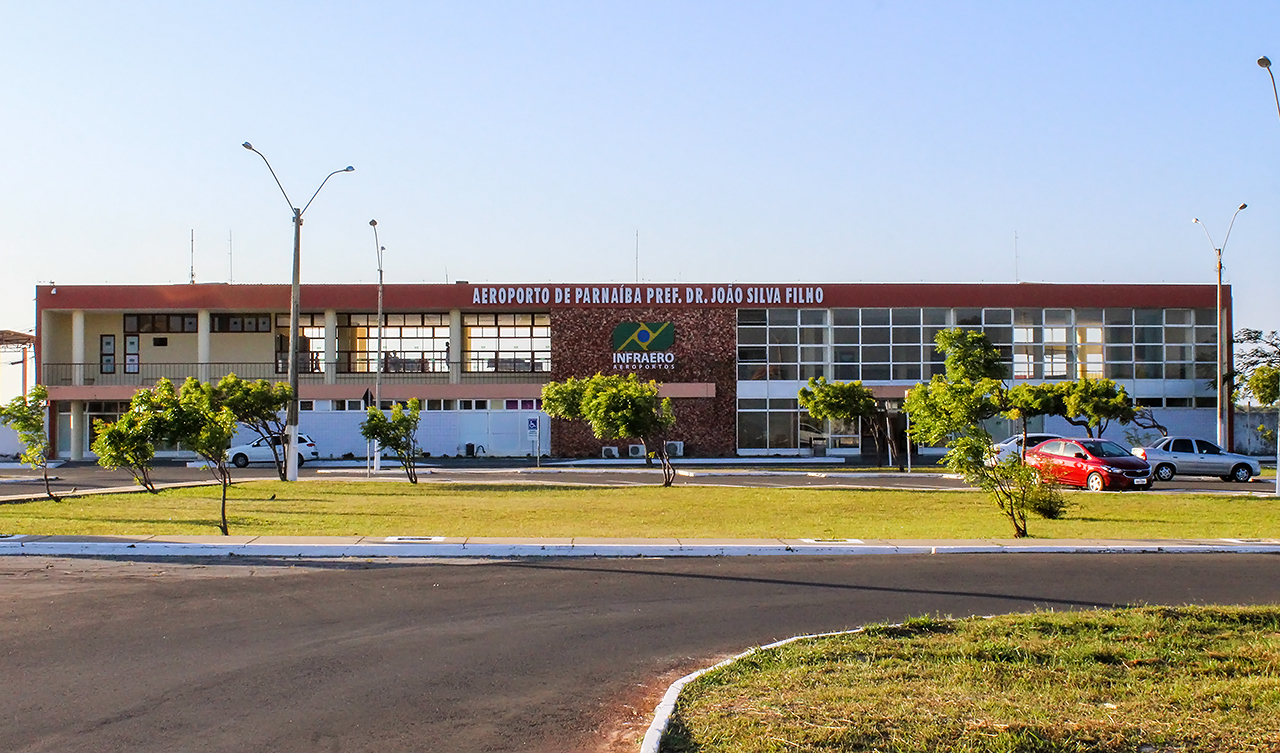
- IATA: PHB; ICAO: SBPB; LID: PI0002

Summary
- Airport type: Public
- Operator: Infraero (2004–2021); SBPB (2021–present)
- Serves: Parnaíba
- Opened: October 19, 1971
- Time zone: BRT (UTC−03:00)
- Elevation AMSL: 7 m (23 ft)
- Coordinates: 02°53′36″S 041°43′49″W

Map
- Location in Brazil

Runways
Direction	Length		Surface
Direction	m	ft	Surface
10/28	2,500	8,202	Asphalt

Statistics (2021)
- Passengers: 26,616 ▲443%
- Aircraft Operations: 1,589 ▲58%
- Metric tonnes of cargo: 12 ▼36%
- Statistics: Infraero; Sources: ANAC, DECEA

Parnaíba–Prefeito Dr. João Silva Filho International Airport (IATA: PHB, ICAO: SBPB) is the airport serving Parnaíba, Brazil. It is informally known as Santos Dumont Airport because of its architectonical similarities with Santos Dumont Airport in Rio de Janeiro. It is named after a former mayor of Parnaíba.

It is operated by SBPB.

== History ==
The airport is located on a privileged touristic area, near the municipalities of Camocim and Jericoacoara, in Ceará, the delta of river Parnaíba, in Piauí, and Lençóis Maranhenses National Park in Maranhão.

The airport was commissioned on October 19, 1971 and in 2004 Infraero became the administrator of the airport.

On November 5, 2021, the 32-year concession of the airport was auctioned and the winner was SBPB. On February 14, 2022 the contracted was signed and Infraero handed-over the administration of the airport to SBPB.

== Airlines and destinations ==
Airlines	Destinations
Azul Brazilian Airlines	Belo Horizonte–Confins, Teresina
LATAM Brasil	Fortaleza

== Access ==
The airport is located 8 km (5 mi) from downtown Parnaíba.

== See also ==
- List of airports in Brazil
