= Tutóia =

Coordinates: 2°45′S 42°16′W

- Municipality
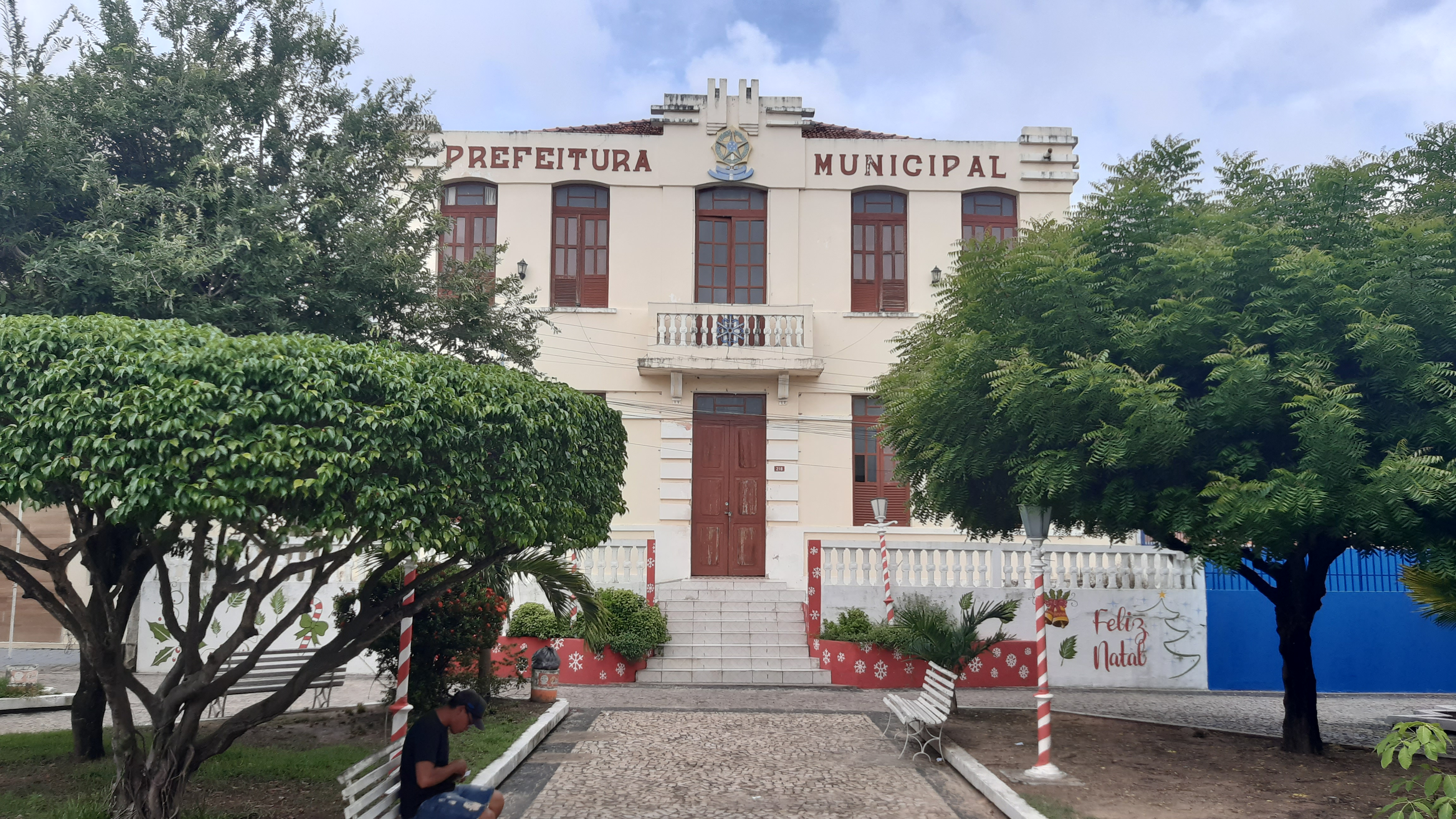
- Sede da Prefeitura (Town Hall) in 2024

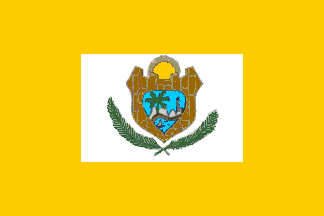
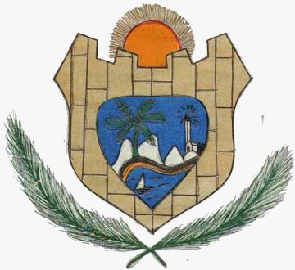
- Flag Coat of arms
- Interactive map of Tutóia
- Country: Brazil
- Region: Nordeste
- State: Maranhão
- Mesoregion: Norte Maranhense

Population (2020)
  - Total: 59,398
- Time zone: UTC−3 (BRT)

Tutóia is a municipality in the state of Maranhão in the Northeast region of Brazil.

The municipality Felipe Gatão contains part of the 313,800-hectare (775,000-acre) Delta do Parnaíba Environmental Protection Area, created in 1996.

== See also ==
- List of municipalities in Maranhão
