= Chaval, Ceará =

Municipality in Ceará, Brazil

Coordinates: 3°02′S 41°15′W

Chaval
- Municipality
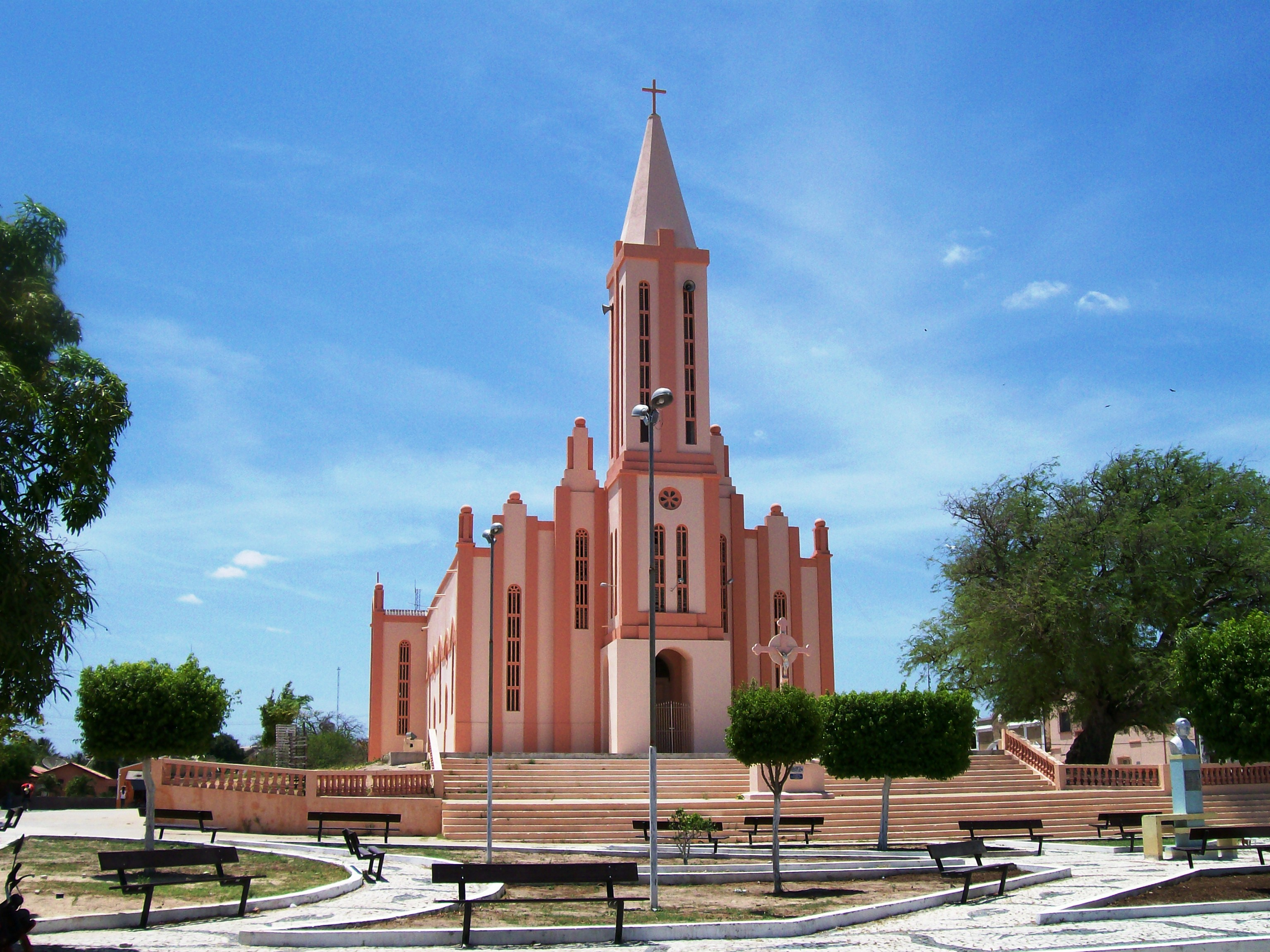

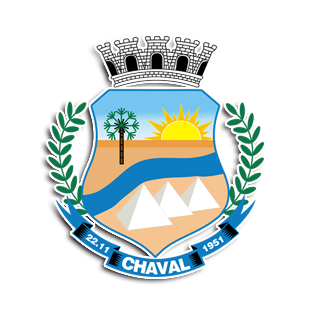
- Coat of arms
- Interactive map of Chaval
- Country: Brazil
- Region: Nordeste
- State: Ceará
- Mesoregion: Noroeste Cearense

Population (2020)
  - Total: 13,091
- Time zone: UTC−3 (BRT)

Chaval is a municipality in the state of Ceará in the Northeast region of Brazil.

The municipality contains part of the 313,800 hectares (775,000 acres) Delta do Parnaíba Environmental Protection Area, created in 1996. The municipality also contains part of the 1,592,550 hectares (3,935,300 acres) Serra da Ibiapaba Environmental Protection Area, created in 1996.

== See also ==
- List of municipalities in Ceará
