= Araioses =

Municipality in Maranhão, Brazil

- Municipality
- The Municipality of Araioses
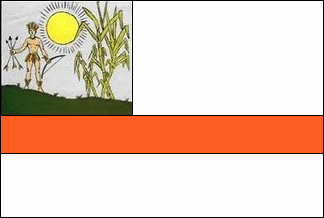
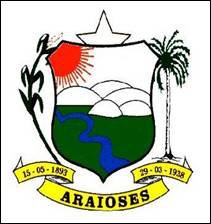
- Flag Coat of arms
- Nickname: "Portal do Delta" (River Delta's Portal)
- Location of Araioses
- Coordinates: 02°53′24″S 41°54′10″W
- State: Maranhão
- Founded: March 29, 1938

Government
  - Mayor: JOAO CANDIDO CARVALHO NETO - PDT Partido Democrático Trabalhista.

Area
  - Total: 1,782.5 km^{2} (688.2 sq mi)

Population (2022)
  - Total: 39.052
  - Density: 21.82/km^{2} (56.5/sq mi)
- Time zone: UTC−3 (BRT)
- HDI (2000): 0.521 – low
- Website: www.araioses.ma.gov.br

Araioses is the easternmost city in the Brazilian state of Maranhão. It lies near the Parnaíba River's delta, and its territory also include the Canárias, Caju, Poldros, apart from several smaller islands.

== History ==
Araioses already Village, town and village, has city status on March 29, 1938 (75 years), by State Law No. 045. The Catholic religion is predominant in the city is celebrated annually Araioses Patroness of Our Lady of the Conception of 29 November to 08 December. the mother church and several other saints at headquarters and within the municipality.

Had its origin in the village of Indians Araios, the branching of Tapuias and inhabiting the northern and eastern Maranhão Piauí. Were disseminated by the action of the Portuguese colonizers smugglers and pirates. First, however, since settled giving rise to a village that became parish, village and March 29, 1938, amounted to a city. Its economy was based on the production of cane sugar, carnauba wax-of-cotton, rice and other food. Araioses today differs from past development presents a vegetative growth in the face of globalization. The municipality is privileged by nature, is located at the vicinity of the Delta of the Americas, thus being able to develop their potential

== Geography ==
The municipality is in the northeastern state of Maranhão, and is one of the gateways to the Delta river.

The municipality contains part of the 313,800 hectares (775,000 acres) Delta do Parnaíba Environmental Protection Area, created in 1996.

The municipality of Araioses comprises an area of 1,782.5 square kilometres (688.2 sq mi). Including the mainland and island (Canary Island, Ilha do Caju, etc.). It is located at an altitude of 6 feet above sea level. It lies to the east, in the microregion of the Parnaíba Low, limited to the North by the Atlantic Ocean, to the south with the municipalities of Magallanes and San Bernardo de Almeida, the East with the Parnaíba River, and to the west with the municipalities of Water sweet and Santana do Maranhão. Its population, according to Census 2010 is 42,505 inhabitants, 12,045 in the urban and the rural area 30,460 people. Its density is 23.84 inhabitants per square kilometre (61.7/sq mi). It is currently one of the poorest municipalities in Brazil and one of the worst human development indices.

== Hymn Araioses ==
"Hail, Land of Heroes fearless What search progress and adventure, Fear not the path overdue.

All rousing with faith and bravery, Your work and your name, then Contemplate the power of the Nation Chorus Araioses, Araioses're the Land of Peace and Love ... Your people fortunate, ennobles your splendor.

Your glory is always constant Thy children await the future And the higher steps of the History of Brazil ye shalt unite; About us remain greatness Sublimated by Nature."
