= Luís Correia =

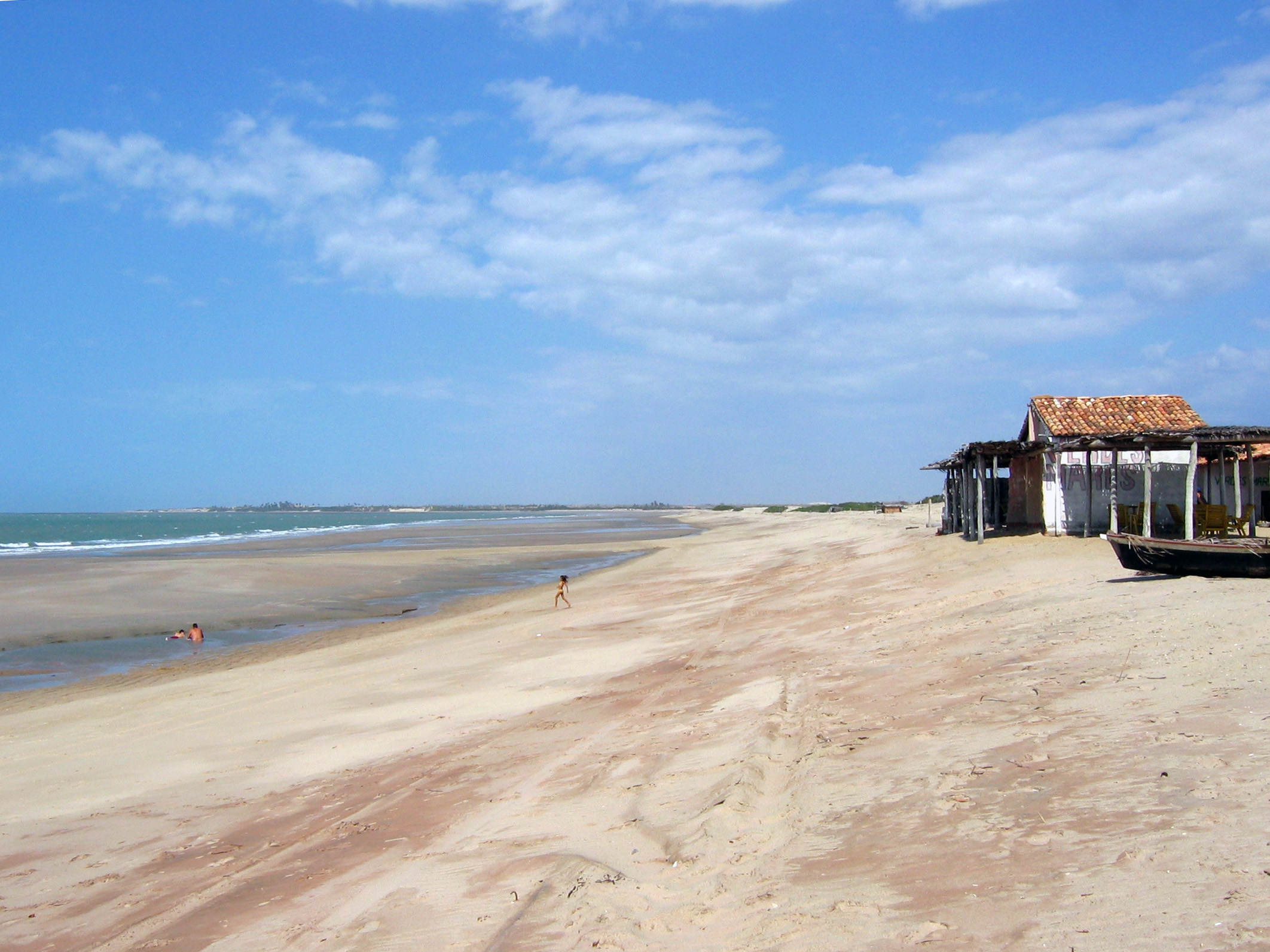
- Arrombada beach in Luís Correia

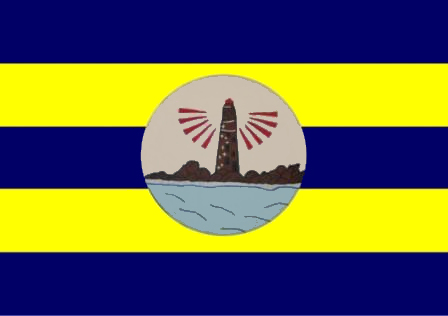
- Flag

- Location in Piauí and Brazil
- Coordinates: 02°52′44″S 41°40′01″W
- Country: Brazil
- Region: Northeast
- State: Piauí
- Settled: July 26, 1938

Government
  - Mayor: Heriberto Ribeiro de Oliveira (PPS)

Area
  - Total: 1,071.276 km^{2} (413.622 sq mi)
- Elevation: 10 m (33 ft)

Population (2020)
  - Total: 30,438
  - Density: 24/km^{2} (62/sq mi)
- Time zone: UTC−3 (BRT)

Luís Correia is one of the four coastal cities of Piauí, Brazil.

The municipality contains part of the 313,800-hectare (775,000-acre) Delta do Parnaíba Environmental Protection Area, created in 1996. The municipality also contains part of the 1,592,550 hectares (3,935,300 acres) Serra da Ibiapaba Environmental Protection Area, created in 1996.
