= Ilha Grande, Piauí =

Ilha Grande
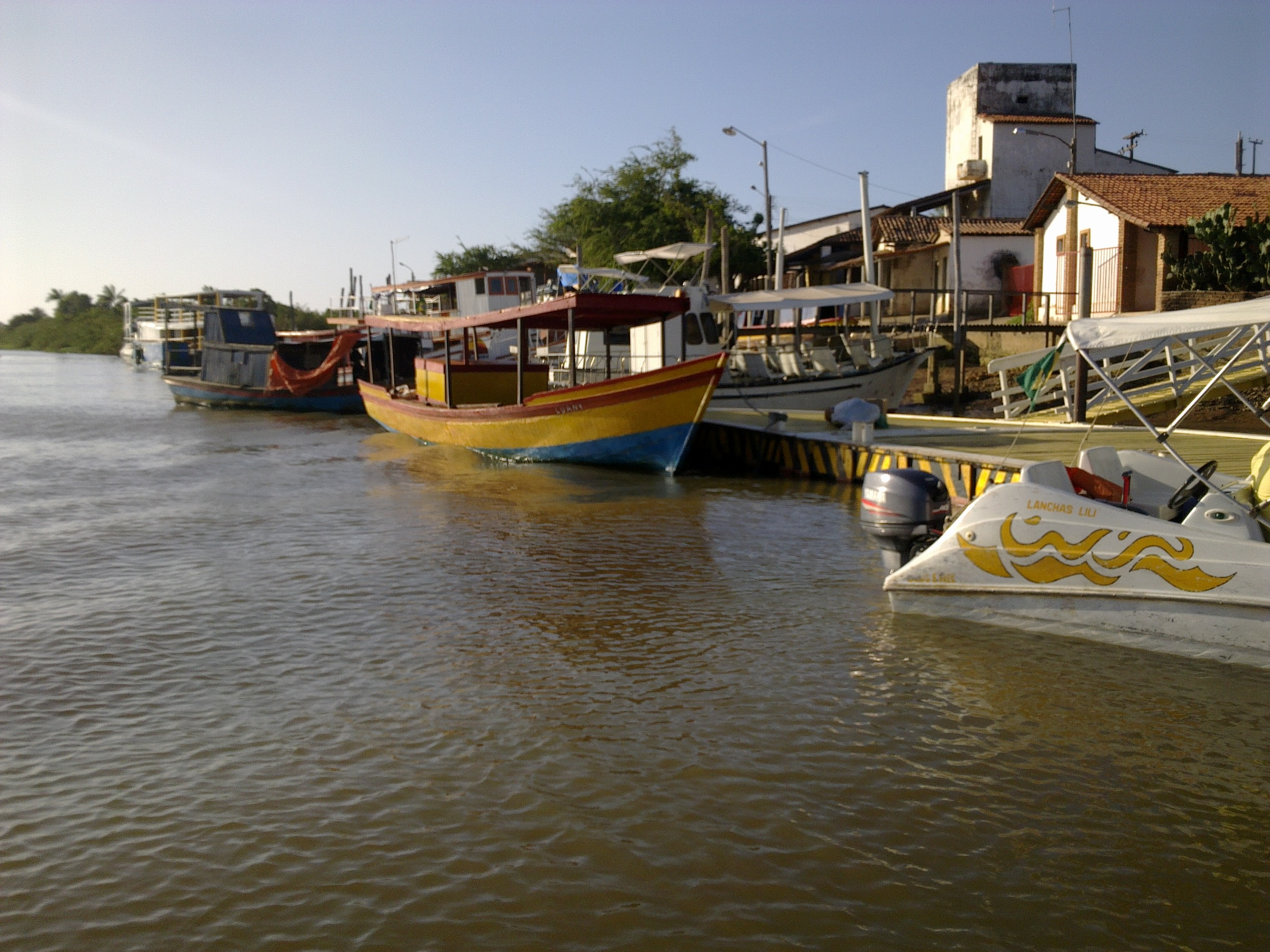

- Location in Piauí and Brazil
- Coordinates: 02°51′28″S 41°49′15″W
- Country: Brazil
- Region: Northeast
- State: Piauí
- Settled: January 26, 1997

Government
  - Mayor: Joana Darc Sertão (PSDB)

Area
  - Total: 134.318 km^{2} (51.860 sq mi)
- Elevation: 10 m (33 ft)

Population (2020)
  - Total: 9,457
  - Density: 64.4/km^{2} (167/sq mi)
- Time zone: UTC−3 (BRT)

Ilha Grande is one of the four coastal cities of Piauí, Brazil. It is also the northernmost city of the state.

The municipality contains part of the 313,800-hectare (775,000-acre) Delta do Parnaíba Environmental Protection Area, created in 1996.
