= Environmental governance in Brazil =

Environmental governance is a concept in environmental policy that steers markets, technology and society towards sustainability. It considers social, economic and environmental aspects of its policies.

Brazil is developing at a very fast rate. Currently, it's only out-performed by countries such as China and India, both in terms of economic growth and its recovery rate after the 2008 financial crisis.

The saying that "Brazil is the country of the future...and it always will be" has haunted Brazil for decades. But economic policy changes made since the founding of the New Republic have allowed Brazil to gain international confidence. Brazil is no longer referred to as a developing country, but as an emerging country, a newly industrialised country and a member of the BRIC (Brazil, Russia, India, and China) economies. Additionally, Brazil has developed into a major oil producer. Relying heavily on their domestic industry, in 2019 50% of all power produced and used within Brazil came from oil. However, Brazil is more known internationally for their oil and petroleum exports. The country produces 4.28 million barrels of oil a day, making them responsible for 4% of the world oil production. As a term, oil encompasses more than just crude oil and petroleum, but also biofuels.

The extraction of natural resources is coming at a price for the natural environment. Former Environment Minister Marina Silva resigned in 2008 as she felt the Brazilian government was prioritizing the interests of big businesses and the economy, and felt she was fighting a losing battle in protecting Brazil's environment, including the Amazon rainforest.

Despite these claims, Brazil has been praised for its environmental sustainability efforts and attempts to reduce its carbon emissions. The Brazilian government created the Ministry of the Environment (MMA) in 1985 and following this, organisations such as Brazilian Institute of Environment and Renewable Natural Resources (IBAMA), created in 1989, work to protect the natural environment. Brazil has also taken a front seat with regards to global environmental governance by jointly creating and presiding over the Megadiverse Like-Minded Countries Group, which includes 70% of the world's living biodiversity and 45% of the world's population.

== National environmental policy ==
In 1981, the Brazilian government put into force the National Environmental Policy (NEP), through Law No. 6938. The main objective of this policy was to establish standards to make sustainable development possible and ensuring greater protection for the environment. The NEP covered many environmental issues, including the definition of standards, licensing, environmental impact assessments, special areas for preservation, incentives for cleaner production, and environmental zoning. The guidelines of this policy were developed through standards and plans to guide public bodies of the Brazilian federation, in accordance with the ten principles stated in Article 2 of Law 6938. These principles are as follows:

- Government action in maintaining the ecological balance, considering the environment as a public asset to be necessarily guaranteed and protected, in view of collective use;
- The rational use of soil, subsoil, water and air;
- Planning and supervision of the use of environmental resources;
- Protection of ecosystems, the preservation of representative areas;
- Control and zoning of polluting or potentially polluting activities;
- Incentives to study and research technologies for the rational use and protection of environmental resources;
- Monitoring the state of environmental quality;
- Restoration of degraded areas;
- Protection of areas threatened with degradation;
- Environmental education at all levels of education, including community education, intended to enable them to participate actively in environmental protection

The twelve instruments of the National Environmental Policy used to promote environment protection are presented in Article 9 of the Law, and are as follows:

- Establishment of environmental quality standards;
- Environmental zoning;
- Environmental impact assessments;
- Licensing and review of effective or potentially polluting activities;
- Incentives for production and installation of equipment and the creation or uptake of technology designed to improve environmental quality;
- The creation of special protected areas by the federal, state and municipal governments, such as environmental protection areas of significant ecological interest and extractive reserves; (Writing amended by Law No. 7804 of 18.07.89)
- The national system of environmental information;
- The Federal Technical Register of Activities and Instrument of Environmental Defense;
- Disciplinary penalties for the failure to put in place measures necessary for prevention and correction of environmental degradation.
- Establishment of the Report of Environmental Quality, to be published annually by IBAMA (Item added by Law No. 7.804 of 18.07.89)
- To ensure the provision of information relating to the environment, and ensuring the Government produces them when they are absent; (Item added by Law No. 7.804 of 18.07.89)
- The Federal Technical Registry of potentially polluting activities and/or ones that use environmental resources. (Item added by Law No. 7.804 of 18.07.89)

== National environment system ==
The NEP created the National Environment System (SISNAMA), which brought together agencies and environmental institutions of the Union, and whose primary purpose was to put in place the principles and norms imposed by the constitution. The head of this system's structure was the National Government Council, the top advisory body, of the Brazilian President, to formulate guidelines and national environmental policies. Below this, the National Environment Council (CONAMA) advised the national government and deliberated over rules and standards suitable for protecting the environment, which must be followed by state and municipal governments. Following this comes the Ministry of the Environment (MMA), which planned, coordinated, supervised and controlled the national environmental policy and guidelines established for the environment, holding together the various agencies and entities that comprise the SISNAMA. Tied to the MMA, the Brazilian Institute of Environment and Renewable Natural Resources (IBAMA) formulated, coordinated, supervised, managed, promoted and enforced the NEP and the preservation and conservation of natural resources. And finally, the local municipal and state agencies responsible for inspecting environmentally degrading activities and for implementing programs, projects and monitoring activities harmful to the environment.

== Challenges ==
Brazil's natural environment still suffers from the effects of the aggressive policy of demographic occupation and economic development enforced by the military government from 1964 to 1985. The aim of this was to ease the population pressure in the heavily populated southeast region of Brazil, to create jobs and make use of Brazil's vast supply of natural resources. This brought many migrants to the Amazon Basin (especially in the states of Rondônia, Mato Grosso, and Pará), and the infrastructure and town expansions that came with this migration put a lot of pressure on the Amazon, which has suffered significantly from deforestation. Reversing this is a difficult task as it involves removing a population which has now established itself in these environments and encouraging less investment and development to occur in these places. The creation of the NEP under the military government was possibly a response to environmental NGOs' constant pressure on not only the national government, but also on international creditors, in an effort to reduce further environmental degradation.

Personal interests and economic pressures are significant barriers to successful environmental governance and removing bias from decision-making is of utmost importance to sustainability. Studies have suggested that in some cases, policymakers in Brazil have used scientific evidence that supported their decisions, instead of deliberating over all the scientific knowledge available.

== ISO 14000 standards ==
An important part of establishing Brazil's competitiveness on the world market is by being in line with the global market requirements. Many of Brazil's chemical facilities have received ISO 14000 certification and several more are close to being certified. The motivation behind this is Brazil's desire to boost its image on the international market and to increase trade with foreign partners. Brazil also participates on the technical committee of the ISO 14000 standards.

== Water governance ==
=== Marine and coastal zoning ===
Environmental governance in Brazil tends to be carried out with a top-down approach, in which the government puts in place legislation that markets must abide by. This command-and-control approach has sometimes led to tensions between governments, business and local communities. An example of this is the establishment of marine and coastal protected areas in Brazil. Restrictions are often imposed on artisanal fisheries without any involvement of the local communities in the decision making, and the negative impact on the livelihood of these local communities has resulted in several conflicts. The ecological resilience of coastal fisheries is also said to be affected by the top-down approach of creating reserves. The lack of local involvement, public participation and co-management is thought to limit ecological resilience and reduce the effectiveness of the coastal reserves in protecting wildlife numbers.

=== National Water Resource Policy ===
Brazil has a vast supply of fresh water with some of the largest river basins in the world (Amazon River, Paraná River and São Francisco River). Protecting this natural resource is not only of ecological importance, but also social and economic, as many cities and populated areas of Brazil depend on them as a source of clean water. A water governance option in Brazil to manage this issue is the National Water Resource Policy (NWRP), which was established in 1997 after more than a decade of congressional discussion. The NWRP aims to promote water as a resource with economic value and "creates structures for integrated governance of all water uses at the level of the hydrographic basin – river basin councils (RBCs) – that work in tandem with more traditional management such as municipal and state water and environmental agencies". However, it has been argued that this policy has focused excessively on top-down strategies, such as the introduction of water pricing and environmental charges, instead of addressing public mobilisation, river restoration and environmental justice.

== Oil governance ==
Petrobras, the Brazilian oil company was founded in 1953 as a national company. They maintained a monopoly on the extraction, production, and refining of oil within Brazil until the 1990s, when the Cardosa Administration opened up their national oil industry to foreign investment. Today, the Brazilian federal government holds the majority ownership of Petrobras, controlling 50.26% of the company's market shares. Outside of Petrobras, the central Brazilian government controls and manages the ownership of all extraction occurring within the country's borders. Currently Brazil is the eighth largest global producer and exporter of oil, with 73% of that oil production falling under the management of Petrobras. The oil and gas industry accounts for a large portion of Brazil's annual GDP (roughly 10% of total GDP). As a producer, Brazil is unique in that 96.7% of all oil production within the country takes place off-shore, and their production capacity has been steadily increasing (with projection of further increases in the upcoming decades). It has been projected that Brazil will control nearly 50% of all off-shore drilling, some predictions amounting to 5.2 million barrels of oil produced per day by 2040.

In recent decades Petrobras has taken personal responsibility in creating a regulatory framework to govern the health, safety, and environmental impacts caused by the industry. The goal is to reduce the adverse impacts from the industry on the surrounding environment. Environmental crises like the 2000 Guanabara Bay Oil Spill and the 2019 Northeast Brazil oil spill have mobilized social movement towards environmental protection. Petrobras and other oil companies have responded with internal regulatory frameworks, both to drive consumer confidence, and to insure the longevity of the business. The Brazilian government has also created institutions responsible for the regulation and oversight of environmental damages, like the founding of the Ministry of the Environment (MMA) in 1992. Currently, Petrobras is investing in low-carbon business operations and has committed to reducing carbon emissions within their production cycle. Though, some criticize the lack of internal oversight and impartial regulation.

One of the most recent events prompting environmental governance in relation to oil was the 2019 Northeast Brazil oil spill. This spill was categorized as the largest environmental disaster experienced by the Northeast coast of Brazil. Local and artisanal fishing communities in the northeast suffered as marine life became contaminated due to the spill. Their sales declined as the sale of contaminated seafood was prohibited, as well as consumer trust in the products declined. However, local communities continued to eat the contaminated seafood, as they were unable to afford alternative food due to the loss of sales. These communities were also largely responsible for the cleanup, as the Brazilian government decentralized management, employing workers from affected regions alongside local institutional offices for the cleanup operation. The oil spill was predominantly managed through manual cleanup operations as more traditional responses to oil spills were inadequate or advised against. Meaning, personnel and community members were in direct contact with the pollutant. In Pernambuco, the Executive Secretariat for Health Surveillance of the State of Pernambuco reported 149 suspected oil poisoning cases related to the incident.

This spill challenged Brazilian oil spill management, as many of the characteristics of the oil spill were unprecedented. Brazil employs the "polluter-pays principle" in response to oil pollution, meaning the financial and criminal liabilities of oil pollution falls on the polluter. However, in the case of the 2019 oil spill, the polluter's identity was unknown. In order to employ adequate response to the spill, the Brazilian government engaged multiple environmental agencies and even created new regulatory frameworks and tools. The National Contingency Plan for Oil and Water Pollution Incidents under National Jurisdiction (NCP) was formalized 41 days after the disaster began. The Instituto Brasileiro de Meio Ambiente e Recursos Renováveis (IBAMA) was the main federal environmental agency overseeing the management of the oil spill.

Overall, the environmental disaster affected 11 states and 1009 local communities within Brazil.

== Forest governance ==
Despite the predominant top-down approach of environmental governance in Brazil, there are cases where NGOs, companies, governments, and research institutions have joined together to promote ecological restoration. The Atlantic Forest Restoration Pact (AFRP) is an example of this. The AFRP aims to restore 15 million hectares of the degraded and fragmented Atlantic Forest by 2050 by promoting: biodiversity conservation, and job growth through the restoration supply chain, and establishing incentives for landowners to comply with the Forest Act. This demonstrates environmental NGOs' use of national legislation (especially environmental zoning) to promote environmental protection and sustainability in Brazil.

== Climate change governance ==
Brazil's large industrial and economic output, together with the fact that it hosts some of the world's largest natural resources make it a key player in global climate change governance. In late 2009, Carlos Minc, the Brazilian Minister of Environment, announced plans to reduce deforestation in Brazil by 80% by 2020, which corresponds to a 40% reduction in greenhouse gas emissions. Brazil has used its growing international influence to ensure developed countries fulfil their promises of transferring technologies and financing global development, with the aim of protecting the environment and promoting sustainability.

== Technology ==
=== Life Cycle Engineering (LCE) ===
There have been suggestions of implementing LCE in order to reduce possible environmental impacts and risks to human life, while still offering economic viability and social equity. This technique uses engineering tools and concepts in order to promote greater economic sustainability. These tools include eco-design and lifecycle assessment, clean production techniques, reverse logistics, disassembly, recycling, remanufacturing, reuse and geographical information systems (GIS).

=== Biofuels ===
First-generation biofuels are made using food crops explicitly grown for fuel production, for example ethanol made from sugar cane, and are not regarded as environmentally beneficial. Advanced biofuels (2nd generation and up) however are seen as an important route to sustainable development. Brazil's Environment Minister Izabella Teixeira has said that "biofuel production in Brazil is driven by public policies that seek to increase its production in a "sustainable manner", conserving nature, creating jobs and sharing the benefits among the population".

Sustainable biofuel production involves intense agricultural activity and therefore must be carefully planned and managed. Brazil is one of the world's leading biofuel producers and importers. The Environment Minister also claimed that "the strategy of boosting ethanol and biodiesel production is founded on a combination of two important management tools and agricultural and environmental planning: Ecological and Economic Zoning and Agro-Ecological Zoning". These strategies were put in place by the NEP and the case with biofuels demonstrates how the NEP instruments can be applied successfully to the economy, whilst at the same time promoting sustainability.

== See also ==
- Brazilian Institute of Environment and Renewable Natural Resources (IBAMA)
- Deforestation in Brazil
- Deforestation of the Amazon Rainforest
- Environment of Brazil
- Environmental issues in Brazil
- Environmentalism in Rio Grande do Sul
