= Environment of Brazil =

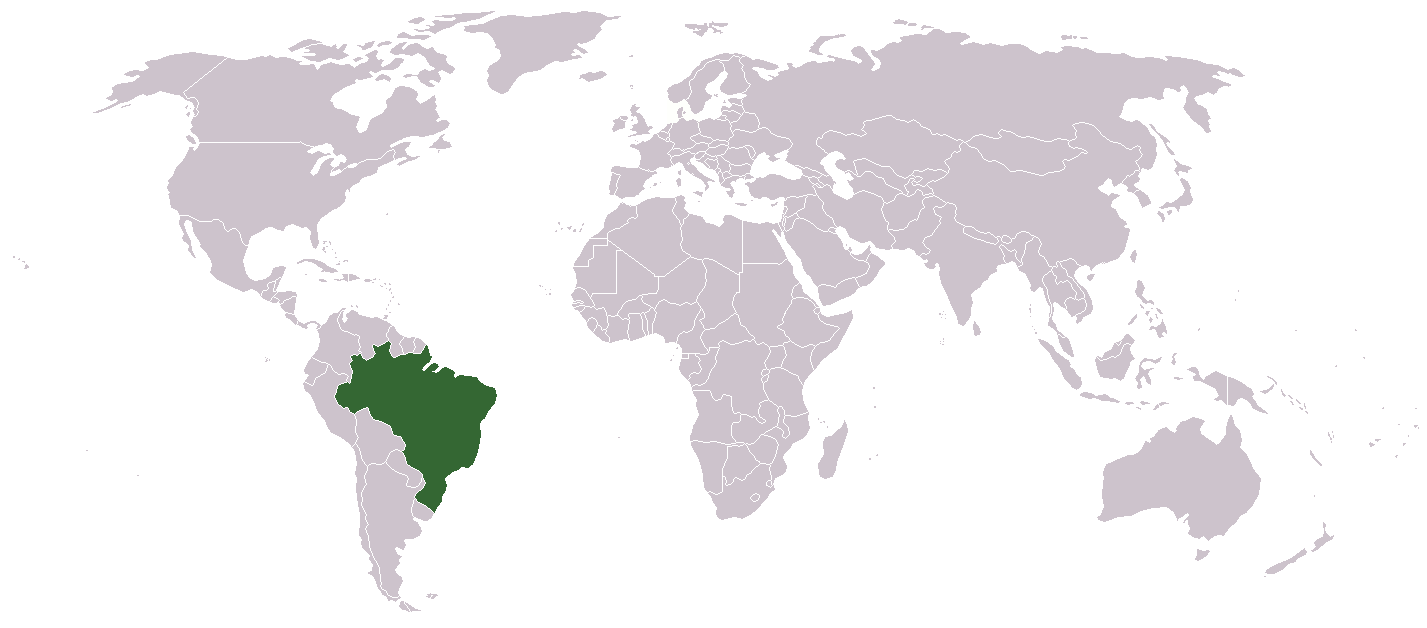
Brazil is located in South America.

The environment of Brazil is characterized by high biodiversity with a population density that decreases away from the coast.

Brazil's large area comprises different ecosystems, which together sustain some of the world's greatest biodiversity. Because of the country's intense economic and demographic growth, Brazil's ability to protect its environmental habitats has increasingly come under threat.

Extensive legal and Illegal logging destroys forests the size of a small country per year, and with it a diverse series of species through habitat destruction and habitat fragmentation. In Brazil forest cover is around 59% of the total land area, equivalent to 496,619,600 hectares (ha) of forest in 2020, down from 588,898,000 hectares (ha) in 1990. In 2020, naturally regenerating forest covered 485,396,000 hectares (ha) and planted forest covered 11,223,600 hectares (ha). Of the naturally regenerating forest 44% was reported to be primary forest (consisting of native tree species with no clearly visible indications of human activity) and around 30% of the forest area was found within protected areas. For the year 2015, 56.% of the forest area was reported to be under public ownership and 44% private ownership.

Between 2002 and 2006, an area of the Amazon rainforest equivalent in size to the State of South Carolina was completely deforested for the purposes of raising cattle and wood-logging. In April 2012 Brazil's powerful farm lobby won a long-sought victory after the National Congress of Brazil approved a controversial forestry bill that environmentalists say will speed deforestation in the Amazon as more land is opened for producing food. By 2020, at least 50% of the species resident in Brazil may become extinct.

There is a general consensus that Brazil has the highest number of both terrestrial vertebrates and invertebrates of any single country in the world. Also, Brazil has the highest primate diversity, the highest number of mammals, the highest number of amphibians, the second highest number of butterflies, the third highest number of birds, and second highest number of reptiles. There is a high number of endangered species, many of them living in threatened habitats such as the Atlantic Forest.

== Waste management ==
In August 2010 the President signed the National Policy on Solid Waste (NPSW) which became the first national law to deal with waste management. However, various states and municipalities already had laws and regulations on the books concerning waste management. The law calls for the Ministry of the Environment to compile a National Plan on Solid Waste with a 20-year horizon to be updated every four years.

== Environmental policy and law ==
Brazil has one of the most complete environmental legislations in the world. However, the laws in this legislation haven't been adequately enforced in the past, compromising their effectiveness towards protecting the natural environment in this nation with a rich biodiversity of fauna and flora.

The Brazilian Environmental Policy (1981) was the first real breakthrough concerning environmental protection and sustainability. Before this, there were polluting emissions guidelines that allowed industries to pollute to a certain extent without being liable to any environmental damage. However, after this policy was passed, strict liability was applied which determined that industries were accountable for all the pollution they were causing. Therefore, from then onwards, polluters would be responsible for all the damage they caused. Just after this policy was implemented, laws were introduced that authorised public prosecutors to act in defence of the environment, and later on, another law was introduced which allowed NGOs to do the same. The Brazilian Ministry of the Environment is the agency in charge of coordinating, supervising and controlling the Brazilian Environmental Policy. It is also responsible for promoting the use of sustainable natural resources and applying sustainable development within the formulation and implementation of national policies.

Environmental licensing is a legal obligation before any potentially damaging and polluting activities take place in any part of Brazil's territory. A framework has been created by the federal government called the National Environment System (SISNAMA), which includes local state government environment agencies, the National Environmental Council (CONAMA) and the Brazilian Institute of Environment and Renewable Natural Resources (IBAMA), in order to facilitate the licensing process.

IBAMA is the Brazilian government's main tool for providing information with regards to environmental welfare and protection, and acts as the “environmental police”. Despite its administrative and financial autonomy, it is responsible for implementing new policies and standards for environmental quality, evaluating environmental impacts, examining environmental degradation and for distributing environmental licenses. IBAMA has the power to impose administrative fines, but when more serious environmental crimes are committed, it is responsible for informing federal authorities for further prosecution.

The challenge Brazil is currently facing is to find a solution as to how powerful actors can be encouraged to abide by environmental regulation and enforce these policies. In order to address this, former president Luiz Inácio Lula da Silva signed a decree on July 22, 2008, that would improve the process of imposing fines and sanctions on people and institutions committing environmental crimes.

Monitoring the occurrence of environmental crimes and policing areas in a country with vast expanses of forests, including the Amazon rainforest and the Atlantic Forest has proved to be a difficult task. IBAMA and the Brazilian Armed Forces are the main organisations used by the federal government to actively protect Brazil's natural ecosystems. The main tactics used to deter environmental degradation and to improve sustainability is to use direct force, such as fines and jail terms. This reflects the command-and-control system in which regulation and environmental protection is carried out in Brazil.

== See also ==
- Deforestation in Brazil
- Environmental governance in Brazil
- List of ecoregions in Brazil
- List of environmental issues
- Protected areas of Brazil
- Biomes in Brazil
- Environmentalism in Rio Grande do Sul
