= Deforestation in Brazil =

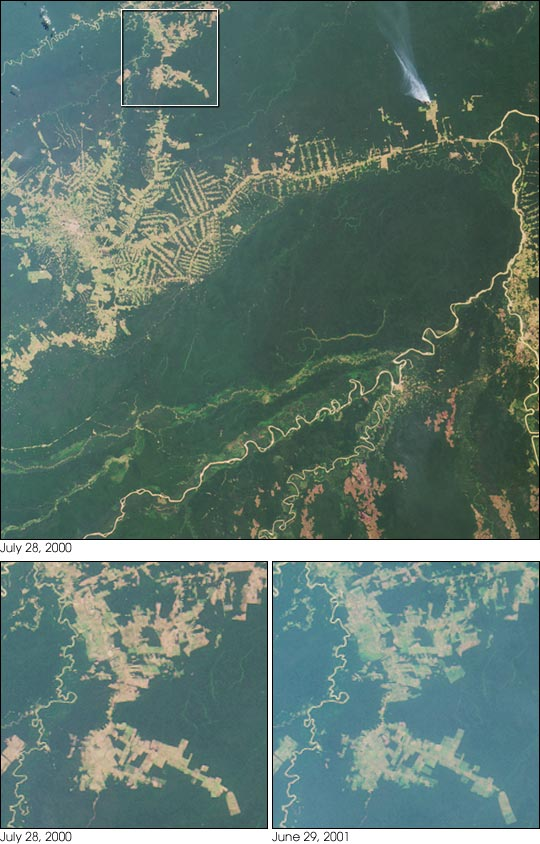
- A NASA satellite observation of deforestation near Rio Branco in Brazil, July 2000
- Country: Brazil
- Location: Amazon basin
- Forest type: Rainforest
- Forest area: 2,100,000 sq mi (5,400,000 km^{2})
- Main causes: Cattle ranching, logging, climate change, mining, infrastructure development

Brazil once had the highest deforestation rate in the world, and recent data still shows high rates of deforestation. Between 2001 and 2023, Brazil lost 68.9 Mha of tree cover (13% of its total tree cover lost since 2000), and in 2022, Brazilian forest loss accounted for 43% of global deforestation. In 2005, Brazil still had the largest area of forest removed annually. Since 1970, over 700,000 square kilometres (270,000 sq mi) of the Amazon rainforest have been destroyed. In 2001, the Amazon was approximately 5,400,000 square kilometres (2,100,000 sq mi), which is only 87% of the Amazon's original size. According to official data, about 729,000 km² have already been deforested in the Amazon biome, which corresponds to 17% of the total. 300,000 km² have been deforested in the last 20 years.

Rainforests have decreased in size primarily due to deforestation. Between May 2000 and August 2006, Brazil lost nearly 150,000 square kilometres (58,000 sq mi) of forest, an area larger than Greece. According to the Living Planet Report 2010, deforestation continues at an alarming rate. At the Convention on Biological Diversity's 9th Conference, 67 ministers signed up to help achieve zero net deforestation by 2020. Due to deforestation the Amazon was a net emitter of greenhouse gas in the 2010s.

The effects include "severe financial losses, social setbacks, and biodiversity loss". Economic losses due to deforestation in Brazil could reach around 317 billion dollars per year, approximately 7 times higher in comparison to the cost of all commodities produced through deforestation. In 2023 the World Bank, published a report named: "A Balancing Act for Brazil's Amazonian States: An Economic Memorandum" proposing non-deforestation based economic program in the region of the Amazon rainforest.

== History ==
Home to much of the Amazon rainforest, Brazil's tropical primary (old-growth) forest loss greatly exceeds that of other countries.

Overall, 20% of the Amazon rainforest has been "transformed" (deforested) and another 6% has been "highly degraded", with Brazil having the highest percentage deforested or highly degraded of any Amazonia nation.

The deforestation rate in Brazil surged by 72% during Bolsonaro's time in office, reflecting that Amazon development was his key policy position.

The deforestation of the Atlantic forest, or Mata Atlântica, dates back to Portuguese colonization and the subsequent rapid development of urban centers. Before human-modification, the forest covered around 17% of Brazil's area. Unlike the Amazon, which has only faced extreme deforestation in recent years, the Atlantic Forest has been a long-lasting target for land development, speculation, and agricultural endeavors. Starting during the sixteenth century, the forest began facing pressure due to the unsustainable development of coffee, sugarcane, brazilwood, and cattle in the region.

In the 1940s Brazil began a program of national development in the Amazon Basin. President Getúlio Vargas declared emphatically that:

The Amazon, in the impact of our will and labor, will cease to be a simple chapter in the world, and made equivalent to other great rivers, shall become a chapter in the history of human civilization. Everything which has up to now been done in Amazonas, whether in agriculture or extractive industry... must be transformed into rational exploitation.

— Getúlio Vargas

Before the 1960s, much of the forest remained intact due to restrictions on access to the Amazon beyond partial clearing along the river banks. The poor soil made plantation-based agriculture unprofitable. The key point in deforestation of the Amazon came when colonists established farms in the forest in the 1960s. They farmed based on crop cultivation and used the slash and burn method. The colonists were unable to successfully manage their fields and the crops due to weed invasion and loss of soil fertility. Soils in the Amazon are productive for only a very short period of time after the land is cleared, so farmers there must constantly move and clear more and more land.

Amazonian colonization was dominated by cattle raising, not only because grass did grow in the poor soil, but also because ranching required little labor, generated decent profit, and awarded social status. However, farming led to extensive deforestation and environmental damage.

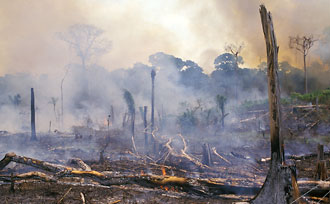
Slash and burn forest removal in Brazil increased dramatically in the 1970s and 1980s.

An estimated 30% of deforestation is due to small farmers; the rate of deforestation in areas they inhabit is greater than in areas occupied by medium and large ranchers, who own 89% of the Legal Amazon's private land. This underlines the importance of using previously cleared land for agriculture, rather than the usual, politically easier path of distributing still-forested areas. The number of small farmers versus large landholders fluctuates with economic and demographic pressures.

== Causes ==
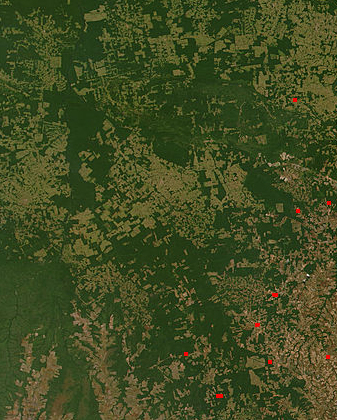
NASA FIRMS satellite observation of deforestation in the Mato Grosso state of Brazil. The transformation from forest to farm is evident by the paler square shaped areas under development.

Deforestation in Brazil has been linked with an extractive economic growth model that relies on factor accumulation (labor, capital, land) rather than total factor productivity, where Brazil's frontier expansion in the "arc of deforestation" is a manifestation of land accumulation. Under this model, with a strong focus on commodities exports, deforestation is an economic choice, often linked to cattle ranching, mining, soybean production or logging, and influenced by factors raising the external competitiveness of Amazonian farmers, ranging from infrastructure development (especially roads) to a depreciating real exchange rate. Land grabbing in the Amazon is associated with the rational expectation that this growth model will continue to raise rural land prices, creating incentives to grab public lands.

=== Cattle ranching and infrastructure ===
Livestock and agriculture have never been very strong in the Amazon: the area has a bad soil and climate for planting, and cattle, although they reach the margins of the forest, are actually spread throughout the country, being the areas that have less cattle throughout Brazil, coastal regions and the Amazon. States like Goiás, Mato Grosso do Sul and Minas Gerais have a lot of cattle. The annual rate of deforestation in the Amazon region continued to increase from 1990 to 2003 because of factors at local, national, and international levels. Seventy per cent of formerly forested land in the Amazon, and 91% of land deforested since 1970, is used for livestock pasture. The Brazilian government initially attributed 38% of all forest loss between 1966 and 1975 to large-scale cattle ranching. According to the Center for International Forestry Research (CIFOR), "between 1990 and 2001 the percentage of Europe's processed meat imports that came from Brazil rose from 40 to 74 percent" and by 2003 "for the first time ever, the growth in Brazilian cattle production, 80 percent of which was in the Amazon[,] was largely export driven."

Forest removal to make way for cattle ranching was the leading cause of deforestation in the Brazilian Amazon from the mid-1960s on. In addition to Vargas's earlier goal of commercial development, the devaluation of the Brazilian real against the dollar had the result of doubling the price of beef in reals; this gave ranchers a widespread incentive to increase the size of their cattle ranches and areas under pasture for mass beef production, resulting in large areas of forest removal.

Removal of forest cover for cattle farming in Brazil was also seen by developers as an economic investment during periods of high inflation, when appreciation of cattle prices provided a way to outpace the interest earned on money left in the bank. Brazilian beef was more competitive on the world market at a time when extensive improvements in the road network in the Amazonas (such as the introduction of the Trans-Amazonian Highway in the early 1970s) gave potential developers access to vast areas of previously inaccessible forest. This coincided with lower transportation costs due to cheaper fuels such as ethanol, which lowered the costs of shipping the beef and further incentivized the development of remote forested areas.

Cattle ranching is not an environmentally friendly investment because cattle emit large amounts of methane. These emissions play a major role in climate change because methane's ability to trap heat is 20 times greater than that of carbon dioxide in a time horizon of 100 years and exponentially higher in shorter time horizons. One cow can emit up to 130 gallons of methane a day, just by belching.

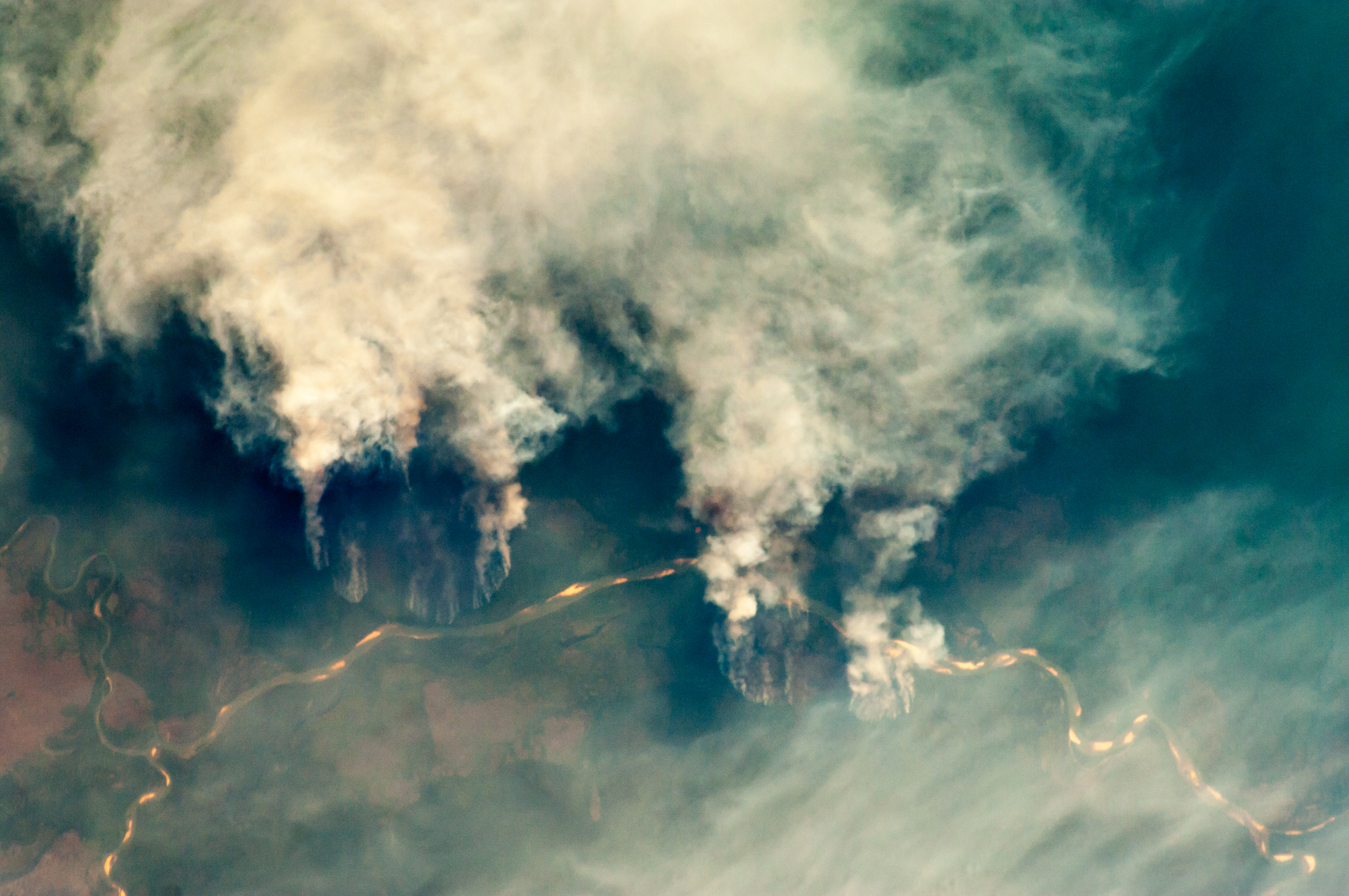
Slash-and-burn forest clearing along the Rio Xingu (Xingu River) in the state of Mato Grosso

The Brazilian government granted land to approximately 150,000 families in the Amazon between 1995 and 1998. Poor farmers were also encouraged by the government through programmes such as the National Institute for Colonization and Agrarian Reform in Brazil (INCRA) to farm unclaimed forest land and after a five-year period were given a title and the right to sell the land. The productivity of the soil following forest removal for farming lasts only a year or two before the fields become infertile and farmers must clear new areas of forest to maintain their income. In 1995, nearly half (48%) of the deforestation in Brazil was attributed to poorer farmers clearing lots under 125 acres (0.51 km^{2}) in size.

=== Mining ===
Mining has also increased deforestation in the Brazilian Amazon, particularly since the 1980s, with miners often clearing forest to open the mines or to provide building material, collecting wood for fuel and subsistence agriculture. In February 2017, the Brazilian government provided a reservation with a surface of 46,000 square miles (120,000 km^{2}) for deforestation, to attract foreign mining investors. In September 2017, the government withdrew this permission.

=== Soybean production ===
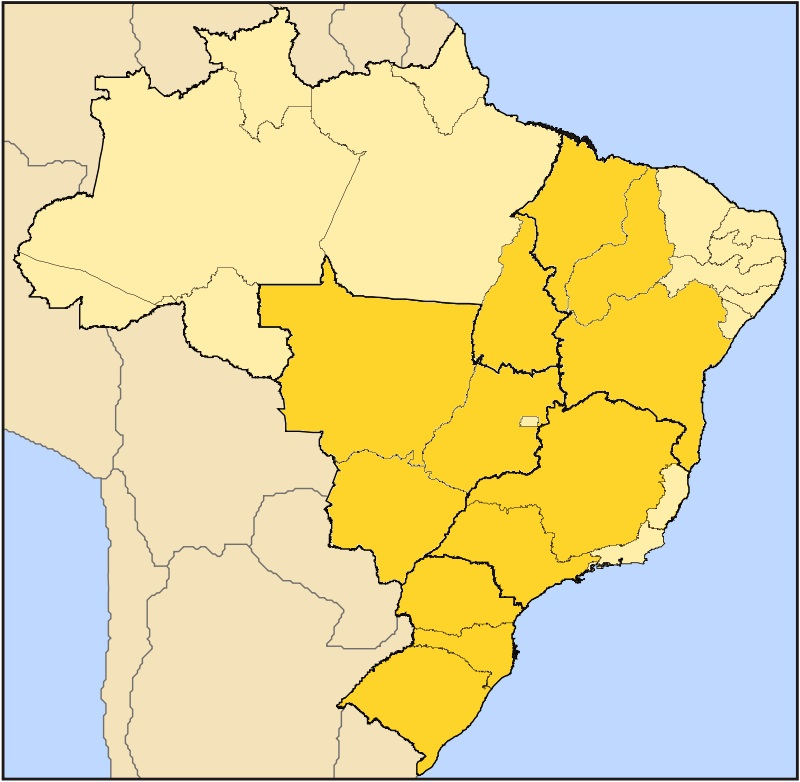
Soy production in Brazil is practiced outside the Amazon

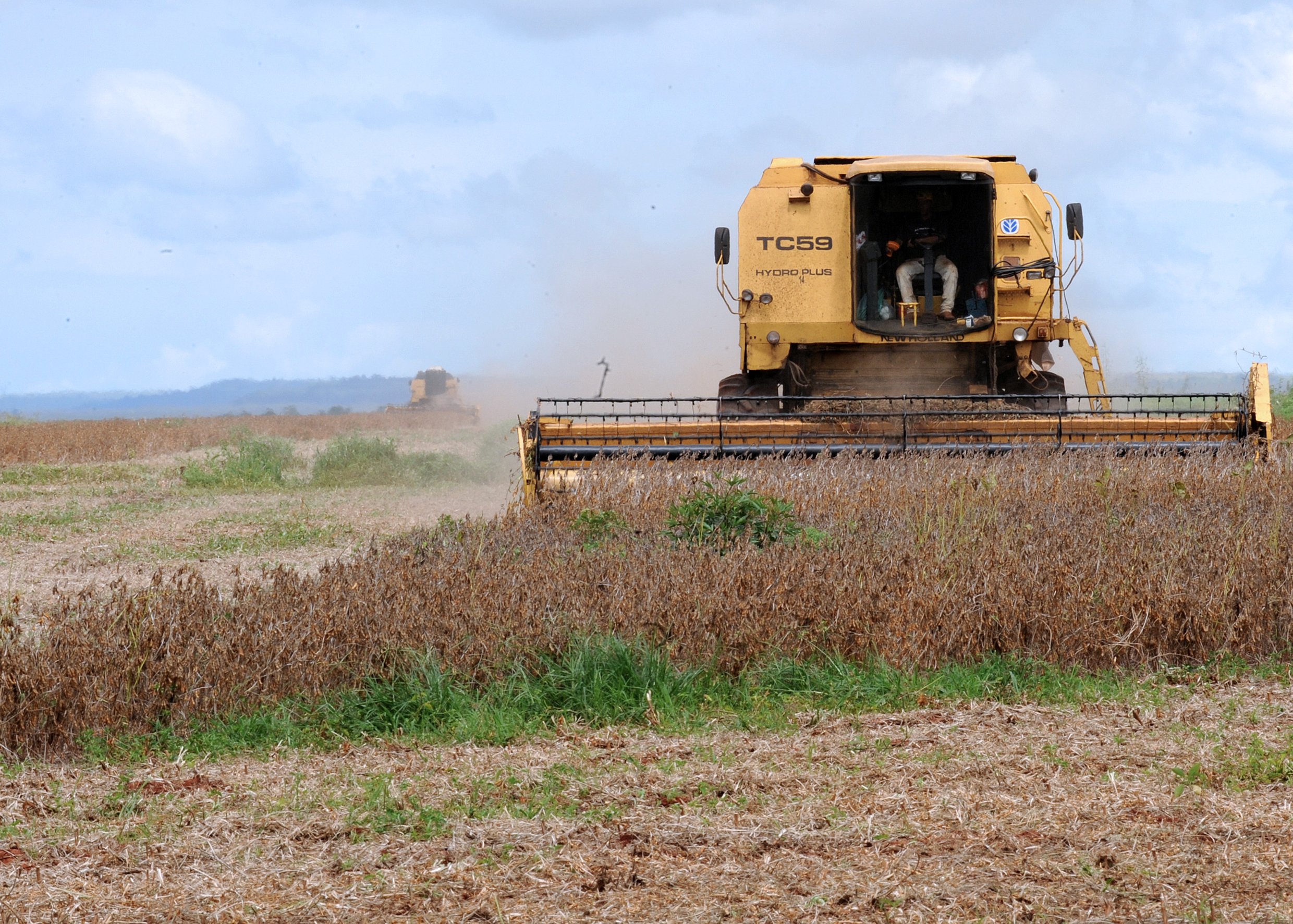
Soybean cultivation in Mato Grosso, Brazil

Brazil is currently the second-largest global producer of soybeans after the United States, mostly for livestock feed. As stated in the Constitution of Brazil, clearing land for crops or fields is considered an "effective use" of land and is the first step toward land ownership. Cleared property is also valued 5–10 times more than forested land, and for that reason is valuable to the owner whose ultimate objective is resale. The soy industry is an important exporter for Brazil; therefore, the needs of soy farmers have been used to validate many of the controversial transportation projects being developed in the Amazon.

However, the Amazonian soil is of very low quality for plantations: it has few nutrients and the soil is sterile after two or three years of planting. In 2020, only 5% of the country's agricultural production came from the Northern Region. Most of the soy plantation in the country is practiced in the region of Cerrado, a savanna with little vegetation that was barren and where agriculture was impractical until a few years ago. Thanks to EMBRAPA, Brazil adapted plants for cultivation in this region, since Brazil has many terrible biomes for the practice of agriculture and livestock, such as the Semi-Arid Region of the Northeast, the Amazon Forest itself or the mountainous plateaus in the Southeast.

Cargill, a multinational company which controls the majority of the soya bean trade in Brazil, has been criticized, along with fast food chains like McDonald's, by Greenpeace for accelerating the deforestation of the Amazon. Cargill is the main supplier of soya beans to large fast food companies such as McDonald's which use the soy products to feed their cattle and chickens. As fast-food chains expand, the chains must increase the quantity of their livestock in order to produce more products. In order to meet the resulting demand for soya, Cargill has expanded its soy production by clear-cutting parts of the Amazon.

A report by Greenpeace mentions that European supermarket giant Tesco told Greenpeace that 99% of its soya footprint is made up of animal feed. This is responsible for more than 500,000 tonnes of soya imports into the UK each year, making up more than a sixth of the total.

The same report by Greenpeace also mentions that animal feed for meat production is Europe's largest contribution to deforestation, with soya imports representing 47% of Europe's deforestation footprint, compared to 14% for pasture expansion for livestock and 10% for palm oil. Greenpeace called for "a new EU law to protect forests by keeping any product that comes from forest destruction off the European market."

In 2020, the Amsterdam Declarations Partnership (which includes Germany, France, Denmark, Italy, Norway, the UK and the Netherlands) sent an open letter to vice president Hamilton Mourão, stating that Brazil's backwards moves in environmental protection were threatening Europe's desire to source its food sustainably.

The first two highways, the Rodovia Belém-Brasília (1958) and the Cuiabá-Porto Velho (1968), were the only federal highways in the Legal Amazon to be paved and passable year-round before the late 1990s. These two highways are said to be "at the heart of the 'arc of deforestation'" that is the epicenter of deforestation in the Brazilian Amazon. The Belém-Brasília Highway attracted nearly two million settlers in its first twenty years. The success of the Belém-Brasília highway in opening up the forest was re-enacted as paved roads continued to be developed, unleashing the irrepressible spread of settlement. The completion of the roads were followed by a wave of resettlement and the settlers had a significant effect on the forest.

Scientists using NASA satellite data have found that clearing for mechanized cropland has recently become a significant force in Brazilian Amazon deforestation. This change in land use may alter the region's climate and the land's ability to absorb carbon dioxide. Researchers found that in 2003, the peak year of deforestation, more than 20 percent of the Mato Grosso state's forests were converted to cropland. This finding suggests that the recent cropland expansion in the region is contributing to further deforestation. In 2005, soybean prices fell by more than 25 percent and some areas of Mato Grosso showed a decrease in large deforestation events, although the central agricultural zone continued to clear forests. But, deforestation rates could return to the high levels seen in 2003 as soybean and other crop prices begin to rebound in international markets. Brazil has become a leading worldwide producer of grains including soybean, which accounts for 5% of the nation's exports. This new driver of forest loss suggests that the rise and fall of prices for other crops, beef and timber may also have a significant impact on future land use in the region, according to the study.

=== Logging ===
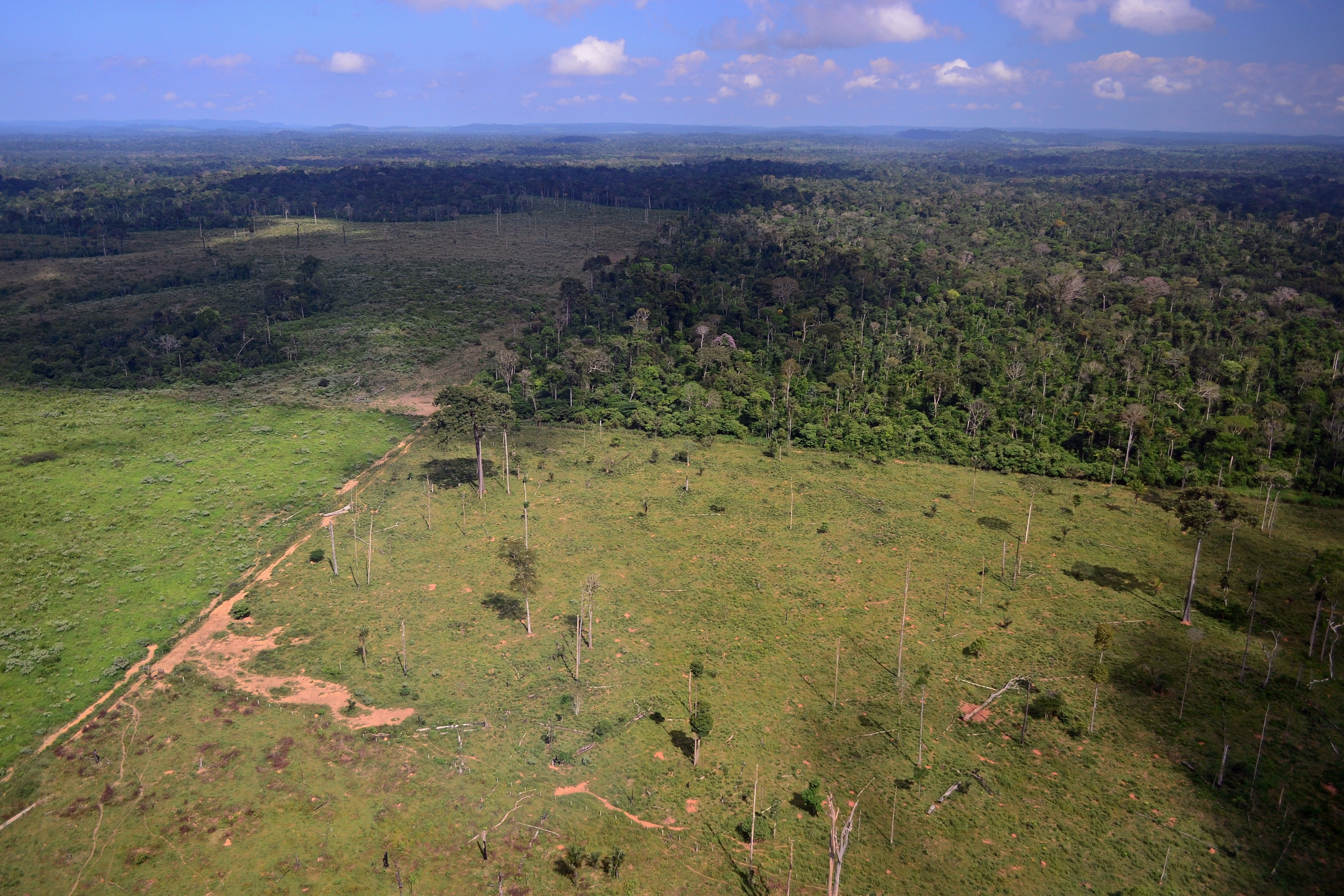
Deforestation in the state of Pará

The export of tree trunks native to the Amazon (selling fresh wood, that is, without any type of processing), is an illegal activity in Brazil. However, it is common to see, in Europe, the sale of furniture produced with illegal Brazilian woods, such as jacaranda and mahogany. Timber arrives illegally in Europe and the countries of the continent do not take action to block these imports. Logging in Brazil's Amazon is economically motivated. The economic opportunity for developing regions is driven by timber export and demand for charcoal. Charcoal-producing ovens use large amounts of timber. In one month, the Brazilian government destroyed 800 illegal ovens in Tailândia. These 800 ovens were estimated to consume about 23,000 trees per month. Logging for timber export is selective, since only a few species, such as mahogany, have commercial value and are harvested. Selective logging still does a lot of damage to the forest. For every tree harvested, 5-10 other trees are logged, to transport the logs through the forest. Also, a falling tree takes down a lot of other small trees. A logged forest contains significantly fewer species than areas where selective logging has not taken place. A forest disturbed by selective logging is also significantly more vulnerable to fire.

Logging in the Amazon, in theory, is controlled and only strictly licensed individuals are allowed to harvest the trees in selected areas. In practice, illegal logging is widespread in Brazil. Up to 60 to 80 percent of all logging in Brazil is estimated to be illegal, with 70% of the timber cut wasted in the mills. Most illegal logging companies are international companies that don't replant the trees and the practice is extensive. Expensive wood such as mahogany is illegally exported to profit these companies. Fewer trees mean that less photosynthesis will occur and therefore oxygen levels drop. Carbon dioxide emissions increase, as this gas is released from a tree when it's cut down and burned or left to rot. A tree can absorb as much as 48 pounds of carbon per year so illegal logging has a major impact on climate change.

To combat this destruction, the Brazilian government has stopped issuing new permits for logging. Unauthorized harvesting has continued nonetheless. Efforts to prevent cutting down forests include payments to landowners. Instead of banning logging altogether, the government hopes payments of comparable sums will dissuade owners from further deforestation.

=== Weak non-commodities sectors ===
Brazil's legacy of import substitution industrialization is reflected in an imbalance where export-oriented commodities sectors are much stronger than more domestically oriented and protected manufacturing and services: between 1996 and 2022 labor productivity in agriculture grew by 5.8% in agriculture and 2.9% in mining, while it fell by 0.8% in manufacturing, with mixed experience in services. Yet on the agricultural frontier in the Amazon the Jevons paradox implies that agricultural productivity growth accelerates deforestation. Stronger productivity gains in manufacturing and services, the more urban sectors which are critical for an urbanized population like Brazil's, would take pressure off the agricultural frontier in the Amazon.

The COVID-19 pandemic has increased deforestation in Brazil. The government has been preoccupied by the global pandemic, and unchecked illegal activity has taken place. "The trend line is shooting upward compared to a year that was already historic in terms of a rise in deforestation," said federal prosecutor Ana Carolina Haliuc Bragança."If state entities don't adopt very decisive measures, we're looking at a likely tragedy."

=== Climate change ===
Climate change played a significant role in the wildfires in the Pantanal.

== Effects ==
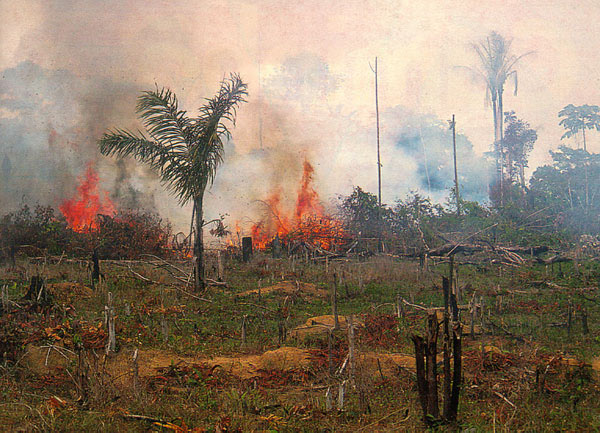
A burning forest in Brazil

Deforestation and loss of biodiversity have led to high risks of irreversible changes to the Amazon's tropical forests. It has been suggested by modeling studies that the deforestation may be approaching a "tipping point", after which large-scale "savannization" or desertification of the Amazon will take place, with catastrophic consequences for the world's climate, due to a self-perpetuating collapse of the region's biodiversity and ecosystems. In 2018, about 17% of the Amazon rainforest was already destroyed. Research suggests that upon reaching about 20–25%, the tipping point to flip it into a non-forest ecosystems (in eastern, southern and central Amazonia) could be reached.

The result of passing the tipping point will be catastrophic for both and will hurt global food security. Carlos Nobres, a climate scientist, said: "Brazil should be battling the most [to protect the Amazon], because it has the most to lose,". Experts note that avoiding deforestation and climate change is a top interest of the agricultural sector. This is something that's only been expedited by the current president of Brazil, Jair Bolsonaro, with major staff and budgeting cuts in relation to environmental enforcement.

=== Climate change ===
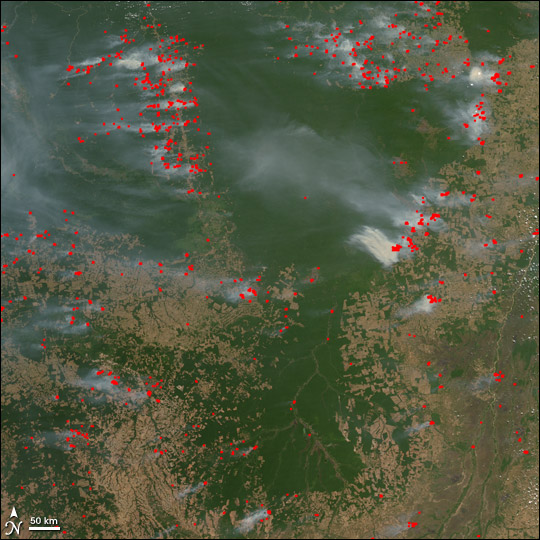
A NASA satellite observation of forest fires resulting from deforestation near the Xingu basin in August 2007. The red dots represent areas of fire.

Between July and October 1987, about 19,300 square miles (50,000 km^{2}) of rainforest was burned in the states of Pará, Mato Grosso, Rondônia, and Acre releasing more than 500 million tons of carbon, 44 million tons of carbon monoxide, and millions of tons of nitrogen oxides and other poisonous chemicals into the atmosphere.

Carbon present in the trees is essential for ecosystem development and plays a key role in the regional and global climate. Fallen leaves from deforestation leave behind a mass of dead plant material known as slash, which on decomposition provides a food source for invertebrates. This has the indirect effect of increasing atmospheric carbon dioxide levels through respiration and microbial activity. Simultaneously the organic carbon in the soil structure becomes depleted; the presence of carbon plays a vital role in the functioning of life in any ecosystem.

=== Biodiversity ===
Rainforests are the oldest ecosystems on earth. Rainforest plants and animals continue to evolve, developing into the most diverse and complex ecosystems on earth. Living in limited areas, most of these species are endemic, found nowhere else in the world. In tropical rainforests, an estimated 90% of the species of the ecosystem live in the canopy. Since tropical rainforests are estimated to hold 50% of the planet's species, the canopy of rainforests worldwide may hold 45% of life on Earth. The Amazon rainforest borders eight countries, and has the world's largest river basin and is the source of 1/5 of the Earth's river water. It has the world's greatest diversity of birds and freshwater fish. The Amazon is home to more species of plants and animals than any other terrestrial ecosystem on the planet—perhaps 30% of the world's species are found there.

More than 300 species of mammals are found in the Amazon, the majority of them bats and rodents. The Amazon basin contains more freshwater fish species than anywhere else in the world—more than 3,000 species. More than 1,500 bird species are also found there. Frogs are overwhelmingly the most abundant amphibians in the rainforest. Species interdependence takes many forms in the forest, from species relying on other species for pollination and seed dispersal to predator-prey relationships and symbiotic relationships. Each species that disappears from the ecosystem may weaken the survival chances of another, while the loss of a keystone species—an organism that links many other species together—could cause a significant disruption in the functioning of the entire system.

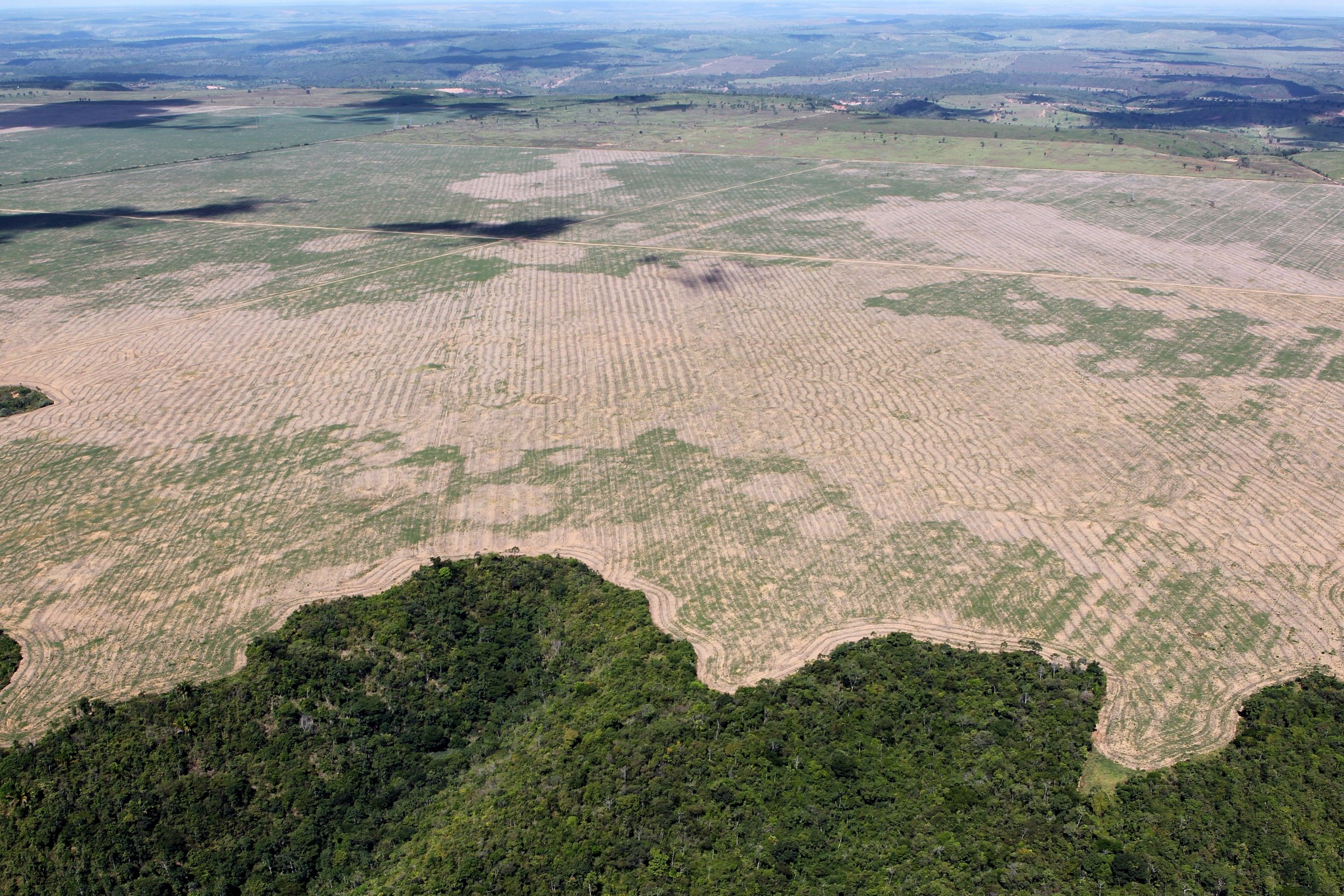
Deforestation in the state of Maranhão

=== Indigenous people ===
A WRI report mentions that "tenure-secure" indigenous lands generates billions and sometimes trillions of dollars' worth of benefits in the form of carbon sequestration, reduced pollution, clean water and more. It says that tenure-secure indigenous lands have low deforestation rates, they help to reduce GHG emissions, control erosion and flooding by anchoring soil, and provide a suite of other local, regional and global "ecosystem services." However, many of these communities find themselves on the front lines of the deforestation crisis, and their lives and livelihoods threatened.

On March 30, 2020, land defender Zezico Guajajara's body was found near his village. Zezico was a member of the protected Guajajara Tribe in the Amazon who started the Guardians of the Forest in 2012.

The Yanomami people, one of the largest Indigenous groups in Brazil, have seen their lands increasingly threatened by illegal deforestation and mining activities. Satellite data shows over 2,000 hectares of their land have been deforested for illegal gold mining between 2019 and 2022.

=== Land degradation ===
Deforestation for the export of timber removes valuable protection for the soils in a dynamic ecosystem; thus regions are prone to desertification and silting of river banks as rivers become clogged with eroded soils in sparse areas. If too much timber is cut, soil that once had sufficient cover can get baked and dry out in the sun, leading to erosion and degradation of soil fertility; this means farmers cannot profit from their land even after clearing it. According to the United Nations Environmental Programme (UNEP) in 1977, deforestation is a major cause of desertification and in 1980 threatened 35% of the world's land surface and 20% of the world's population.

From 2003-2019, carbon losses due to soil erosion from land degradation have increased in the Brazilian Amazon. In this time frame, carbon loss totaled 3,042 MtC. Degradation has accounted for 44% of carbon losses with 56% coming from deforestation. Activities like logging, fire, mining and oil extraction have led to increased numbers in the area. These combined effects have hindered forests' ability to absorb carbon. For Brazil, it is important to reduce standing pressure on standing forests, which is where tree species and plants compete for light, air, water and nutrients. They need to create financial mechanisms to help landowners incentivize conservation of forests on private lands. A mechanism could be established under Brazil's Forest Code with the environmental reserve quotas. The Brazilian Forest Code requires landowners in the Amazon to maintain 35 to 80 percent of their property under native vegetation.

=== Pollution ===
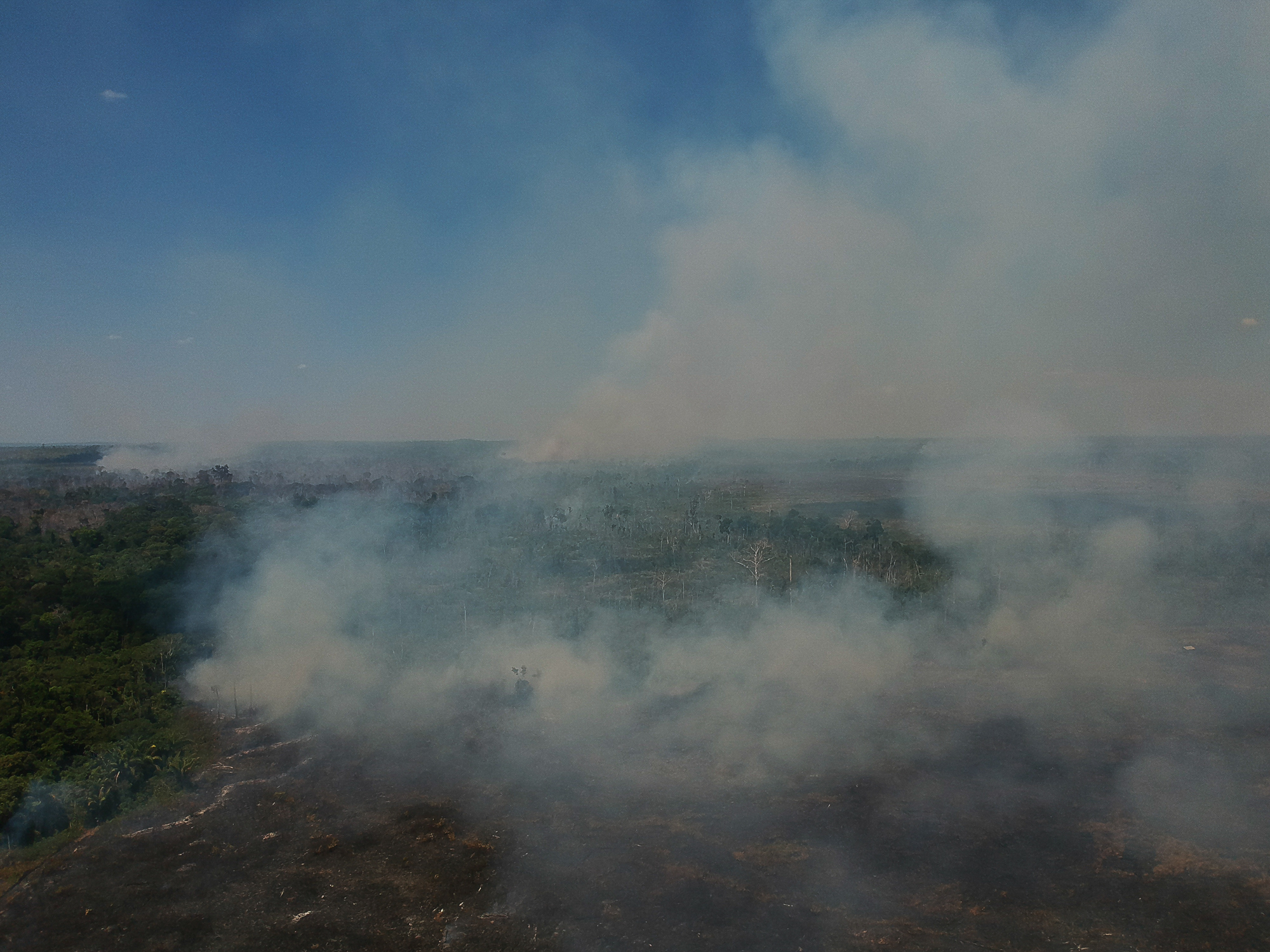
2020 Brazil rainforest wildfires

Exploitation of forests for mining activities such as gold mining has also significantly increased the risk of mercury poisoning and contamination of the ecosystem and water. Mercury poisoning can affect the food chain and affect wildlife both on land and in the rivers. It can also affect plants and the crops of farmers trying to farm forest areas. Pollution may result from mine sludge and affect the functioning of the river system when exposed soil is blown in the wind and can have a significant impact on aquatic populations further affected by dam building in the region. Dams may have a profound impact on migrating fish and ecological life and leave plains prone to flooding and leaching.

In August 2019, smoke from wildfires in Brazil's rainforests became so thick that it arrived in São Paulo and plunged the city into darkness in the middle of the day for an hour, prompting the spread of the hashtag "prayforamazonia" on social media.

=== Drought ===
The deforestation of the Amazon has already had a significant negative impact on Brazil's freshwater supply, harming, among others, the agricultural industry that has contributed to the clearing of the forests. In 2005, parts of the Amazon basin experienced the worst drought in more than a century. This has been the result of two factors:

1. The rainforest provides much of the rainfall in Brazil, even in areas far from it. Deforestation increased the impacts of the droughts of 2005, 2010, and 2015–2016.
2. The rainforest, by inducing rainfall and helping with water storage, provides freshwater to the rivers that give water to Brazil and other countries.

Even modest increases in Amazon forest loss may reduce water supplies in Brazilian cities and in neighboring countries. More massive deforestation could alter water supplies as far away as Africa or California.

As of 2020 deforestation in Brazil is close to reach a tipping point after which the forest will change to savanna. The result of passing such tipping point will be catastrophic for the agriculture and hydroelectricity in Brazil. Already both sectors are severely hurt. For example, the rainy season has been shortened by 15 – 30 days in 40 years, the amount of rainfall decreased, the harvest became lower in many areas, the mega dam Belo Monte can produce less power. In the future, the soya sector can lose 40% of productivity even in areas with low risk, the hydroelectric sector more than 80%. The lack of water can cause water conflict between the different sectors of the economy. Also passing the tipping point will hurt global food security.

Rainforests are home to a wide range of animal and plant species and a high biodiversity. They are also important for absorbing carbon dioxide and returning it to oxygen. The loss of the Amazon rainforests would mean an acceleration of climate change and cause the world's weather patterns to be much more unstable.

Carlos Nobre, a climate scientist says: "Brazil should be battling the most [to protect the Amazon] because it has the most to lose." Experts note that avoiding deforestation and climate change is a top interest of the agricultural sector because it existence depending on it.

A 2022 study found that 28% of the agricultural land in Brazil is no more climatically optimal due to climate change and to change in local climate as a result of deforestation. The number will go to 51% by 2030 and 74% by 2060 if the change in climate will continue in the same way. Brazil has a strong interest in forest conservation as its agriculture sector directly depends on its forests.

=== Temperature ===
In 2019, a group of scientists published research suggesting that in a "business as usual" scenario, the deforestation of the Amazon Rainforest would raise the temperature in Brazil by 1.45 degrees. They wrote: "Increased temperatures in already hot locations may increase human mortality rates and electricity demands, reduce agricultural yields and water resources, and contribute to biodiversity collapse, particularly in tropical regions. Furthermore, local warming may cause shifts in species distributions, including for species involved in infectious disease transmissions." The authors of the paper say that deforestation is already causing a rise in the temperature.

=== Economic effects ===
According to the World Bank, economic losses due to deforestation in Brazil could reach around 317 billion dollars per year, approximately 7 times higher in comparison to the cost of all commodities produced through deforestation.

As of 2024, the Amazon drought continues to be an issue economically for Brazil. With dried up rivers as well as forest fires, the productivity of work in the Amazon has gone down. The Brazilian Legal Amazon (LAM) covers 60% of the national territory, with 23% of it already being deforested. This deforestation is driven by factors including agriculture, soy cultivation, cattle ranching, and logging. These activities are often incentivized by government policies and market demands, leading to increased land clearing by deforestation.

The demand for these products outside of the Amazon has put pressure on the use of natural resources and led to the reshaping of the socio-economic landscapes. The main economic driving force has been from foreign countries and Brazil itself. This export-driven deforestation is responding to the rapid pressure on natural resources.

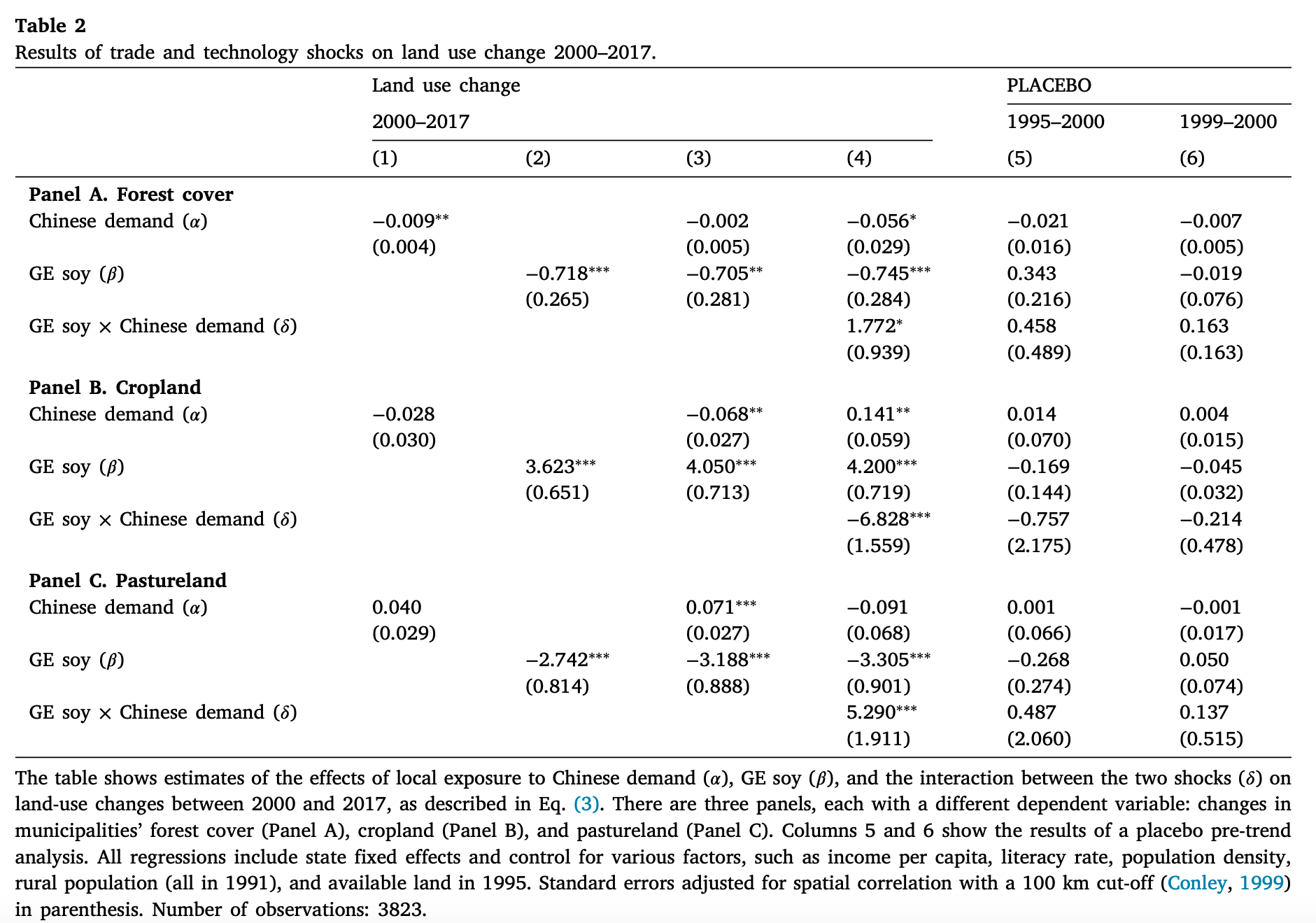
This chart shows the results of trade and technology shocks on land use change from 2000-2017.

The pressure on deforestation in the Amazon has affected the trade and agricultural productivity in Brazil. One of the leading countries in the demand for agricultural products has been China. The interest from China comes from Brazil's port investments and land infrastructure, which will ensure a fast and efficient transport network for China. This increased demand from China involves a two-step process, using remote-sensing data. The first step of the process comes from international trade flow data, which is used to compute the differential growth in Chinese demand for each product (excluding Brazil). The second step takes the Chinese-product-specific demand growth to municipalities in Brazil based on their production composition in 1995. The data used was sourced from MapBiomas in Brazil, which classifies the land use based on 30-meter LANDSAT images. The exposure to trade with China mitigated the deforestation impacts from new soy technology. In table 2 column 4 in the image to the right, there is a change in the coefficients associated with Chinese demand. Regions that were heavily impacted by both trade and technology shocks saw less deforestation and slower cropland expansion compared to areas that were only influenced by genetically engineered (GE) soy. This suggests that the deforestation effects of GE soy are mitigated in areas with greater exposure to technological advancements and increased demand from China.

== NASA survey ==
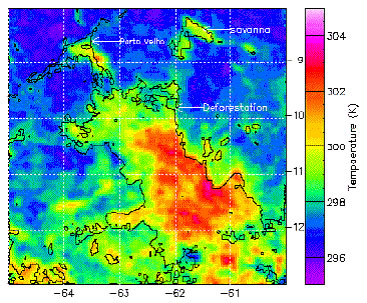
The effect of deforestation on increasing land temperature

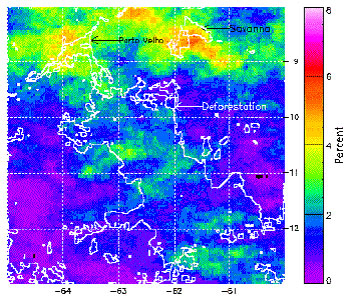
Effect of deforestation on cloud cover

In the American Meteorological Society Journal of Climate, two research meteorologists at NASA's Goddard Space Flight Center, Andrew Negri and Robert Adler, have analysed the impact of deforestation on climatic patterns in the Amazon using data and observatory readings collected from NASA's Tropical Rainfall Measuring Mission over many years. Working with the University of Arizona and the North Carolina State University, Negri said, "In deforested areas, the land heats up faster and reaches a higher temperature, leading to localized upward motions that enhance the formation of clouds and ultimately produce more rainfall".

They also examined cloud cover in deforested areas. In comparison with areas still unaffected by deforestation, they found a significant increase in cloud cover and rainfall during the August–September wet season where the forest had been cleared. The height or existence of plants and trees in the forest directly affects the aerodynamics of the atmosphere, and precipitation in the area. In addition, the Massachusetts Institute of Technology developed a series of detailed computer simulation models of rainfall patterns in the Amazon during the 1990s and concluded that forest removal also leaves soil exposed to the sun, and the increased temperature on the surface enhances evaporation and increases moisture in the air.

== Rates ==
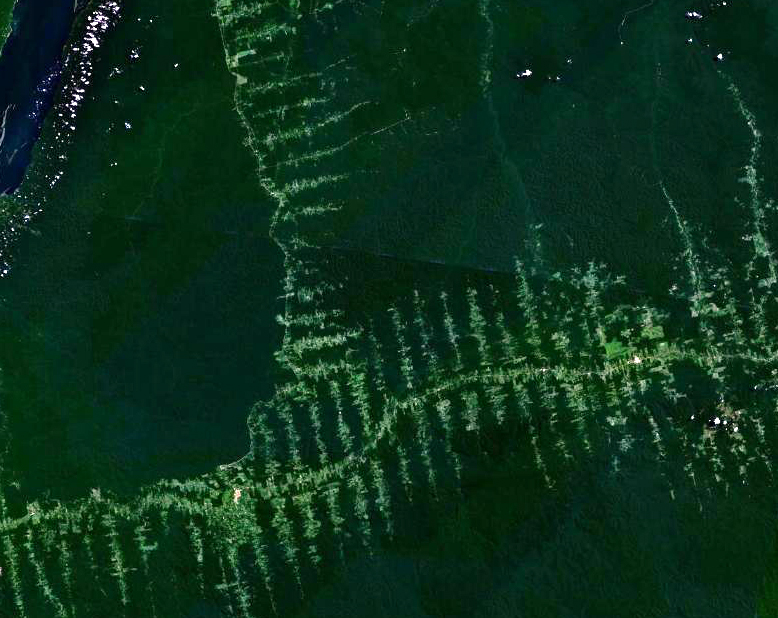
The zig-zag patterns across the road resulting from deforestation in Brazil can be seen from space.

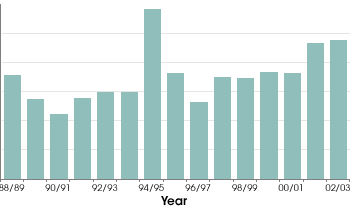
A deforestation chart. The double increase for 1994 and 1995 was attributed to accidental forest burning rather than active logging.

Deforestation rates in the Brazilian Amazon have slowed dramatically since peaking in 2004 at 27,423 square kilometers per year. By 2009, deforestation had fallen to around 7,000 square kilometers per year, a decline of nearly 75 percent from 2004, according to Brazil's National Institute for Space Research (Instituto Nacional de Pesquisas Espaciais, or INPE), which produces deforestation figures annually.

Their deforestation estimates are derived from 100 to 220 images taken during the dry season in the Amazon by the China–Brazil Earth Resources Satellite program (CBS), and may only consider the loss of the Amazon rainforest – not the loss of natural fields or savanna within the Amazon biome. According to INPE, the original Amazon rainforest biome in Brazil of 4,100,000 km^{2} was reduced to 3,403,000 km^{2} by 2005 – representing a loss of 17.1%.

In 2018, Brazil released its worst annual deforestation figures in a decade amid fears that the situation might worsen when the avowedly anti-environmentalist president-elect Jair Bolsonaro took power. Between August 2017 and July 2018, 7,900 km^{2} were deforested, according to preliminary figures from the environment ministry based on satellite monitoring – a 13.7% rise from the previous year and the biggest area of forest cleared since 2008. The area is equivalent to 987,000 football pitches. Deforestation in the Brazilian Amazon rose more than 88% in June 2019 compared with the same month in 2018. In the year 2019 approximately 9,762 square kilometers of the Amazonian forest were destroyed, 30% more than in the previous year. Environmental groups, scientists accused the policy of the government of Bolsonaro that rejected the blames. In January 2020, deforestation more than doubled compared with the previous year. From August 2020 to July 2021, INPE recorded 13,235sq km of deforestation. In January 2022, according to government data, Brazil recorded the most deforestation in the Amazon rainforest for the month of January since the current data series began in 2015/2016.

Estimates of the rates of deforestation in the Amazon rainforest from 1970 to 2022 are given in the table below, based on data from the National Institute for Space Research and the Food and Agriculture Organization (FAO).

Period	Estimated remaining forest cover in the Brazilian Amazon (km^{2})	Annual forest loss (km^{2})	Percent of 1970 cover remaining	Total forest loss since 1970 (km^{2})
Pre–1970	4,100,000	—	—	—
1977	3,955,870	21,130	96.5%	144,130
1978–1987	3,744,570	21,130	91.3%	355,430
1988	3,723,520	21,050	90.8%	376,480
1989	3,705,750	17,770	90.4%	394,250
1990	3,692,020	13,730	90.0%	407,980
1991	3,680,990	11,030	89.8%	419,010
1992	3,667,204	13,786	89.4%	432,796
1993	3,652,308	14,896	89.1%	447,692
1994	3,637,412	14,896	88.7%	462,588
1995	3,608,353	29,059	88.0%	491,647
1996	3,590,192	18,161	87.6%	509,808
1997	3,576,965	13,227	87.2%	523,035
1998	3,559,582	17,383	86.8%	540,418
1999	3,542,323	17,259	86.4%	557,677
2000	3,524,097	18,226	86.0%	575,903
2001	3,505,932	18,165	85.5%	594,068
2002	3,484,281	21,651	85.0%	615,719
2003	3,458,885	25,396	84.4%	641,115
2004	3,431,113	27,772	83.7%	668,887
2005	3,412,099	19,014	83.2%	687,901
2006	3,397,814	14,285	82.9%	702,186
2007	3,386,163	11,651	82.6%	713,837
2008	3,373,252	12,911	82.3%	726,748
2009	3,365,788	7,464	82.1%	734,212
2010	3,358,788	7,000	81.9%	741,212
2011	3,352,370	6,418	81.8%	747,630
2012	3,347,799	4,571	81.7%	752,201
2013	3,341,908	5,891	81.5%	758,092
2014	3,336,896	5,012	81.4%	763,104
2015	3,330,689	6,207	81.2%	769,311
2016	3,322,796	7,893	81.0%	777,204
2017	3,315,849	6,947	80.9%	784,151
2018	3,307,949	7,900	80.7%	792,051
2019	3,297,251	10,698	80.4%	802,749
2020	3,286,903	10,348	80.2%	813,097
2021	3,274,716	12,187	79.9%	825,284
2022	3,263,148	11,568	79.6%	836,852

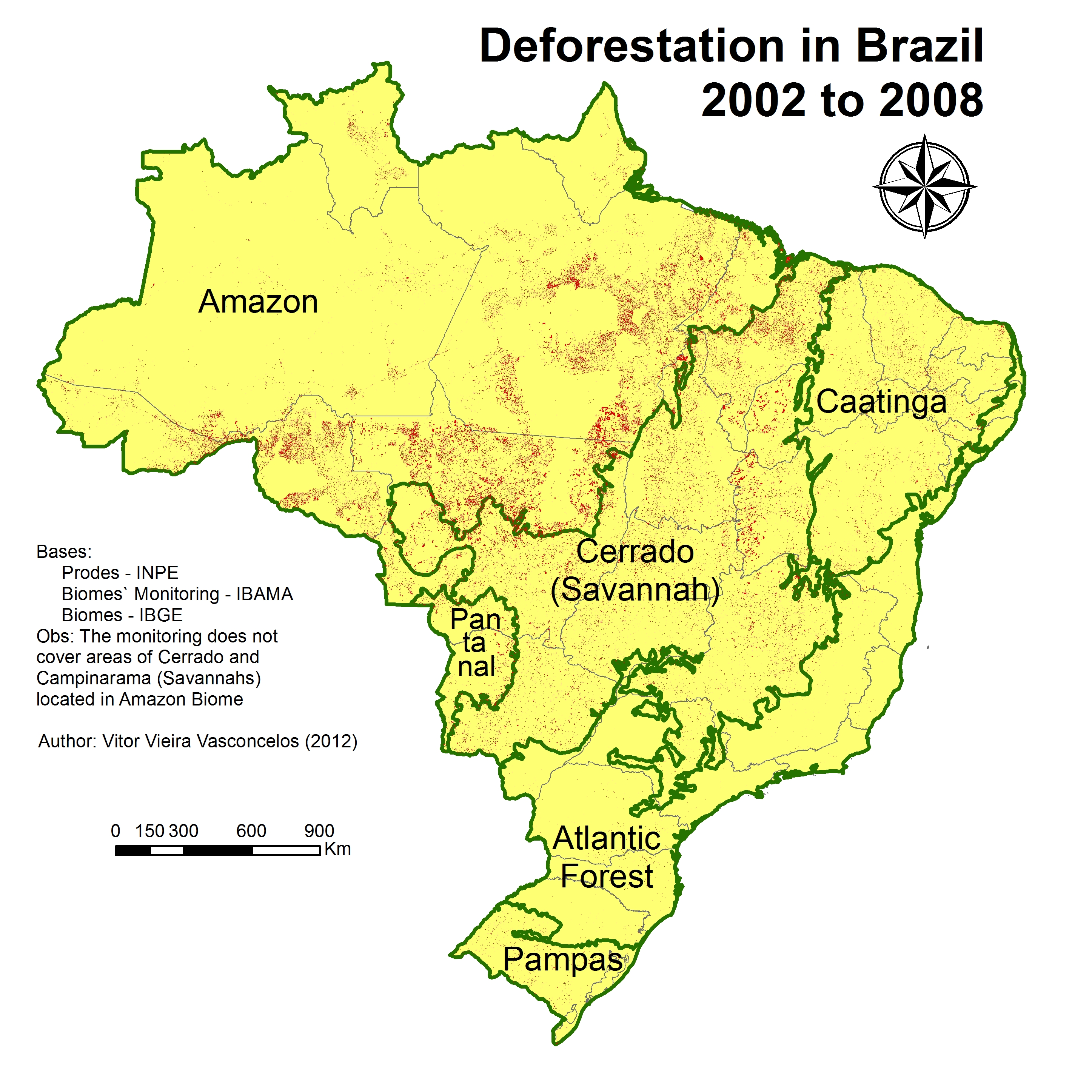
Map of deforestation in Brazil from 2002 to 2008 for each biome. Bases: PRODES (INPE) and Biome Monitoring (IBAMA). Note: The monitoring does not cover areas of Cerrado and Campinarama (savannahs) located in the Amazon biome.

== Tree cover extent and loss ==
Global Forest Watch publishes annual estimates of tree cover loss and 2000 tree cover extent derived from time-series analysis of Landsat satellite imagery in the Global Forest Change dataset. In this framework, tree cover refers to vegetation taller than 5 m (including natural forests and tree plantations), and tree cover loss is defined as the complete removal of tree cover canopy for a given year, regardless of cause.

For Brazil, country statistics report cumulative tree cover loss of 73,317,081 ha (733,170.81 km^{2}) from 2001 to 2024 (about 14.1% of its 2000 tree cover area). For tree cover density greater than 30%, country statistics report a 2000 tree cover extent of 519,056,656 ha (5,190,566.56 km^{2}). The charts and table below display this data. In simple terms, the annual loss number is the area where tree cover disappeared in that year, and the extent number shows what remains of the 2000 tree cover baseline after subtracting cumulative loss. Forest regrowth is not included in the dataset.

Annual tree cover loss in Brazil, 2001–2024. View chart definition.
Tree cover extent in 2000 minus cumulative tree cover loss in Brazil, 2001–2024 (loss-only residual; does not account for gain). View chart definition.

Annual tree cover extent and loss
Year	Tree cover extent (km2) (Note: This residual measure does not include forest regrowth.)	Annual tree cover loss (km2)
2001	5,163,103.72	27,462.84
2002	5,128,034.99	35,068.73
2003	5,095,551.08	32,483.91
2004	5,057,066.15	38,484.93
2005	5,022,204.03	34,862.12
2006	4,993,437.29	28,766.74
2007	4,967,220.30	26,216.99
2008	4,942,779.38	24,440.92
2009	4,924,602.22	18,177.16
2010	4,897,714.95	26,887.27
2011	4,878,483.34	19,231.61
2012	4,849,297.74	29,185.60
2013	4,829,842.96	19,454.78
2014	4,802,913.84	26,929.12
2015	4,780,687.29	22,226.55
2016	4,726,901.18	53,786.11
2017	4,681,705.71	45,195.47
2018	4,652,221.78	29,483.93
2019	4,625,256.36	26,965.42
2020	4,592,349.91	32,906.45
2021	4,562,449.61	29,900.30
2022	4,529,366.26	33,083.35
2023	4,501,312.70	28,053.56
2024	4,457,395.75	43,916.95

== REDD+ forest reference levels and monitoring ==
Brazil has submitted forest reference emission levels (FRELs) and a forest reference level (FRL) under the UNFCCC REDD+ framework, and each submission has been subject to a UNFCCC technical assessment in the context of results-based payments. On the UNFCCC REDD+ Web Platform, Brazil's submissions are listed as having assessed reference levels and (for most submissions) reported elements of the Warsaw Framework on REDD+, including a national strategy, safeguards information summaries, and a national forest monitoring system.

Brazil's first assessed subnational FREL for the Amazon biome used a dynamic mean of carbon dioxide emissions from "gross deforestation" monitored by the National Institute for Space Research (INPE) via the PRODES satellite system. In the technical assessment report, this corresponded to 1,106,027,617 t CO2 eq per year (mean 1996–2005) for application to results for 2006–2010, and 907,959,466 t CO2 eq per year (mean 1996–2010) for results for 2011–2015. Brazil later submitted an updated Amazon biome FREL (reference period 1996–2015), assessed at 751,780,503.37 t CO2 eq per year, continuing to represent gross emissions from clear-cut deforestation (CO2 only) using biomass and litter pools. Brazil also submitted a Cerrado biome FREL assessed at 335,540,289 t CO2 eq per year for 2000–2010, covering gross deforestation and including non-CO2 emissions from post-deforestation fire (CH4 and N2O).

In 2023, Brazil submitted a national FREL/FRL package covering deforestation for all six biomes, and forest degradation and enhancement of forest carbon stocks for the Amazon biome. The technical assessment reported an assessed FREL of 673,566,463.52 t CO2 eq per year (reference period 2016–2021) and an assessed FRL of −59,395,580 t CO2 eq per year (reference period 2014–2020). Activity data in the assessed submission drew on INPE satellite monitoring systems including PRODES (clear-cut deforestation) and DETER (degradation alerts), and used TerraClass information to represent natural regeneration in previously deforested areas in the Amazon biome. The UNFCCC REDD+ Web Platform lists the forest monitoring system as "reported" for Brazil's earlier biome-level submissions, while the 2023 submission lists it as "not reported" on the platform.

== Measures to combat deforestation ==
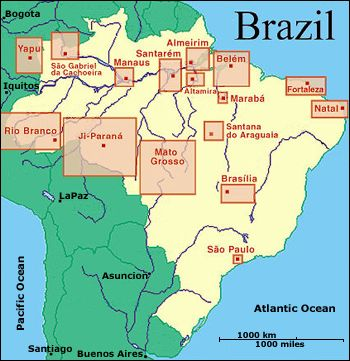
Areas of large scale atmosphere-biosphere experiments in Amazonia aim to monitor and regulate the impact of deforestation on the atmosphere.

By the end of the 1980s, the removal of Brazil's forests had become a serious global issue, not only because of the loss of biodiversity and ecological disruption, but also because of the large amounts of carbon dioxide (CO_{2}) released from burned forests and the loss of a valuable sink to absorb global CO_{2} emissions. At the 1992 UN Framework Convention on Climate Change, deforestation became a key issue addressed at the summit in Rio de Janeiro. Plans for the compensated reduction (CR) of greenhouse gas emissions from tropical forests were set up to give nations like Brazil an incentive to curb their rate of deforestation.

"We are encouraging the Brazilian government to fully endorse the Compensated Reduction proposal", said scientist Paulo Moutinho, coordinator of the climate change program of the Amazon Institute for Environmental Research (IPAM), an NGO research institute in Brazil.

On May 11, 1994, NASA scientists, Compton Tucker and David Skole concluded that satellite observations showed a reduction in the rate of forest removal between 1992 and 1993 and that World Bank estimates of 600,000 square km^{2} (12%) cleared to that point appeared to be too high. The NASA assessment concurred with the findings of the Brazilian National Space Research Institute (INPE) of an estimated 280,000 km^{2} (5%) in the same period.

The following year (1995) deforestation nearly doubled; this has been attributed to the accidental fire following the El Niño-related drought rather than active logging; the following year again showed a major drop. In 2002, Brazil ratified the Kyoto Agreement as a developing nation listed in the non-Annex I countries. These countries do not have carbon emission quotas in the agreement as developed nations do. President Luiz Inácio Lula da Silva reiterated that Brazil: "is in charge of looking after the Amazon".

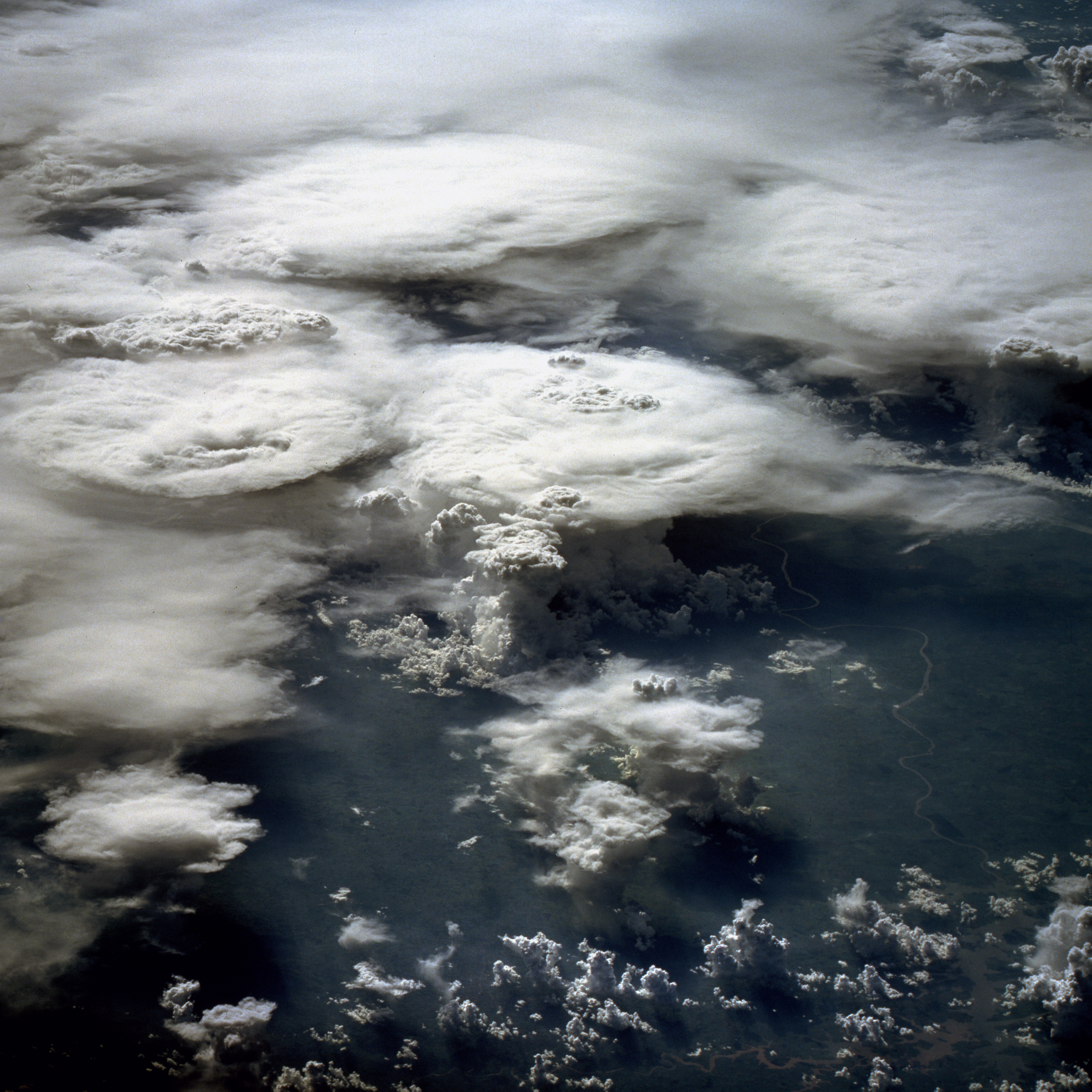
Weather patterns above the Amazon has taken on board a shuttle in orbit in February 1984. Deforestation in Brazil has and will have a major impact on the climate system and rainfall, according to scientists.

In 2006, Brazil proposed a direct finance project to deal with the Reduced Emissions from Deforestation and Degradation in Developing Countries, or REDD, issue, recognizing that deforestation contributes to 20% of the world's greenhouse gas emissions. The competing proposal for the REDD issue was a carbon emission credit system, where reduced deforestation would receive "marketable emissions credits". In effect, developed countries could reduce their carbon emissions, and approach their emissions quota by investing in the reforestation of developing rainforest countries. Instead, Brazil's 2006 proposal would draw from a fund based on donor country contributors.

By 2005, forest removal had fallen to 9,000 km^{2} (3,500 sq mi) of forest compared to 18,000 km^{2} (6,900 sq mi) in 2003 and on July 5, 2007, Brazilian president Luiz Inácio Lula da Silva announced at the International Conference on Biofuels in Brussels that more than 20 million hectares of conservation units to protect the forest and more efficient fuel production had allowed the rate of deforestation to fall by 52% in the three years since 2004.

Under Brazilian law, private actors who occupy and develop land not in productive use may appeal the government for ownership of said land. Private actors therefore often convert land to agricultural use in order to gain a property title. Due to weak enforcement of property rights in Brazil, this may also lead to land-related violence. The government often protects some areas, making them incontestible by private actors. Such protections lead to decreased agricultural conversion and violence, but increased logging and use as single-season pastures.

In 2005, Brazilian Environment Minister Marina da Silva announced that 9,000 km^{2} (3,500 sq mi) of forest had been felled in the previous year, compared with more than 18,000 km^{2} (6,900 sq mi) in 2003 and 2004. Between 2005 and 2006 there was a 41% drop in deforestation; nonetheless, Brazil still had the largest area of forest removed annually on the planet.

These methods have also reduced the illegal appropriation of land and logging, encouraging the use of land for sustainable timber harvesting.

At the end of August 2019 after an international outcry and warning from experts that fires can increase even more, the Brazilian government of Jair Bolsonaro begun to take measures to stop the fires in the Amazon rainforest. The measures include:

- 60 day ban for clearing forest with fires.
- Sending 44,000 soldiers to fight the fires.
- Accepting 4 planes from Chile for battle the fires.
- Accepting 12 million dollars of aid from the United Kingdom government
- Softening his position about aid from the G7.
- Appealing for a Latin America conference to preserve the Amazon

=== 2019 ===
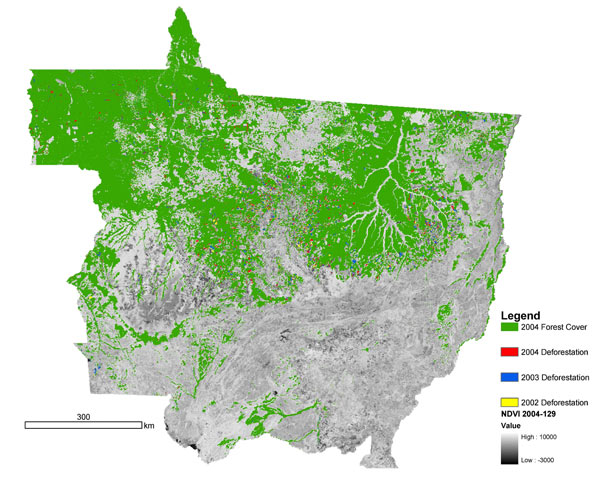
A NASA observation of forest cover and deforestation in the state of Mato Grosso for 2004.

To diminish deforestation in the Brazilian Amazon, some organisations have argued that large financial resources are required to give illegal loggers an economic incentive to pursue other areas of activity. The World Wide Fund for Nature (WWF) estimated in 2007 that a total of approximately US$547.2 million (1 billion Brazilian reais) per year would be required from international sources to compensate the forest developers and establish a highly organized framework to fully implement forest governance and monitoring, and the foundation of new protected forest areas in the Amazon for future sustainability.

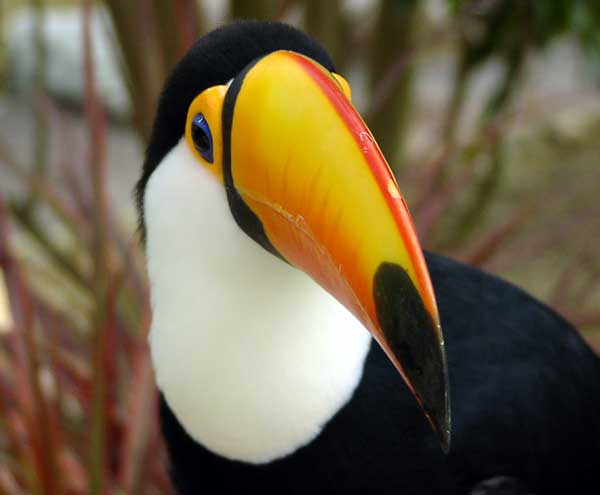
Toco toucan. The biodiversity of Brazil's rainforests is under threat.

Non-governmental organizations (NGOs) such as WWF have been active in the region, and WWF Brazil formed an alliance with eight other Brazilian NGOs who aimed to completely halt deforestation in the Amazon by 2015. However, deforestation continues; in July 2019, the rate reached a four-year high. Deforestation has rapidly increased over 30 percent since 2018 according to the INPE. The Amazon's deforestation has been seen to be at its highest levels since 2008. This could have long-term implications for the health of the region and its significant impact on the functionality of the global ecosystem. Models suggest that the Amazon may be reaching a tipping point due to the deforestation and rising temperatures.

Under Jair Bolsonaro's government, who took office in January 2019, policies surrounding deforestation have relaxed. Bolsonaro and other senior figures have encouraged the exploitation of the Amazon rainforest, denigrated critics and denied man-made climate change. Some environmental laws have been weakened and there has been a cut in funding and personnel at key government agencies and a firing of the heads of the agency's state bodies.

In 2019 an initiative has been made by the NGO RioTerra and the organization Reforest'Action. This initiative is intended to make more efforts to reduce deforestation and restore degraded areas. Slash-and-burn farming is a big part of the problem in the fight against deforestation, and this is something that is focused on in this project. The goal is to plant 120,000 trees, use agroforestry to reduce deforestation, help diversify forest fruit production, store carbon to fight climate change, and provide food security. Agroforestry is a way of agriculture in forested areas combining planting and managing trees with farming and cattle ranching. The project should benefit from multiple environmental problems caused by deforestation like conserving biodiversity, improving the water cycle and generating income for the local population from the sale of non-wood products and fruit providing more food security. Not to mention that the trees act as carbon storage, caused by cutting and burning trees. Besides that, the planting of trees helps restore cleared or burned areas of land and make agroforestry possible.

=== 2023 ===
In 2023 the World Bank, published a report named: "A Balancing Act for Brazil's Amazonian States: An Economic Memorandum". The report stating, that economic losses due to deforestation in Brazil could reach around 317 billion dollars per year, approximately 7 times higher in comparison to the cost of all commodities produced through deforestation, proposed another economic program in the region of the Amazon rainforest. For example, it proposed to link cities with help of rivers and not roads.

== See also ==
- 2018 in Brazil
- 2019 Amazon rainforest wildfires
- Agriculture in Brazil
- Amazon rainforest § Deforestation
- Brazilian Institute of Environment and Renewable Natural Resources (IBAMA)
- Carbon Border Adjustment Mechanism
- Coffee plantation
- Coffee production in Brazil
- Deforestation in Paraguay
- Deforestation of the Amazon Rainforest
- Environment of Brazil
- Environmental issues in Brazil
- Environmental history of Latin America
- Stern Review's cost estimates of climate change
- Rainforest Alliance
