= 2019 Northeast Brazil oil spill =

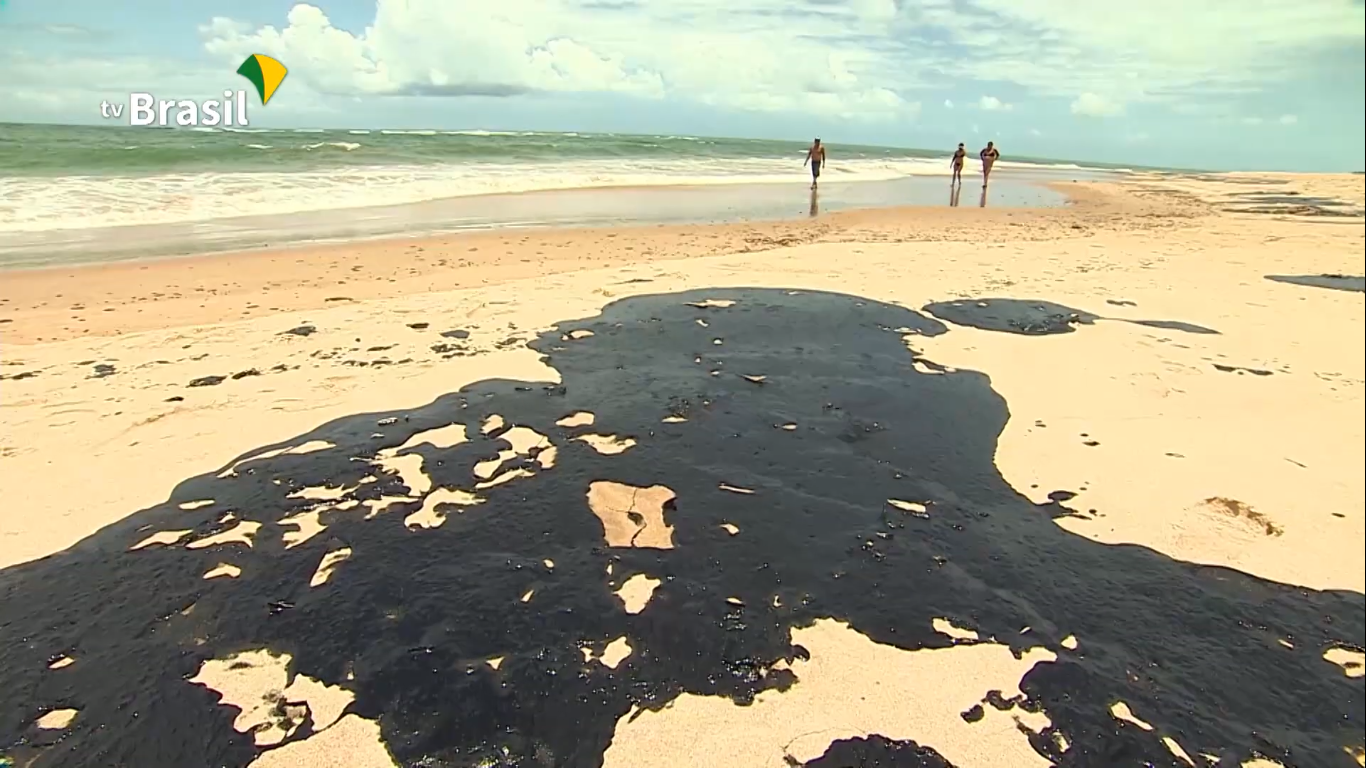
- Oil spots on a beach in northeastern Brazil
- Location: Northeastern Brazil and Southeastern Brazil Coastline, >750 localities affected.
- Coordinates: 13.061°S 38.476°W
- Date: 30 August 2019 — 2020

Cause
- Cause: Unconfirmed

Spill characteristics
- Volume: > 5,000-12,000 tonnes
- Shoreline impacted: Northeast Brazil and Southeastern Brazil

In 2019, a spill of crude oil in northeastern Brazil affected Brazilian jurisdictional waters and over 2,250 km (1,400 mi) of coastline. The spill was first reported on 30 August 2019. The origin of the oil spill is unconfirmed but stated to not be Brazilian. By the end of October 2019, over 1,000 tonnes had been cleaned up; the spill had contaminated portions of all nine states of Brazil's Northeast Region.

It is the worst oil spill in Brazilian history and the largest environmental disaster ever recorded on the Brazilian coast or any tropical coastal region worldwide.

== Origin ==
With circumstances still under investigation, the first reports of the spill were made on 2 September 2019.

The amount of oil currently affecting Brazil from the spill has been described as "thousands of barrels". The origin of the oil spill, of a type not produced in Brazil, is still unconfirmed but a Greek-flagged ship, the NM Bouboulina, belonging to Delta Tankers Ltd is suspected. Investigations by the Brazilian Navy and Petrobras found chemical links with Venezuelan oil, but that does not necessarily mean Venezuela is responsible. The Venezuelan government denied responsibility for the disaster and said that their country's only oil company, the state-run PDVSA, had not received any reports from clients or subsidiaries about any oil spills near Brazil. The chemical tests also determined that the oil was all from one source. Several barrels have washed up on beaches. Prior to testing, the Navy had asked 30 tankers from ten countries that passed by the Brazilian coast if they had spilled any oil.

The Brazilian government has been unable to map the oil slicks. The oil is floating beneath the surface of the ocean and thus difficult to trace and predict; this also means that floating oil barriers had little to no effect.

== Spread and clean-up ==
As of 23 October, contamination had reached more than 200 localities within the nine states of Northeast Brazil. More than 1,000 tonnes of oil had been collected from beaches along the 2,250 km (1,400 mi) of coastline affected.

According to the Ministry of Defense, about 5,500 Navy, Army and Air Force personnel were involved with cleaning the beaches of the Northeast, as were staff from the National Agency of Petroleum, Natural Gas and Biofuels (ANP), the Brazilian Institute of Environment and Renewable Natural Resources (Ibama), the Chico Mendes Institute for Biodiversity Conservation (ICMBio), and the National Secretariat of Protection and Civil Defense; additionally, thousands of volunteers worked at the beaches.

Within the state of Bahia a civilian group called Coast Guardians was started with volunteers to clean up the coast, gaining popularity online and crowdfunding money for protective clothing. The group organized 20 beach teams. Staff from the local environment agency and some Naval officers helped two beach teams. Civilians in various parts of the region also built nets to place between the ocean and its tributaries to prevent contamination of the country's rivers.

== Impact ==
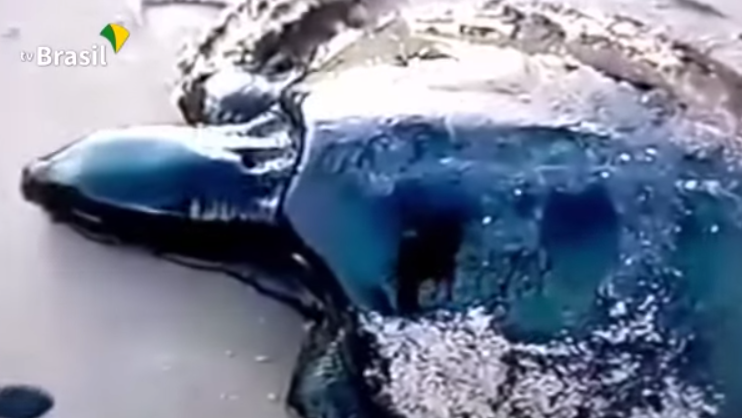
Oil-covered sea turtle

On 21 October, a team of oceanographers, chemists, and state officials visited the Todos os Santos Bay in Salvador, Bahia, to assess the impact of the oil's movement along the coast. At this point, the spill had left a toxic trail for thousands of miles and begun degrading mangroves and corals; this contamination is hard to clean and will remain in the environment for years.

In addition to the risk to the ecosystem, there is the possibility for people to come into direct contact with contaminants that remain in the environment. Harmful levels of contact could happen just from walking on a beach where oil has been in the sea, involuntarily touching oil residue or inhaling the gases released. There is substantial risk for Brazil's mangroves, corals, and marine life as a whole, which will take decades to mitigate, and to humans, as the chemicals can also cause irritation and allergic reactions, especially on the skin, eyes, and mouth. Birds have also been oiled and remain at risk, including migratory species.

To alert the population, the Rio Grande do Norte Institute for Sustainable Development and Environment (Idema), including the TAMAR project, developed educational materials showing procedures that should be followed in case of contact with oil for both humans and animals. The Tamar Project also reported that while adult turtles were being killed, the oil slicks at beaches also prevented the newly hatching baby turtles from reaching the sea, counting 800 rescued babies.

The oil spill also hit some of the most frequented tourist beaches in the area, which received safety warnings from the tourism and fishing sectors by the end of October.

== Responses and protests ==
Brazilian President Jair Bolsonaro first reported Venezuela as the origin, then later asserted that environment campaigners caused the spill in order to stop the government signing more oil deals. He has also been criticized for not visiting the affected areas, and for passing the disaster management to the wider government, with the Vice President making relevant announcements. The Brazilian senate environment committee has criticized the executive for not declaring a climate emergency; in April 2019, Bolsonaro had also closed two committees that were part of the national contingency plans for dealing with oil spills. In late October, Bolsonaro responded to a statement by Environment Minister Ricardo Salles by blaming Greenpeace for the spill, calling it a "terrorist act".

On 22 October 2019, a group of fishermen protested in front of Ibama headquarters in Salvador. Football teams in Brazil found creative ways to protest government inaction regarding the oil spill: in one match, one team wore custom shirts with black patches over their team design, while the other wore black gloves.

== See also ==
- Petrobras 36
