= Brazilian Institute of Environment and Renewable Natural Resources =

Environmental agency in Brazil

Brazilian Institute of the Environment and Renewable Natural Resources
- Instituto Brasileiro do Meio Ambiente e dos Recursos Naturais Renováveis

Agency overview
- Formed: February 22, 1989
- Jurisdiction: Federal government of Brazil
- Headquarters: Brasília, Distrito Federal, Brazil; 15°46′2″S 47°51′41″W
- Parent agency: Ministério do Meio Ambiente e Mudança do Clima
- Website: www.gov.br/ibama/pt-br

The Brazilian Institute of the Environment and Renewable Natural Resources (Portuguese: Instituto Brasileiro do Meio Ambiente e dos Recursos Naturais Renováveis, IBAMA) is a government agency under the administration of the Brazilian Ministry of the Environment. IBAMA was created in 1988 by President José Sarney. IBAMA supports anti-deforestation of the Amazon, and implements laws against deforestation where the government ceases to implement. The agency is also tasked with regulating illegal wildlife trafficking, pollution, oil spills, and other environmental crimes. IBAMA engages in armed enforcement, using tactical personnel to keep the forest from loggers, farming, agricultural farm grazing and anything that would threaten the Amazon. The current President of IBAMA is Rodrigo Agostinho.

IBAMA is different from the Chico Mendes Institute for Biodiversity Conservation in that the latter administrates protected areas within the Brazilian territory, whereas the former administrates environmental regulation.

== History ==
Created by Law No. 7,735 of February 22, 1989, IBAMA was formed by the merger of four Brazilian entities that worked in the environmental area: the Secretariat for the Environment (SEMA), the Rubber Superintendence (SUDHEVEA), the Fisheries Superintendence (SUDEPE) and the Brazilian Forestry Development Institute (IBDF). With the merger, it became responsible for implementing the National Environmental Policy (PNMA), which was instituted by Law No. 6,938 of August 31, 1981.

== Fines and punishment ==
IBAMA has increased its use of remote surveillance since 2023. IBAMA identifies areas of deforestation and assesses who owns the affected areas. IBAMA then implements embargoes and fines on the owner of the land. Embargoes can also include cattle seizures to dissuade future offenders. The value of agency fines increased by 167% in 2023 from the 2019-2022 period along with embargoed areas increasing by 111%. Despite this, there have been deadly incidents between IBAMA's tactical field personnel and illegal violators.

== IBAMA under Lula ==
Brazil's current President Luiz Inácio Lula da Silva made ambitious pledges on deforestation. One notable pledge was to end illegal deforestation by 2030. IBAMA is central to these plans as it often acts as an enforcement agency against illegal deforestation in Brazil. IBAMA often surveys and protects land in the Amazon from illegal mining and logging. Brazil underwent a 50% reduction in deforestation in 2023 signaling progress towards these plans. With Brazil's environment Minister Marina Silva crediting IBAMA's efforts. However, over 1,500 workers within Brazil's federal anti-deforestation agencies IBAMA and ICMbio demanded better pay and working conditions from President Lula in a letter in December 2023.

== IBAMA under Bolsonaro ==
Jair Bolsonaro, Brazil's former President, endured a large amount of criticism over his handling of deforestation and illegal mining in Brazil. Indigenous people in particular suffered encroachment on a large scale by illegal miners. In 2019 a dispute between IBAMA and Bolsonaro over a government contract for rental vehicles led to the resignation of Suely de Araujo, the President of IBAMA at the time. Bolsonaro claimed the agency had irregularities in its budget. This was disputed by IBAMA officials. IBAMA also saw its funds slashed by 30% from 2019-2020 under Bolsonaro. Along with its employee numbers dropping by 55% from 1,311 to 591 between 2010 and 2019. Bolsonaro also implemented "Reconciliation hearings" in 2019. Individuals and companies could reduce or cancel fines based on the hearing. Seventeen thousand hearings were backed up as of 2021 with fines expiring if they had not been heard by three years. Nine hundred Ibama and ICMBio employees signed a letter protesting the working conditions in 2021 under pressure to reduce the backlog and facing penalties if they failed to do so.

== Terra Brasilis Operation ==
On March 3, 2022, IBAMA announced the Terra Brasilis Operation. It is a program aimed at assessing biodiversity in Brazil and its use. IBAMA hopes prevent illegal use through fines and embargoes.

== Spix's macaw ==
Among IBAMA's diverse environmental and natural resources activities, it manages The Working Group for the Recovery of the Spix's macaw and the associated Ararinha Azul project for conserving one of the rarest birds in the world. However the last Spix's macaw living in the wilderness disappeared in 2000 and the species became extinct in the wild.

== See also ==
- Belo Monte Dam
- Environmentalism in Rio Grande do Sul
