= Climate finance in Brazil =

Climate finance in Brazil drives the transition to a low-carbon economy, as well as climate change adaptation and mitigation. The country receives resources from various sources, such as international development institutions and the private sector.

Brazil occupies a large portion of the South American continent and is considered a megadiverse country, with species spread across six terrestrial biomes and three marine ecosystems. Greenhouse gas emissions in the country come primarily from land use (about 44% from forest burning) and agriculture.

Recent extreme events demonstrate Brazil's exposure: for example, official studies recorded that approximately 295,000 people were displaced by climate disasters in 2019. In light of this, the federal government has elevated the environmental agenda, recognizing sustainability as a national development priority and seeking to integrate climate goals into the economy. The United Nations Environment Programme (UNEP/UN) monitors biodiversity loss and supports initiatives that promote environmental conservation and the sustainable use of natural resources.

Among the national challenges is the coordination of sectoral and financial policies across different levels of government. A recent study notes difficulties in coordinating actions under the new Climate Plan with other public investment programs, such as the Growth Acceleration Program (PAC), which follow disconnected sectoral visions. On the other hand, Brazil has the potential to attract resources.

== Brazilian context ==
=== Climate vulnerabilities ===
Map of the Köppen-Geiger climate classification of Brazil for the period 1980–2016

Map of the Köppen-Geiger climate classification of Brazil in the most pessimistic scenario for the period 2071–2100

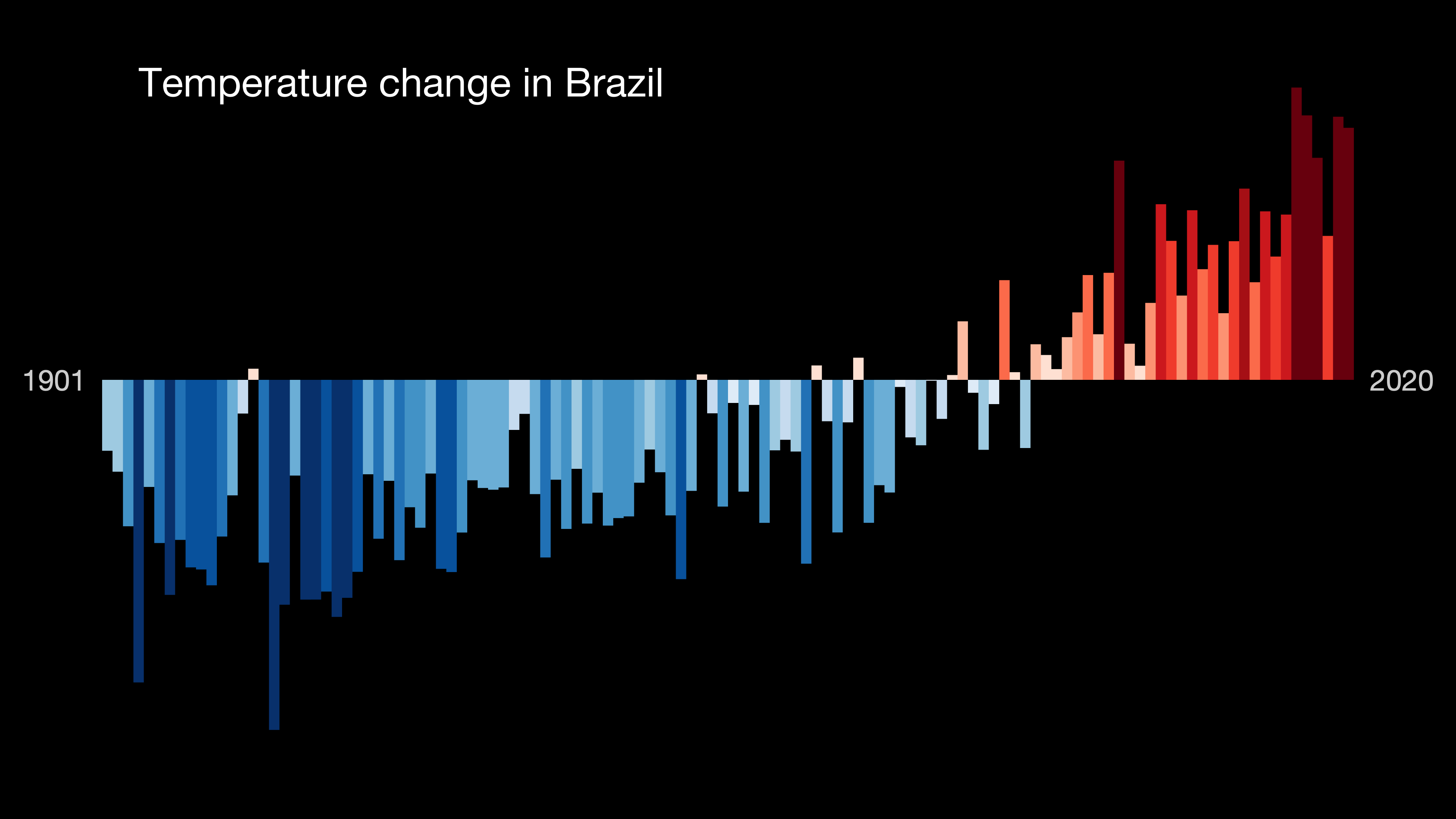
Historical temperature metrics in Brazil, 1901-2021

Torrential rains caused losses exceeding R$55.5 billion between 2017 and 2022, damaged more than 549,000 homes, and affected approximately 28.9 million people. On the other hand, prolonged droughts and heat waves reduce agricultural and water productivity; it is estimated that between 2013 and 2022, Brazil lost US$19.5 billion in annual income due to excessive heat (6 billion hours of work lost per year). These phenomena, which include episodes such as the April/May 2024 floods in the South and droughts in the Amazon. Studies by the National Institute for Space Research and international agencies show that, without action, adverse weather can exacerbate inequalities and increase costs in sectors such as health and agriculture. Thus, climate finance is needed not only to cut emissions, but also to strengthen adaptation and reduce future negative economic impacts.

Brazil occupies a large portion of the South American continent and is considered a megadiverse country, with species spread across six terrestrial biomes and three marine ecosystems. However, up to 90% of Brazilian species could be negatively impacted by climate change, with about a quarter of them at potential risk of extinction. Between 2020 and 2023, extreme weather events affected 32 million people and caused losses of 45.9 billion reais.

Brazil's energy matrix, with 83% renewable sources, represents a positive differential, but the energy sector still accounts for 18.22% of national greenhouse gas emissions. The country has set a national target of reducing emissions by 59% to 67% by 2035, compared to 2005 levels, seeking to contribute to the 1.5°C global warming limit established in the Paris Agreement. The United Nations Environment Programme (UNEP/UN) monitors biodiversity loss and supports initiatives that promote environmental conservation and the sustainable use of natural resources.

=== Energy panorama ===
Electricity production in Brazil, 2019
1. Hydroelectricity (63.7%)
2. Wind energy (9.20%)
3. Biomass (9.00%)
4. Natural gas (8.10%)
5. Petroleum (5.40%)
6. Coal (2.00%)
7. Photovoltaics (1.30%)
8. Nuclear energy (1.30%)

The Brazilian energy sector is one of the least carbon-intensive in the world, a direct result of the high share of renewable sources in the energy matrix and the historical dependence on hydropower. It is estimated that approximately 45% of primary energy demand in Brazil is met by renewable sources. Since 1990, electricity consumption has more than doubled, driven by economic growth and increased transportation demands. Approximately 80% of the electricity generated in the country still comes from large hydroelectric plants.

As a result of prolonged drought events, there was a strategic move towards diversification with investments in solar, wind, and bioenergy. These investments are encouraged by a favorable regulatory environment, anchored in a national energy auction system, which drives private capital for generation and expansion of transmission infrastructure. The auction policy helps to expand installed capacity and mitigate risks related to long-term energy security.

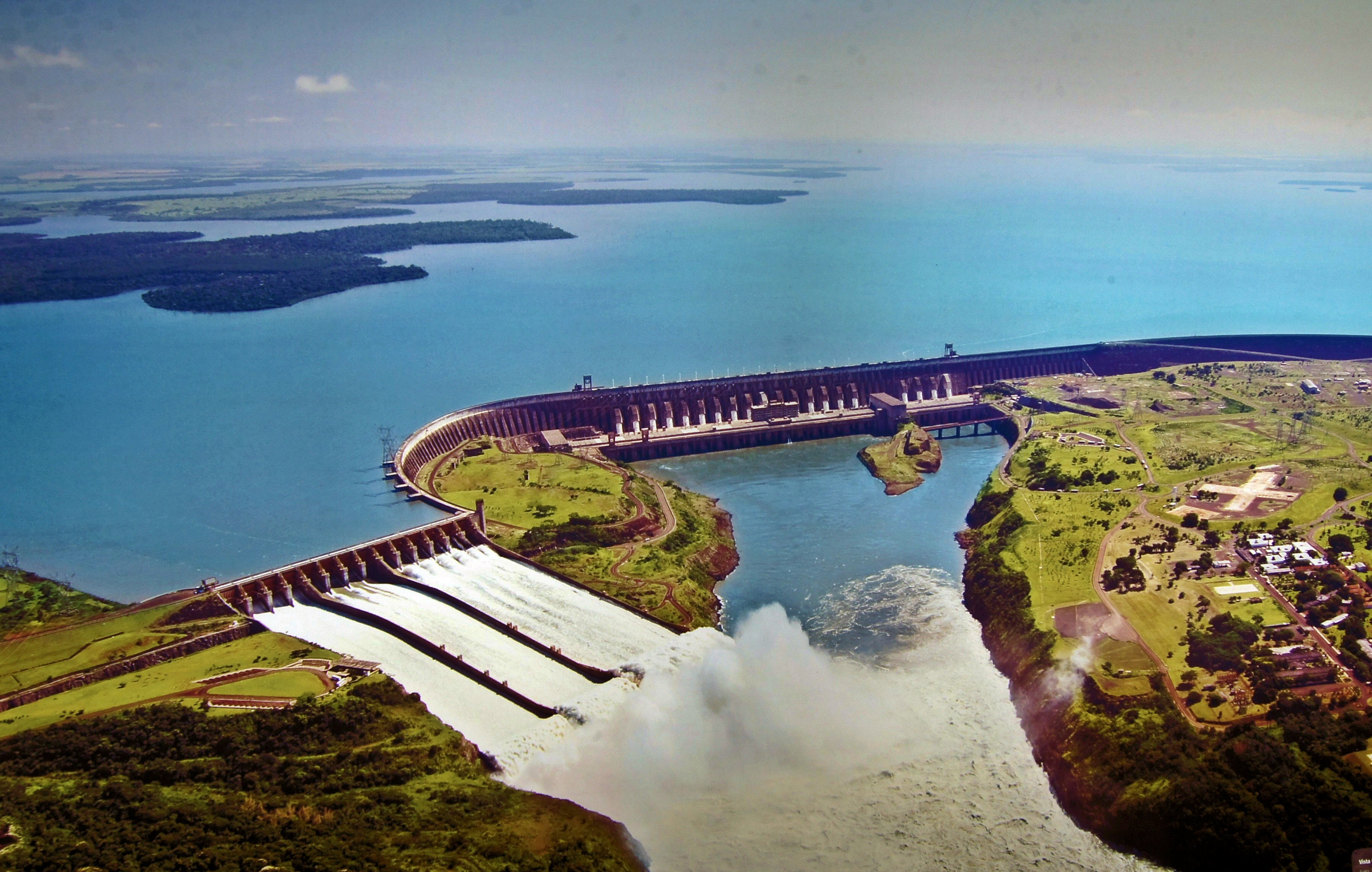
2011 aerial image of the Itaipu Hydroelectric Power Plant, Brazil's main hydroelectric power plant.

Brazil is the main energy producer in Latin America and leads the region in energy exports, with a 1.579% growth in export volume between 2000 and 2023. The majority of Brazil's total energy supply comes from oil (37%), followed by biofuels and waste (33%). Domestic production is composed mainly of crude oil (49.7%), biofuels (29%), hydropower (10%), and natural gas (8.4%). Oil refining capacity has increased by 32% in recent decades, improving the production of derivatives.

Total electricity generation in Brazil reached 707,596 GWh in 2023. The installed capacity of the electricity grid exceeds 150 GW.

To modernize the grid, approximately US$1.2 billion was allocated in 2024, with a projection of reaching US$4.2 billion by 2032. The sectors that consume the most electricity are transportation (37%), industry (34%), and residential use (12%). The average price of electricity increased from US$159.21 per MWh in 2022 to US$165.83 per MWh in 2023. On average, Brazilians spend about 4.5% of their annual income on electricity bills. Among the factors driving up costs are water shortages and rising tariffs, which impact inflation.

=== Climate finance and legal frameworks ===
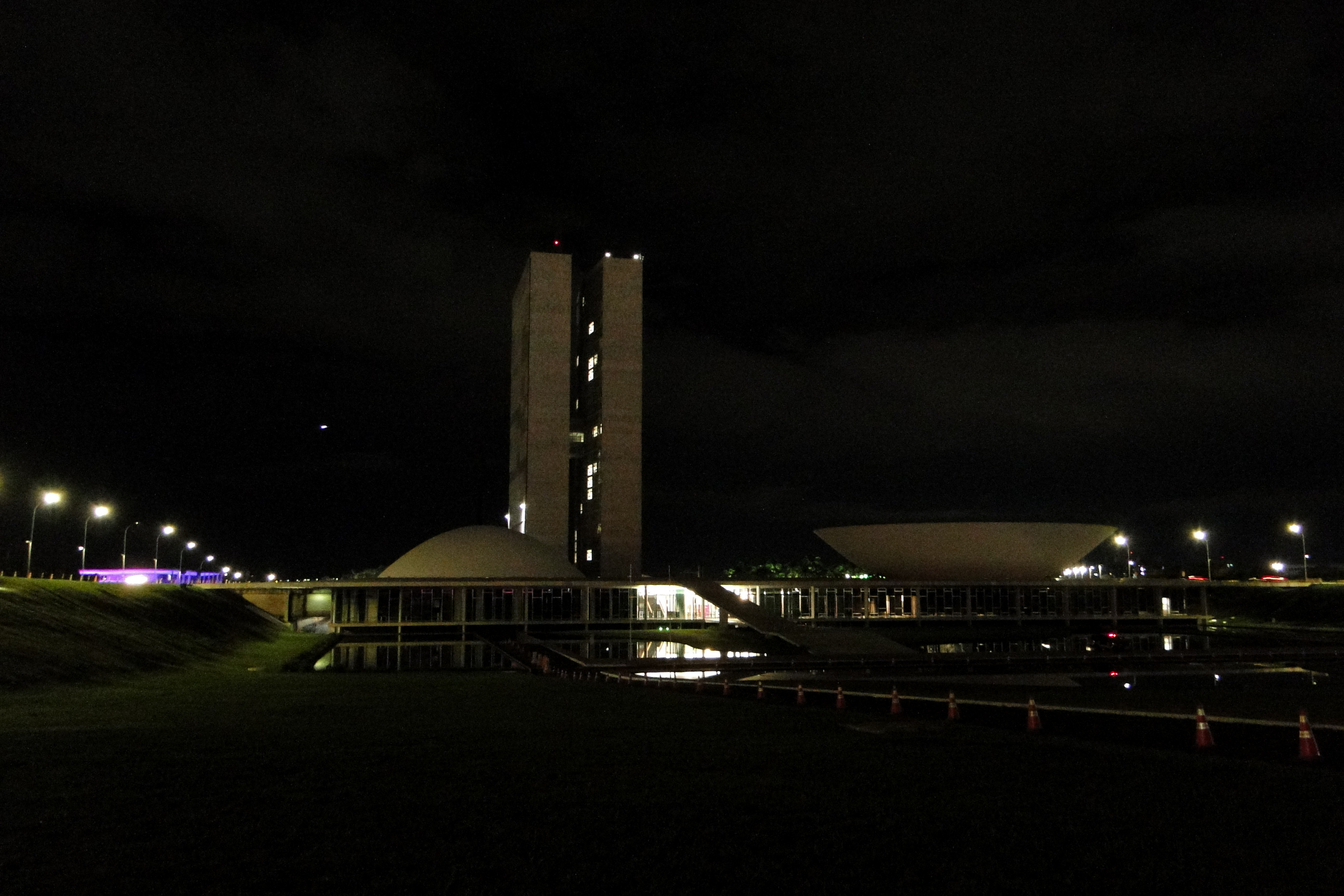
National Congress of Brazil during Earth Hour 2025

Climate finance in Brazil has been consolidated since the mid-2000s through various government initiatives and international partnerships. In 2008, the country created the Amazon Fund it proposed at COP13, managed by BNDES and focused on REDD+ actions for forest protection. The following year (Law 12.114/2009), the National Fund on Climate Change (Fundo Clima) was established, with resources for mitigation and adaptation projects. In the agricultural sector, the Low Carbon Agriculture Program (Plano ABC), launched in 2010 by the Ministry of Agriculture, offered subsidized agricultural credit lines (2 billion reais at 5.5% per year in 2010/11) for sustainable technologies, although in the first year only 20% of these resources were used.

In the 2010s, Brazil expanded the scope of climate finance with multilateral and private instruments. National companies began issuing green bonds to finance renewable energy and efficiency; for example, BRF launched the first Brazilian green bond in 2015. Multilateral institutions financed key programs: in 2022, the Inter-American Development Bank (IDB) approved US$250 million (US$75 million of which came from the Green Climate Fund) for the BB Amazônia Program for a sustainable bioeconomy, implemented by Banco do Brasil. In the same year, the World Bank allocated a US$500 million loan to Banco do Brasil for credit lines linked to emissions reductions. At the federal level, in 2024 the Brazil Climate Investment Platform (BIP) was launched to coordinate strategic public and private projects in sectors such as bioeconomy, green industry and energy, with the support of BNDES and international partners (Bloomberg Philanthropies, GFANZ, GCF).

Deforestation rates in Brazil since 1988, highlighted by government periods

The national legal framework encompasses laws and agencies dedicated to climate change. Law No. 12,187/2009 established the National Policy on Climate Change (PNMC), and Law No. 12,114/2009 created the National Fund on Climate Change (FNMC). Subsequent decrees, such as 7,343/2010, and government resolutions, such as CMN resolution 4,267/2013, regulate these instruments. At the institutional level, the main climate governance body is the Interministerial Committee on Climate Change (CIM), chaired by the Civil House (with the MMA as executive secretary), reactivated in June 2023. The Ministry of the Environment and Climate Change (MMA) coordinates federal policy, with support from the Ministry of Science and Technology (MCTI) in environmental monitoring and from other sectoral ministries. The FNMC, linked to the MMA, allocates accounting resources to mitigation and adaptation projects, applying reimbursable credits via BNDES and non-reimbursable credits via MMA. Another relevant fund is the Amazon Fund, administered by BNDES, which raises international donations for conservation and sustainable use projects in the Legal Amazon.

In 2024, the Brazilian Sustainable Taxonomy (TSB) was established by Decree 11.961/2024, creating the Interinstitutional Committee of the Brazilian Sustainable Taxonomy (CITSB), chaired by the Ministry of Finance. The TSB establishes specific criteria for classifying activities that contribute to climate, environmental, and social objectives. The regulation of the TSB will be the responsibility of sectoral bodies such as the Central Bank (BCB), the Securities and Exchange Commission (CVM), and the Superintendence of Private Insurance (SUSEP). Since 2022, the Central Bank has implemented mandatory climate testing and ESG requirements for financial institutions.

== Financing ==
=== Public ===
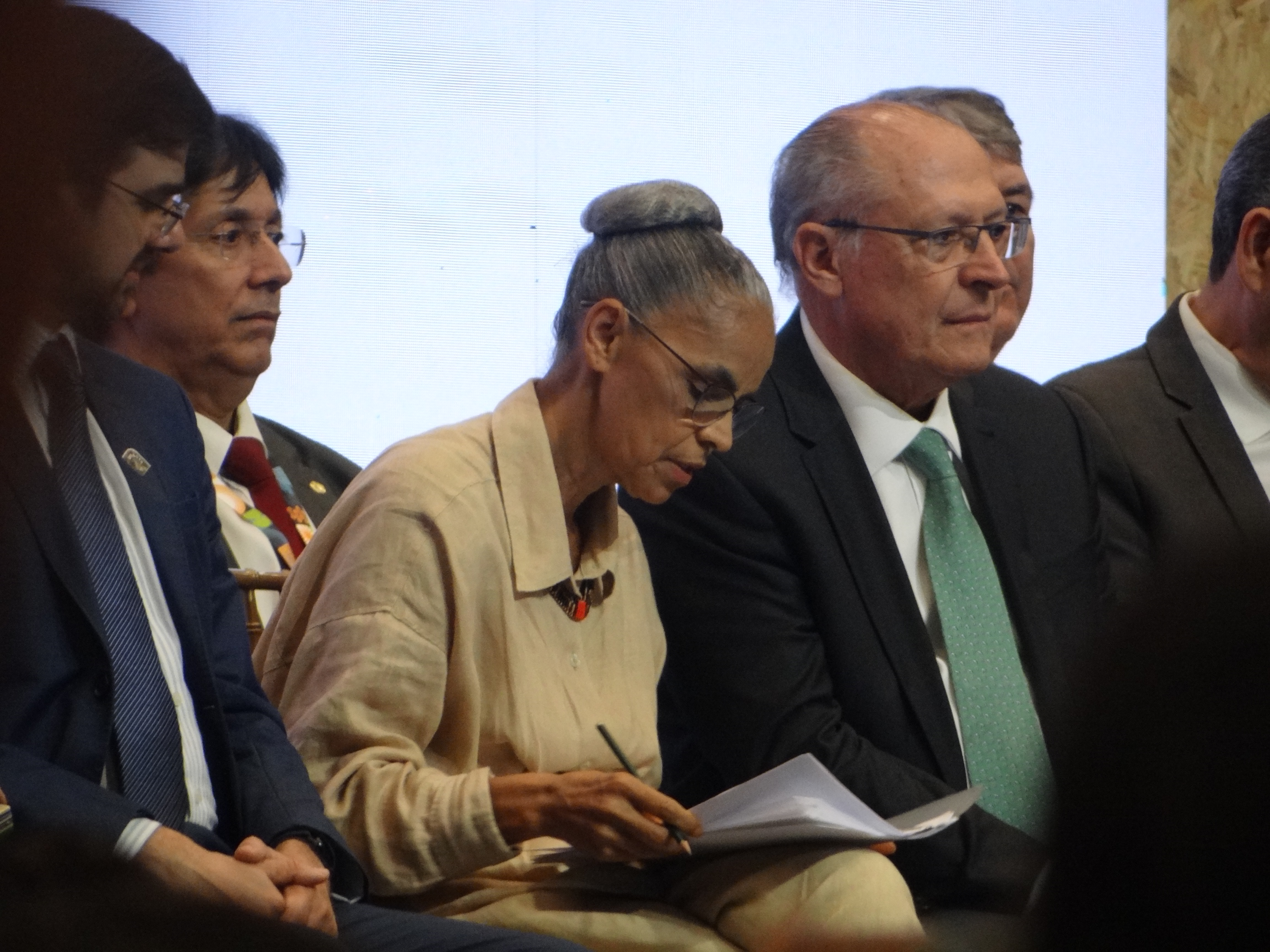
Marina Silva, Minister of Environment and Climate Change, and Geraldo Alckmin, Vice President, at the 5th National Environmental Conference in May 2025. Climate finance was a central point in the conference plenaries and, in the minister's words, "we have transformed nature into money. Now is the time to use money to preserve what we have and restore what was lost wisely, in a sustainable way."

The public sources of climate finance come from various national and subnational mechanisms. The National Fund on Climate Change (Fundo Clima ), created in 2009 and managed by BNDES under the coordination of the Ministry of the Environment, represents the main public climate finance instrument. At the regional level, the constitutional funds of the North, Northeast, and Central-West (FNO, FNE, FCO) stand out, which reserved portions of their budgets for "green" or "low-emission" lines – for example, the FNO allocated approximately R$1.6 billion to low-carbon agriculture and forest restoration, and the FCO raised R$500 million through the "FCO Verde" line for sustainable projects.

After a period of depletion during the Bolsonaro administration, when it had only 400 thousand reais in annual budget, the fund was reactivated in 2023 with 630 million reais and expanded to 10.4 billion reais in 2024. Interest rates vary according to the type of project: 1% per year for forest restoration, 6.15% for general projects and 8% for solar and wind energy.

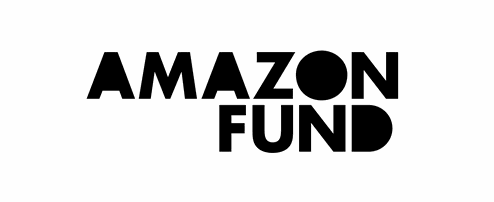
Amazon Fund Logo

The Amazon Fund, created in 2008 to receive international donations to combat deforestation, has raised 3.4 billion reais in donations in its history. After four years of inactivity, the fund broke its fundraising record in 2023 with 726 million reais, diversifying its donor base to include the United Kingdom, the United States, Switzerland, the European Union and Denmark, in addition to the traditional Norway and Germany.

BNDES, the main financier of renewable energy in the country, disbursed 133.8 billion reais between 2000 and 2020 for renewable projects. Between 2015 and 2020, the bank supported 138 projects with an installed capacity of 10,260 MW, enough to supply 16.4 million homes and benefit 54 million people.

The Alternative Energy Sources Incentive Program (PROINFA), created in 2002, offers long-term contracts for wind, solar, biomass, and small hydroelectric plants. Beginning in the 1990s, the federal government began privatizing energy distribution companies in the country, with energy auctions, held since 2004, offering long-term contracts for renewable energy projects.

=== Private ===
The private sector has a growing role in Brazilian climate finance. In recent years, companies and financial institutions have launched several green instruments. In 2024, for example, Brazil was the largest issuer of sustainable-labeled bonds in Latin America (approximately US$11 billion in total issuance), including corporate green bonds and thematic sovereign bonds (the second US$2 billion sovereign green bond was issued in 2023).

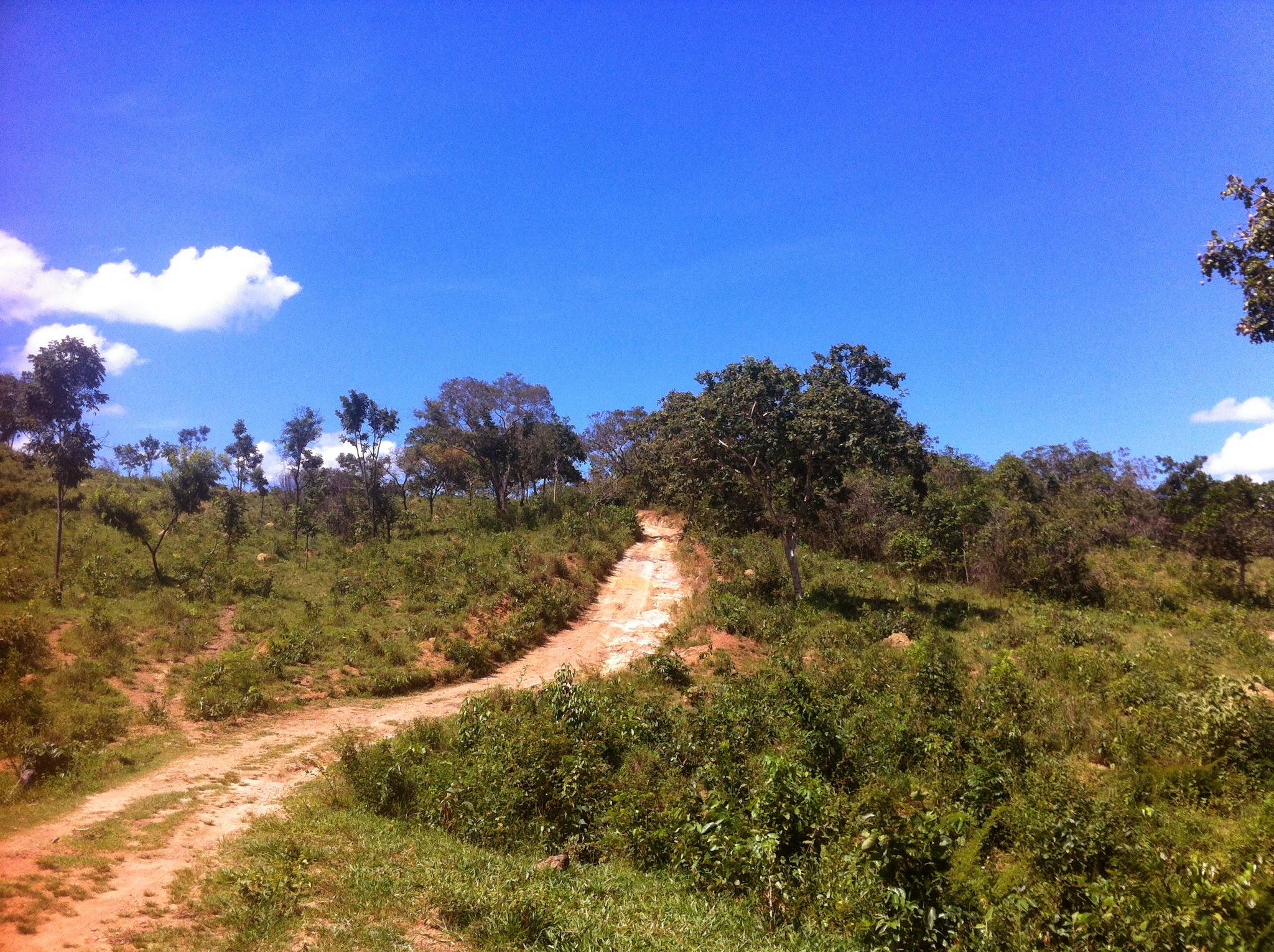
View of the Cerrado in Goiás. The Reverte Program works in the biome, recovering areas of degraded soil and transforming them into cropland.

Major Brazilian banks, such as Itaú, Bradesco, Banco do Brasil, and Santander, have developed green credit lines, sustainable bonds, and ESG funds. In 2025, Itaú issued 1.4 billion reais in sustainable bonds, with 400 million reais earmarked specifically for biodiversity through the Reverte Program, which has already restored 239,000 hectares of degraded land.

B3, one of the largest exchanges in Latin America, has created special designations for green bonds and green stocks. Brazil leads green bond issuances in Latin America, moving US$7.2 billion in 2022. The exchange has developed indices such as Ibovespa and IFIX, including companies in the renewable energy sector.

Foreign companies such as Enel, Iberdrola, Engie, and Equinor are investing in solar and wind farms and green hydrogen projects. Iberdrola announced investments of €47 billion between 2023 and 2025, with Brazil receiving 16% of the resources for grids (€ 4.3 billion) and 4% for renewables (€600 million). Instruments such as incentivized debentures for sustainable projects, ESG investment funds, and corporate green bonds are mobilizing billions of reais in private resources. Furthermore, private development banks and multilateral agencies, in partnership with the sector, are mobilizing guarantees and financial arrangements, as is the case with the $500 million World Bank and Banco do Brasil project, which is expected to attract $1.4 billion.

== Channeling and monitoring mechanisms ==
In Brazil, public climate resources are channeled primarily through development banks and multilateral agencies. BNDES is the main intermediary, operating both non-refundable funds (Amazon Fund) and subsidized credit lines (Climate Fund, ABC Plan) for mitigation and adaptation projects. Studies indicate that, between 2015 and 2020, BNDES approved an average of US$897 million per year in low-cost carbon credits, concentrated mainly in bioenergy and biofuels. In 2019, the bank was authorized as a direct access agency to the Green Climate Fund (GCF), allowing it to access international resources (loans and grants) for national projects. Banco do Brasil is also an important channel: it raised $175 million from the IDB itself and $75 million from the GCF for bioeconomy projects in the Amazon, and implemented the World Bank 's large $500 million loan aimed at low-carbon credit. In parallel, regional banks (such as BNB and Caixa) and private institutions offer green lines and specific guarantees.

These channels are complemented by direct multilateral support and the private market. Agencies such as the IDB, the World Bank, CAF, KfW, and the GCF itself offer co-financing lines and climate grants, while environmental foundations (e.g., Funbio) manage international resources for conservation. In the capital markets, Brazilian corporate issuers raised billions through thematic bonds: CPI estimates show that, from 2015 to 2020, an average of R$4 billion was raised annually in the land use sector through green bonds and environmental debentures. This majority of the funding was obtained abroad (69% of these issuances are from Brazilian companies selling "global notes" abroad).

The monitoring and accountability mechanisms for these resources combine formal regulations and recent innovations. Funds like Amazônia have specific governance bodies: the Steering Committee involves representatives from the government, civil society, and experts. BNDES publishes public reports on all operations and conducts periodic external audits. Analysts note that the disclosure of projects financed by the Amazon Fund has become much more transparent over time. At the federal level, Brazil submits biennial transparency reports to the UNFCCC that include emissions data and climate investments, but there is still no dedicated integrated national system to track all climate finance flows. Recent studies point to gaps in governance: the country's current structure is considered excessively centralized and fragmented, which hinders intersectoral coordination and visibility of climate investments. To strengthen oversight, initiatives such as the BNDES-UNDP partnership to implement ClimateScanner (TCU/INTOSAI), a digital audit tool that standardizes climate policy indicators in Brazil and worldwide, are emerging.

== International cooperation ==
Brazil receives and participates in international financial cooperation at various levels. Under the Paris Agreement, the country mobilizes resources from funds such as the Green Climate Fund (GCF) and the Global Environment Facility (GEF) through national projects (e.g., the Floresta+ Amazônia program received US$96 million from the GCF to reduce forest emissions). Germany and Norway have historically donated to the Amazon Fund (essential for REDD+ actions ), and recently, Germany (R$88 million in 2024) and the European Union (€20 million in forest support) have increased investments in Amazon conservation. Norway, the fund's largest donor, suspended R$133 million after governance disruptions in 2019 due to the environmental policies of the Jair Bolsonaro administration. In addition, the World Bank has allocated carbon credits (500 million dollars in 2022) to expand sustainable financing in Brazil (via Banco do Brasil), mobilizing foreign and private investments.

Brazil maintains strategic partnerships with the World Bank, the Inter-American Development Bank (IDB), and the Green Climate Fund. In 2024, the government signed a memorandum of understanding with the World Bank for a possible allocation of US$1 billion to the Climate Fund, focusing on reforestation, green cities, and solid waste management. Eco Invest Brasil, a program launched in 2024 with support from the IDB and the World Bank, aims to allocate 27 billion reais to private investments in sustainable transition projects, offering exchange rate protection to reduce risks associated with exchange rate volatility.

The Brazil Climate Investment and Ecological Transformation Platform (BIP), launched in 2024, represents an innovative initiative to mobilize national and international capital. The platform, hosted by BNDES (Brazilian Development Bank) and the secretariat, seeks to connect the government's ecological transformation plans with investors, supporting three main sectors: nature-based solutions, renewable energy, and energy efficiency.

== Impacts and results ==
Climate finance efforts are already producing concrete results, although not always on a scale significant enough to meet global targets. In the Amazon, for example, there was a decline of approximately 50% in deforestation between 2022 and 2023, attributed in part to increased monitoring and projects financed by the Amazon Fund. The Amazon Fund itself had approximately R$3.9 billion in international donations available in 2024 to support 114 restoration and deforestation prevention projects.

In the energy sector, investments in renewable energy parks have helped increase the share of clean energy sources in the national electricity grid, making Brazil one of the countries with the least polluting grids. The 2022 joint project between the World Bank and Banco do Brasil expects to generate up to 90 million tons of CO₂ reductions by 2030, equivalent to approximately 4.5% of Brazil's carbon neutrality target. Socially, forest management and climate infrastructure projects benefit rural and indigenous communities by generating green jobs and protecting environmental services (water, soil, biodiversity, etc.). However, recent floods affected 32 million people and destroyed 174,000 homes.

=== Main sectors benefited ===
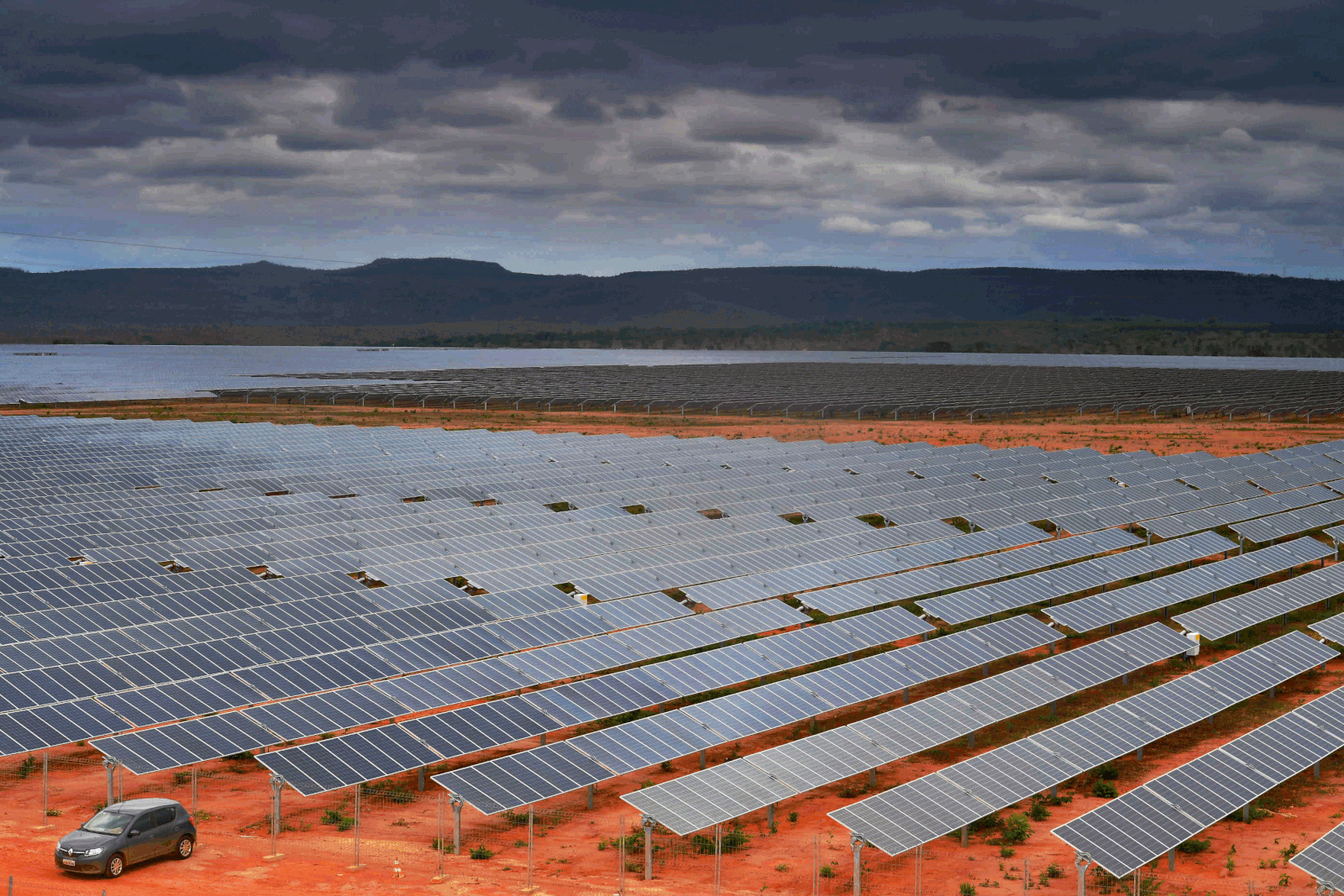
Pirapora Solar Complex, in Minas Gerais, the largest in Brazil and Latin America with a capacity of 321 MW.

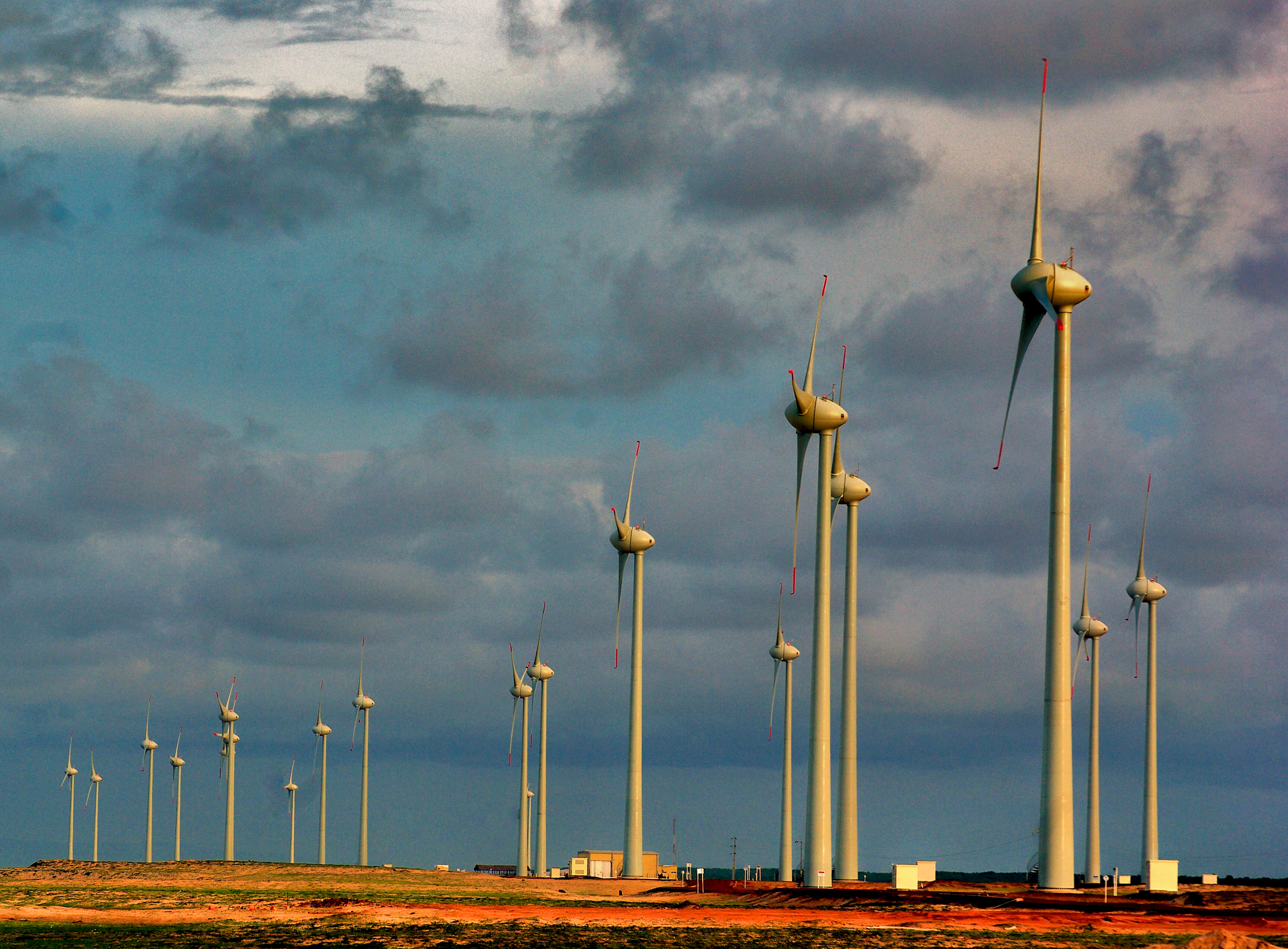
Wind turbines in Parnaíba, Piauí

Several sectors are focusing on climate finance projects and investments. In renewable energy and the energy transition, solar, wind, and hybrid power plants stand out, financed both by the private sector and by Climate Fund lines that support energy efficiency and green hydrogen research. In adaptation and resilience, urban programs invest in drainage, sanitation, and urban reforestation, while BNDES resources have already been allocated to resilient infrastructure projects.

In forest conservation and biodiversity (including REDD+), the Amazon Fund and similar mechanisms finance projects for managing conservation units, fighting fires, and restoring riparian forests. The agricultural and food security sectors are also a focus: there are credit lines for low-carbon practices and efficient irrigation projects, aiming to increase productivity without expanding deforestation (it is estimated that two-thirds of the necessary climate investments should go to agriculture and energy).

Sustainable mobility and green infrastructure support includes non-polluting public transportation, efficient lighting systems, and green highways, as provided for in financing lines targeted at low-emission urban mobility. Each of these sectors receives different shares of public and private resources, but they all share the goal of reducing emissions and increasing socio-environmental resilience.

== Prospects ==
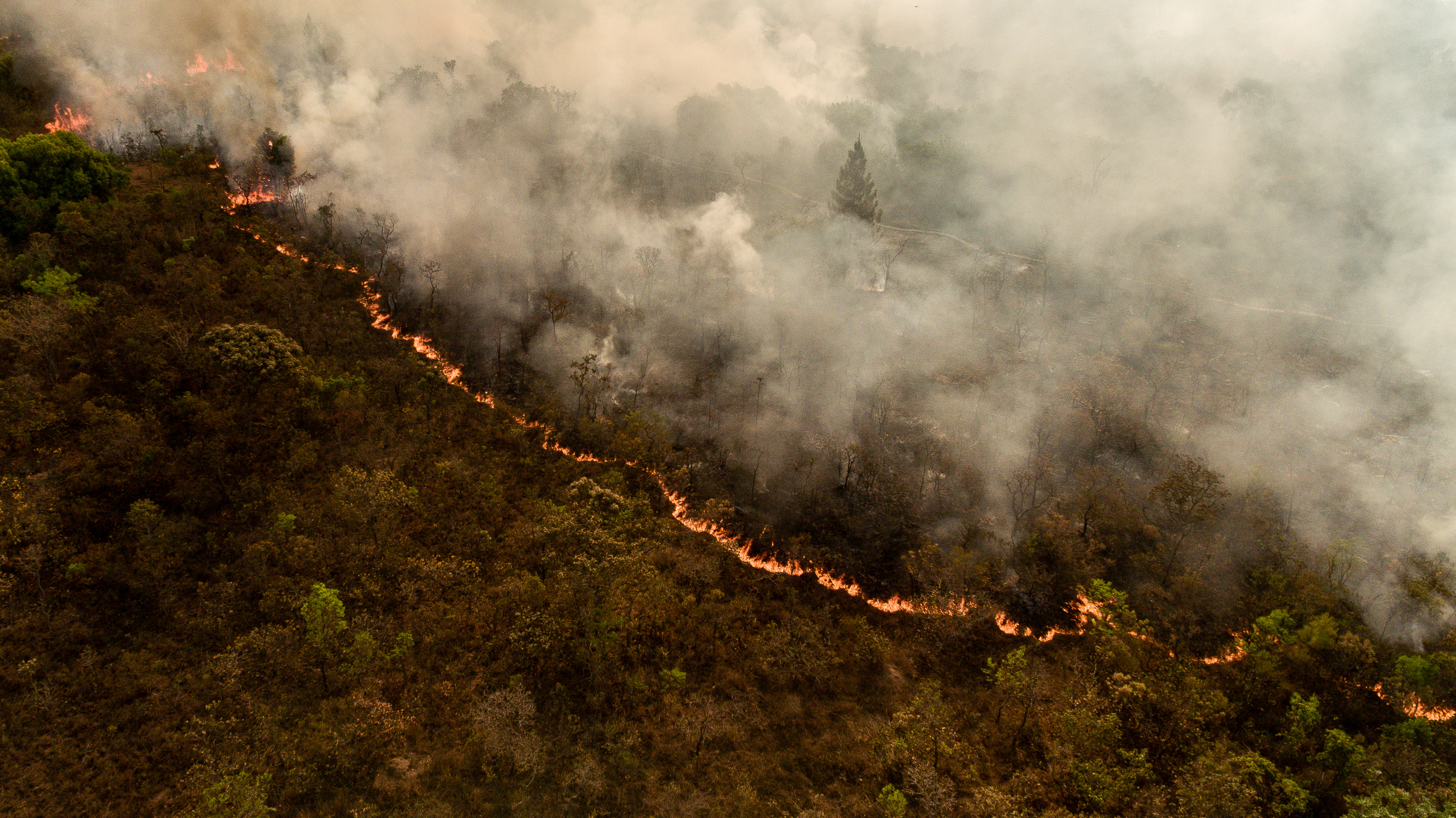
Forest fire in the Brasília National Forest, September 2024

Several criticisms have focused on the governance and effectiveness of climate finance in Brazil. Reports have pointed out that, between 2019 and 2022, the Climate Fund financed virtually no new relevant projects (reserving only R$500,000 in 2021/22,capable of funding one or two small initiatives) and improperly channeling 84% of the limited resources available to a single project (the "Lixão Zero") without public bidding. Internationally, there has been controversy surrounding the Amazon Fund: in 2019, Norway suspended transfers of approximately R$133 million after the Brazilian government unilaterally dissolved the fund's technical committees, alleging a breach of the governance agreement.

For the near future, Brazil has proposed an ambitious resource mobilization agenda. As president of COP30, the country presented a "Baku-Belém Roadmap" in 2025, aiming to raise US$1.3 trillion by 2030 to finance the climate transition. This plan emphasizes the need to increase public financing and reform multilateral banks (World Bank, IMF) to increase lending capacity, as well as expand concessional lines focused on adaptation and compensation for climate losses and damages. Also discussed are the creation of national hubs and platforms that connect Brazilian projects with international investors, and the adoption of financial regulations (carbon pricing, Central Bank climate supervision) to attract private capital.

At COP28, Brazil presented a new fund proposal, the Tropical Forests Forever Facility (TFFF). The project, which provides for US$125 billion in financing, is expected to be launched at COP30 in November 2025. Generally speaking, the TFFF would operate based on blended finance, where a smaller portion of the loan is lent by developed countries, which receive it back with interest, and the remainder, about 80%, would come from private investors. Private investors could also profit by receiving a fixed rate of return, similar to Treasury bonds. Excess profits would be directed to countries based on their protected tropical forest areas, with penalties of US$400 for each hectare deforested in a one-year period.

With investments in solutions that reduce the environmental impact of the transportation sector, Brazil could become one of the largest producers of biofuels by 2030. Brazil's prominence in this sector is mainly due to bioethanol, a fuel produced in the country from sugarcane or corn, in smaller quantities.

== See also ==
- Climate change
