= Wildlife of Brazil =

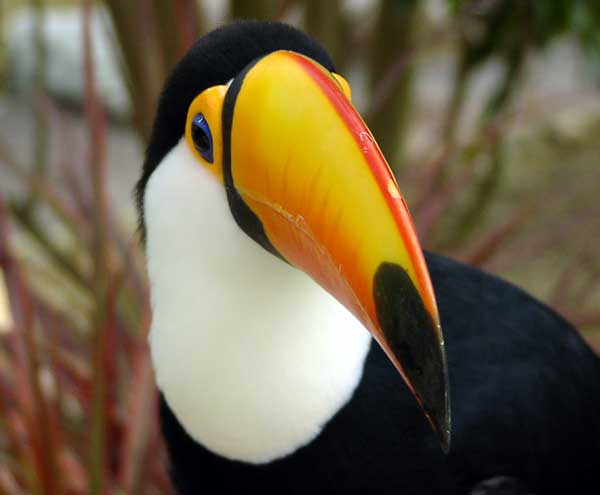
The toco toucan is an animal typical of the Brazilian rainforests.

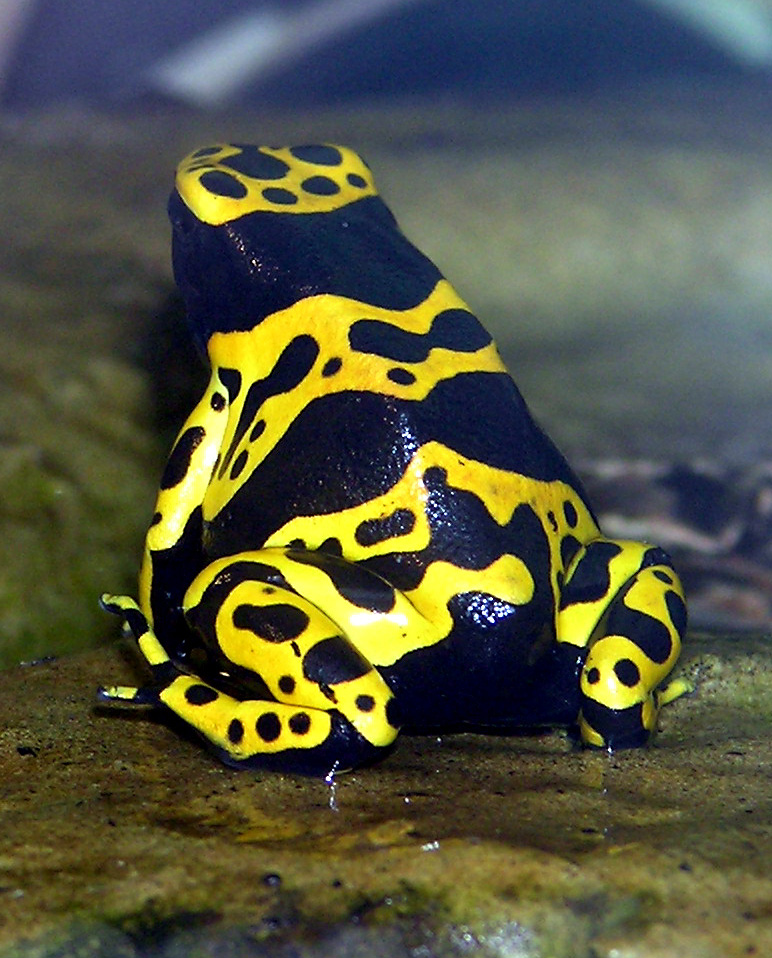
Many varieties of poison dart frogs such as this yellow-banded poison dart frog can be found in the jungles of Brazil.

The wildlife of Brazil comprises all naturally occurring animals, plants, and fungi in Brazil, which is the most biodiverse country in the world. Home to 60% of the Amazon rainforest, which accounts for approximately one-tenth of all species in the world, Brazil has the greatest biodiversity of any country on the planet. It has the most known species of plants (60,000), freshwater fish (3,000), amphibians (1,188), snakes (430), insects (90,000) and mammals (775). Brazil is also the country with the most native species of edible fruits (over 300). It also ranks third on the list of countries with the most bird species (1,971) and the third with the most reptile species (848). The number of fungal species is unknown (+3,300 species). Approximately two-thirds of all species worldwide are found in tropical areas, often coinciding with developing countries such as Brazil. Brazil is second only to Indonesia as the country with the most endemic species.

== Biodiversity ==
In the animal kingdom, there is general consensus that Brazil has the highest number of both terrestrial vertebrates and invertebrates of any country in the world. This high diversity of fauna can be explained in part by the sheer size of Brazil and the great variation in ecosystems such as Amazon rainforest, Atlantic Forest, Cerrado, Pantanal, Pampas and the Caatinga. The numbers published about Brazil's fauna diversity vary from source to source, as taxonomists sometimes disagree about species classifications, and information can be incomplete or out-of-date. Also, new species continue to be discovered and some species go extinct in the wild. Brazil has the highest diversity of primates (131 species) and freshwater fish (over 3150 species) of any country in the world. It also claims the highest number of mammals with 775 species, the third highest number of butterflies with 3,150 species, the third highest number of birds with 1,982 species, and third highest number of reptiles with 848 species. There is a high number of endangered species, many of which live in threatened habitats such as the Atlantic Forest or the Amazon Rainforest.

Scientists have described between 96,660 and 128,843 invertebrate species in Brazil. According to a 2005 estimate by Thomas M. Lewinsohn and Paulo I. Prado, Brazil is home to around 9.5% of all the species and 13.1% of biota found in the world; these figures are likely to be underestimates according to the authors.

Enough is known about Brazilian fungi to say with confidence that the number of native species must be very high and very diverse: in work almost entirely limited to the state of Pernambuco, during the 1950s, 1960s and early 1970s, more than 3300 species were observed by a single group of mycologists. Given that current best estimates suggest only about 7% of the world's true diversity of fungal species has so far been discovered, with most of the known species having been described from temperate regions, the number of fungal species occurring in Brazil is likely to be far higher.

Because it encompasses many species-rich ecosystems for animals, fungi and plants, Brazil houses many thousands of species, with many (if not most) of them still undiscovered. Due to the relatively explosive economic and demographic rise of the country in the last century, Brazil's ability to protect its environmental habitats has increasingly come under threat. Extensive logging in the nation's forests, particularly the Amazon, both official and unofficial, destroys areas the size of a small country each year, and potentially a diverse variety of plants and animals. However, as various species possess special characteristics, or are built in an interesting way, some of their capabilities are being copied for use in technology (see bionics), and the profit potential may result in a retardation of deforestation.

== Ecoregions ==
Brazil's immense area is subdivided into different ecoregions in several kinds of biomes. Because of the wide variety of habitats in Brazil, from the jungles of the Amazon rainforest and the Atlantic Forest (which includes Atlantic Coast restingas), to the tropical savanna of the Cerrado, to the xeric shrubland of the Caatinga, to the world's largest wetland area, the Pantanal, there exists a wide variety of wildlife as well.

== Animals ==
=== Terrestrial mammals and reptiles ===
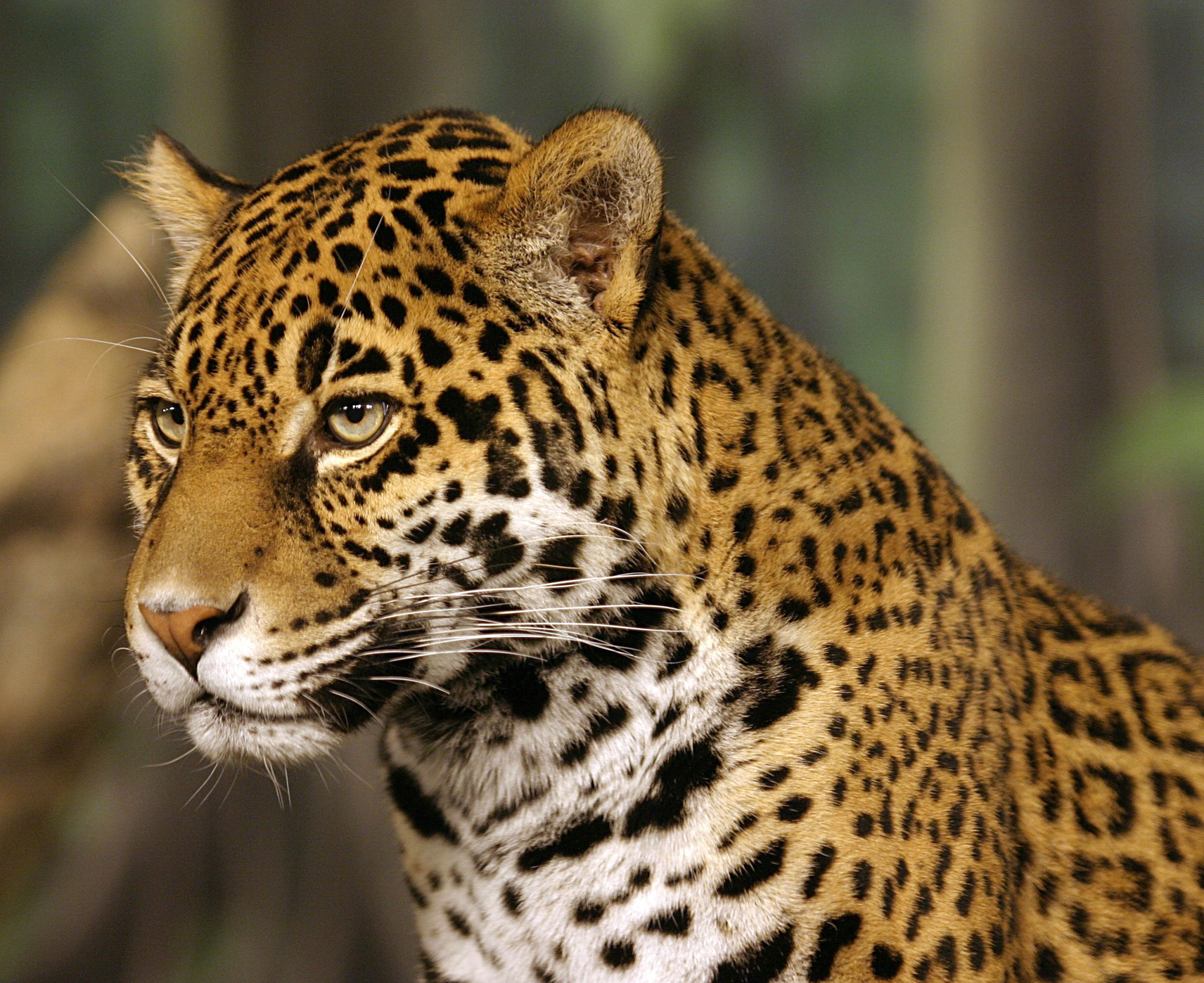
A jaguar

The wild canids found in Brazil are the maned wolf, bush dog, hoary fox, short-eared dog, crab-eating fox and pampas fox. The felines found in Brazil are the jaguar, the puma, the margay, the ocelot, the oncilla, and the jaguarundi. Other notable animals include the giant anteater, several varieties of sloths and armadillos, coati, giant river otter, tapir, peccaries, marsh deer, Pampas deer, and capybara (the world's largest existing rodent). There are around 131 (in 2022) primate species, including the howler monkey, the capuchin monkey, and the squirrel monkey, the marmoset, and the tamarin.

Brazil is home to the anaconda, frequently described, controversially, as the largest snake on the planet. This water boa has been measured up to 30 feet (9.1 m) long, but historical reports note that native peoples and early European explorers claim anacondas from 50 to 100 feet (30 m) long.

=== Invertebrates ===
There are 1107 known species of non-marine molluscs living in the wild in Brazil.

The heaviest spider in the world, the Goliath birdeater (Theraphosa blondi), can be found in some regions of Brazil.

=== Insects ===
It is calculated that Brazil has more insects than any country in the world. It is estimated as having over 70,000 species of insects, with some estimates ranging up to 15 million, with more being discovered almost daily. One 1996 report estimated between 50,000 and 60,000 species of insects and spiders in a single hectare of rainforest. About 520 thysanoptera species belonging to six families in 139 genera are found in Brazil.

A common rhea

=== Birds ===
Brazil ranks third on the list of countries, behind Colombia and Peru, with the most number of distinct bird species, having 1622 identified species, including over 70 species of parrots alone. It has 191 endemic birds. The variety of types of birds is vast as well, and include birds ranging from brightly colored parrots, toucans, and trogons to flamingos, ducks, vultures, hawks, eagles, owls, swans, and hummingbirds. There are also species of penguins that have been found in Brazil.

The largest bird found in Brazil is the rhea, a flightless ratite bird, similar to the emu.

=== Aquatic and amphibian ===
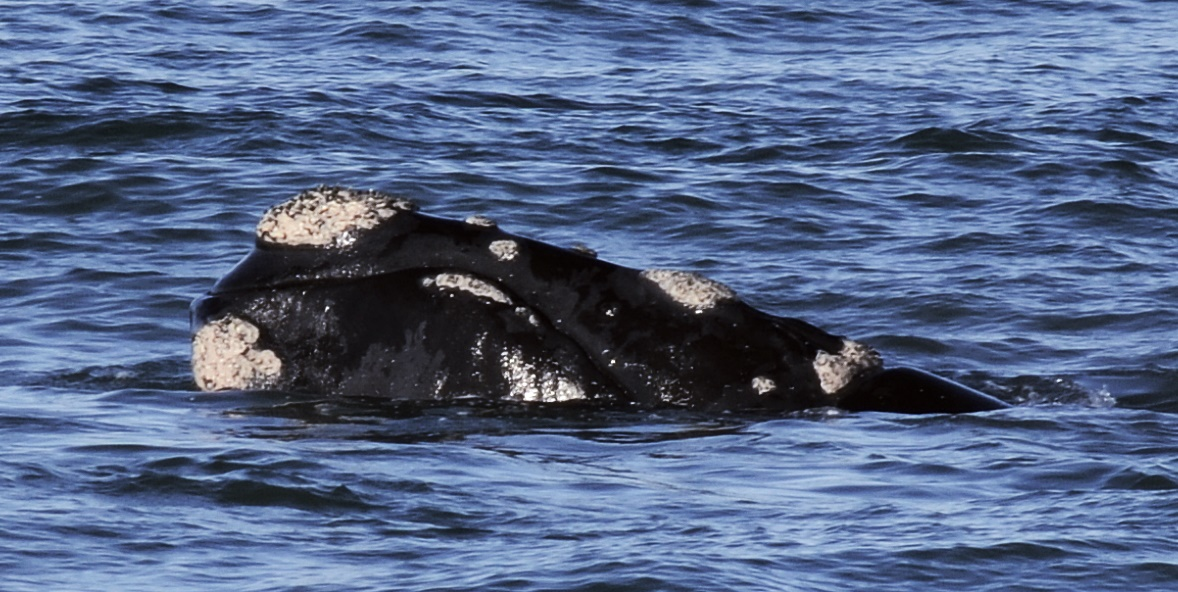
Southern right whale, Florianópolis.

Brazil has over 3,000 identified species of freshwater fish and over 500 species of amphibians. As elsewhere in South America, the majority of the freshwater fish species are characiforms (tetras and allies) and siluriforms (catfish), but there are also many species from other groups such as the cyprinodontiforms and cichlids. While the majority of Brazil's fish species are native to the Amazon, the Paraná–Paraguay and the São Francisco river basins, the country also has an unusually high number of troglobitic fish, with 25 species (15% of the total in the world) known so far. The most well-known fish in Brazil is the piranha.

Other aquatic and amphibian animals found in Brazil include the pink dolphin (the world's largest river dolphin), the caimans (such as the black caiman), and the pirarucu (one of the world's largest river fish). Also familiar are the brightly colored poison dart frogs.

== Fungi ==
The diversity of Brazil's fungi - even the small amount known so far to scientists - is astonishing. Using only conventional microscopy, and examining living leaves collected from various plants, the mycologist Batista and his colleagues, working in Pernambuco in the 1950s, 1960s and 1970s, regularly recorded more than one fungal species, and sometimes up to ten on a single leaf. Although information about fungi worldwide remains very fragmented, a preliminary estimate, based only on the work of Batista, shows that the number of potentially endemic fungal species in Brazil already exceeds 2000. Also, fungi is very often spotted in Brazil.

== Plants ==
Princess flower

Brazil has 55,000 recorded plant species, the highest number of any country. About 30% of these species are endemic to Brazil. The Atlantic Forest region is home to tropical and subtropical moist forests, tropical dry forests, tropical savannas, and mangrove forests. The Pantanal region is a wetland, and home to a known 3,500 species of plants. The Cerrado is biologically the most diverse savanna in the world.

In Brazil forest cover is around 59% of the total land area, equivalent to 496,619,600 hectares (ha) of forest in 2020, down from 588,898,000 hectares (ha) in 1990. In 2020, naturally regenerating forest covered 485,396,000 hectares (ha) and planted forest covered 11,223,600 hectares (ha). Of the naturally regenerating forest 44% was reported to be primary forest (consisting of native tree species with no clearly visible indications of human activity) and around 30% of the forest area was found within protected areas. For the year 2015, 56.% of the forest area was reported to be under public ownership and 44% private ownership.

The pau-brasil tree (also known as brazilwood and the origin of the country's name) was a common plant found along the Atlantic coast of Brazil. But excessive logging of the prized timber and red dye from the bark pushed the pau-brasil towards extinction. However, since the inception of synthetic dyes, the pau-brasil has been harvested less.

All over Brazil, in all biomes, are hundreds of species of orchids, including those in the genera Cattleya, Oncidium, and Laelia.

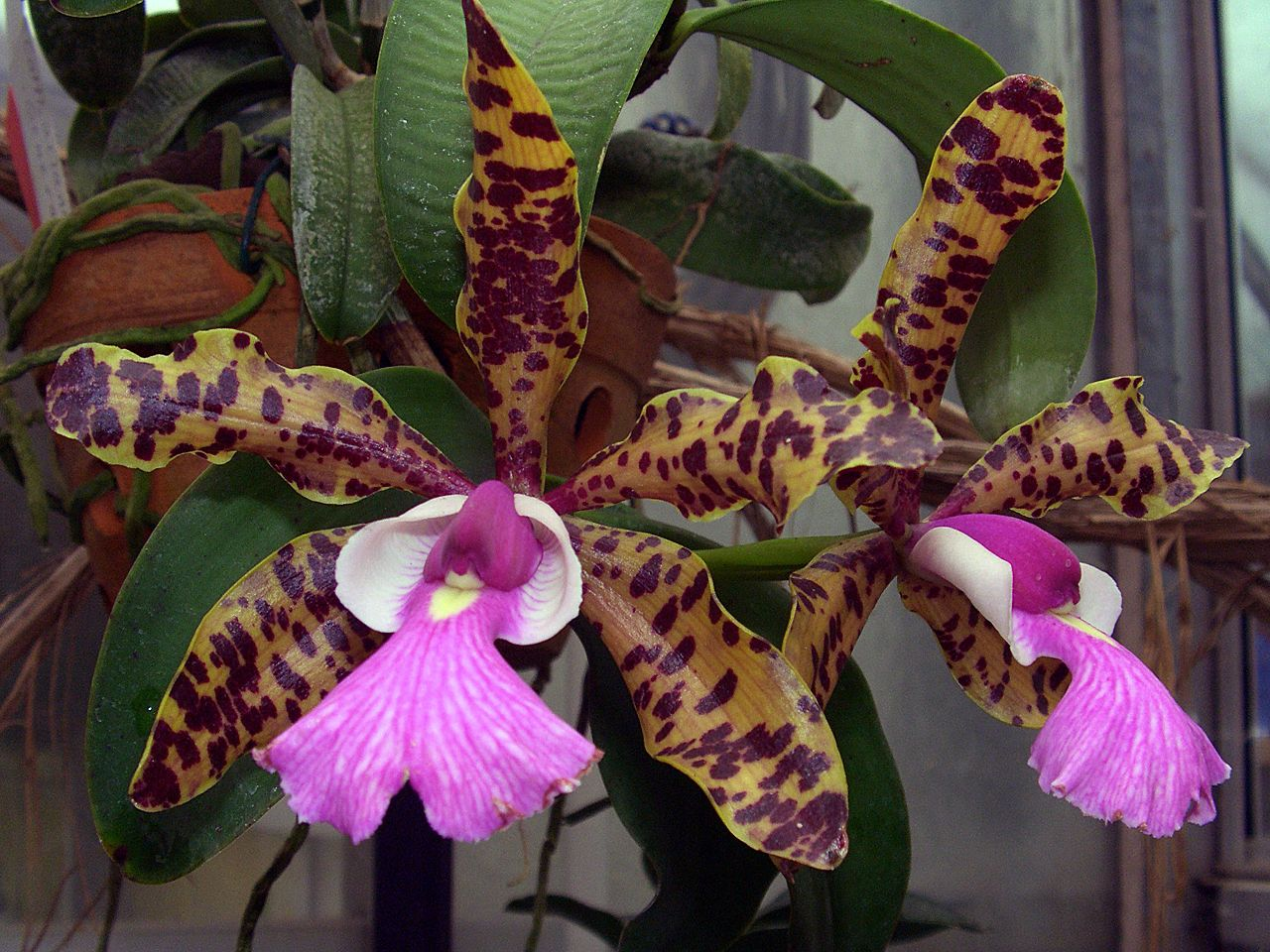
Cattleya aclandiae or Lady Ackland's cattleya

Along the border with Venezuela lies Monte Roraima, home to many carnivorous plants. The plants evolved to digest insects due to the oligotrophic (low level of nutrients) soil of the tepui.

List of plants by ecoregion:

- List of plants of Amazon Rainforest vegetation of Brazil
- List of plants of Atlantic Forest vegetation of Brazil
- List of plants of Caatinga vegetation of Brazil
- List of plants of Cerrado vegetation of Brazil
- List of plants of Pantanal vegetation of Brazil

== Threats to wildlife ==
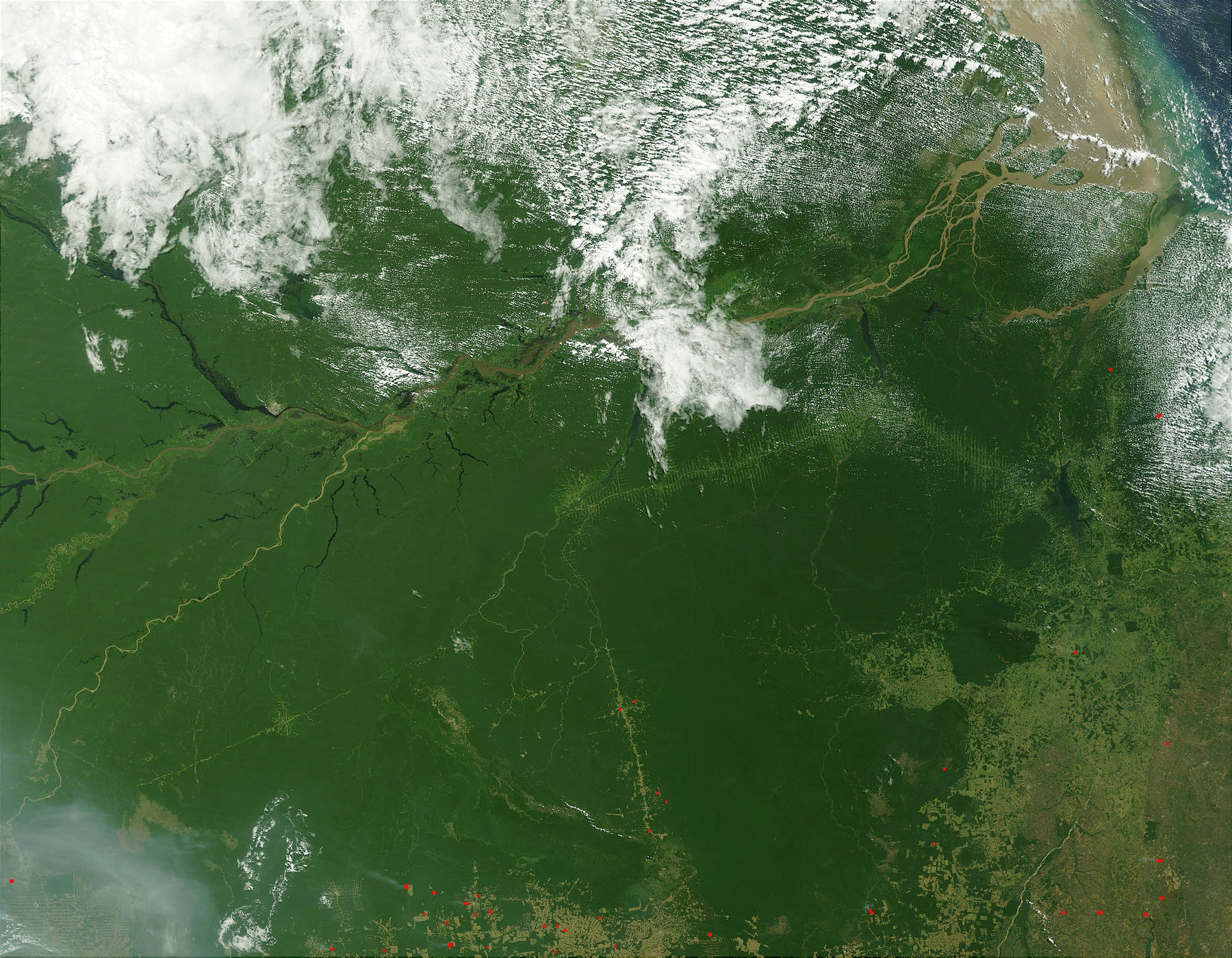
"At bottom right and bottom center, deforestation and cultivation are evident by the regular, rectangular shapes that delineate plots."

More than one-fifth of the Amazon Rainforest in Brazil has been completely destroyed, and more than 70 mammals are endangered. The threat of extinction comes from several sources, including deforestation and poaching. Extinction is even more problematic in the Atlantic Forest, where nearly 93% of the forest has been cleared. Of the 202 endangered animals in Brazil, 171 are in the Atlantic Forest. Currently, 15.8 million acres of tropical ecosystem have been completely eliminated to farm sugarcane for ethanol production. And additional 4.5 million acres is planned to be planted during the next four years. 70-85% of Brazil's transportation energy is derived from ethanol, or various mixtures of ethanol and petroleum-based fuels. Only about 15-20% comes from imported petroleum. This massive national biofuel program has been devastating to tropical wildlife diversity, and to the global climate/environment. Article 1 With its acquisition of BioEnergia, BP (British Petroleum) is planning to further expand Brazil's ethanol program. BP - BioEnergia

== National emblems ==
National bird	Rufous-bellied thrush (sabiá)
National flower	Ipê-amarelo – Tecoma chrysostricha
National tree	Pau-brasil – Caesalpinia echinata

== See also ==
- List of endangered flora of Brazil
- List of lichens of Brazil
- List of ministers of natural environment of Brazil
- Movimento dos Atingidos por Barragens
- Biomes in Brazil
