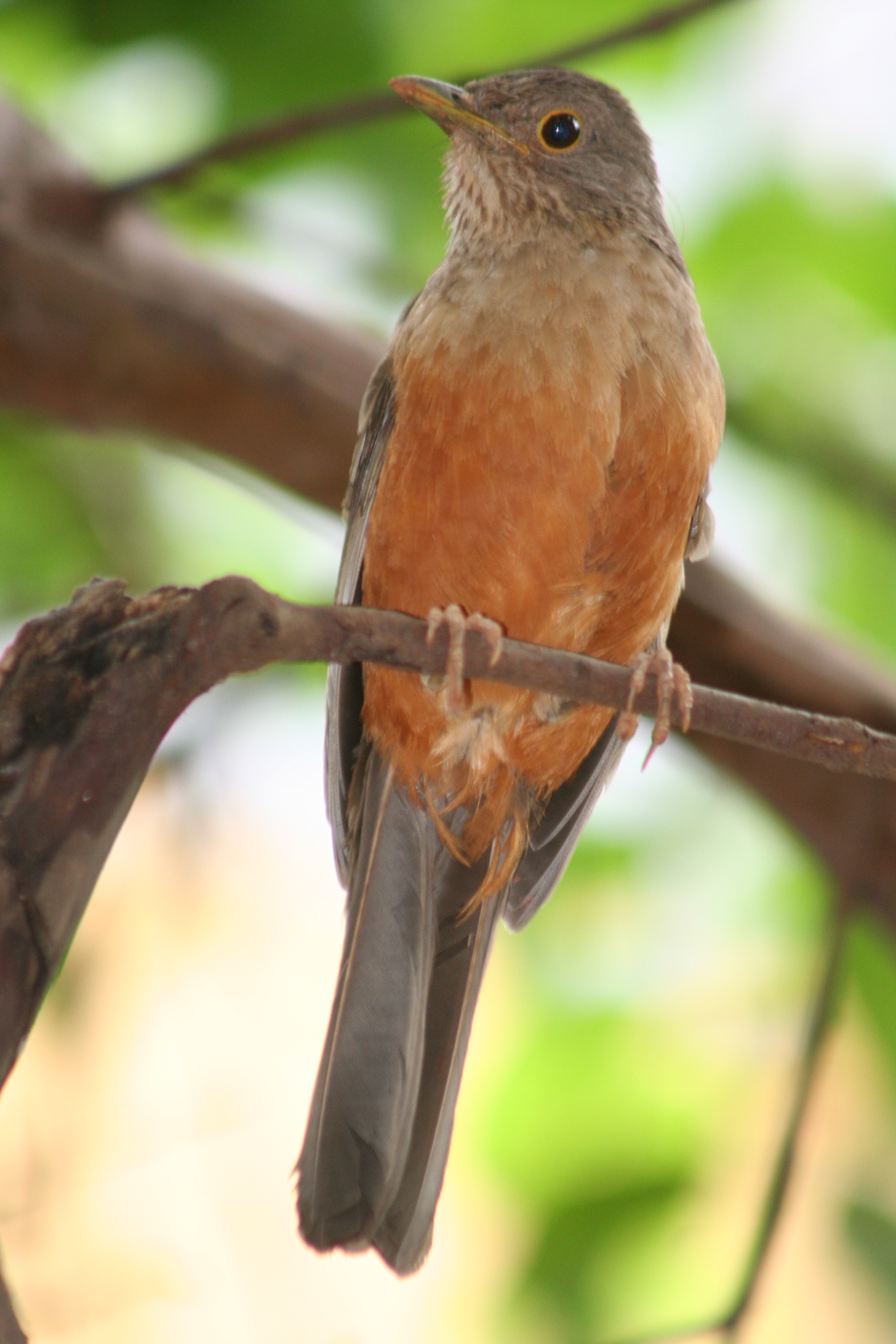

Conservation status
- Least Concern (IUCN 3.1)

Scientific classification
- Kingdom: Animalia
- Phylum: Chordata
- Class: Aves
- Order: Passeriformes
- Family: Turdidae
- Genus: Turdus
- Species: T. rufiventris

Binomial name
- Turdus rufiventris Vieillot, 1818

Audio
- Song recorded in Petrópolis, Brazil

= Rufous-bellied thrush =

Species of bird

The rufous-bellied thrush (Turdus rufiventris) is a songbird of the thrush family (Turdidae). Its distribution covers most of eastern and southeastern Brazil from the states of Maranhão south to Rio Grande do Sul, Bolivia, Paraguay, Uruguay, and central regions of Argentina.

It is one of the most common birds across much of southeastern Brazil, and is known there under the name sabiá-laranjeira (Portuguese pronunciation: [sabiˈa laɾɐ̃ˈʒejɾɐ]). It was famously referred to in the well-known first strophe of the Brazilian nationalist poem Canção do Exílio. The rufous-bellied thrush has been the state bird of São Paulo since 1966, and the national bird of Brazil since 2002. It is highly regarded in Brazil, where its song is often heard in the afternoons, but specially during the nights between August and November, where thousands of them sing until the sunrise, and is often seen as "the spirit of the Brazilian commoner".

== Description ==
This species is named after its distinctive reddish-orange underparts. Rufous-bellied thrushes can reach a length of 25 cm and weigh up to 68 g (male) or 78 g (female), though weights of about 59 g for males and 64 g for females are more usual. Contrary to what one might expect from the rather marked weight difference, the females are not larger, only plumper; their tarsus is actually a bit shorter than that of males on average.

== Habits ==
Found in forests and urban wooded areas, it is an omnivorous bird. Its food consists mainly of fruits and arthropods, and it can sometimes be seen attending mixed-species feeding flocks and moving through the bushes with many other birds. It has been observed to squabble with a common marmoset (Callithrix jacchus) in the undergrowth over food flushed by an army ant column, but this was during the dry season when fruits are scarce.

== Nesting ==
It builds an open-cup nest, sometimes right on the forest floor, sometimes more than 20 meters high in a tree, but usually 4–5 meters above ground. In the yungas of NW Argentina, nesting occurred in the wet season from October to March, with most birds breeding in November–December. The three, sometimes two eggs measure about 27-28 by 20 mm, and weigh c.5.7-5.9 grams each. They are incubated for about 12–13 days, and young take about that long again until they fledge. Incubation is solely by the female, which spends considerable time on the nest. The nestlings are attended by both parents however; as the young near fledging, they are fed every 5–7 minutes or so on average. Predation may be a major cause of brood failure; in the southern Andean yungas it was noted to be especially high during the nestling time and far less significant during incubation.

== Status ==
This common and wide-ranging species is not considered threatened by the IUCN.

== Gallery ==
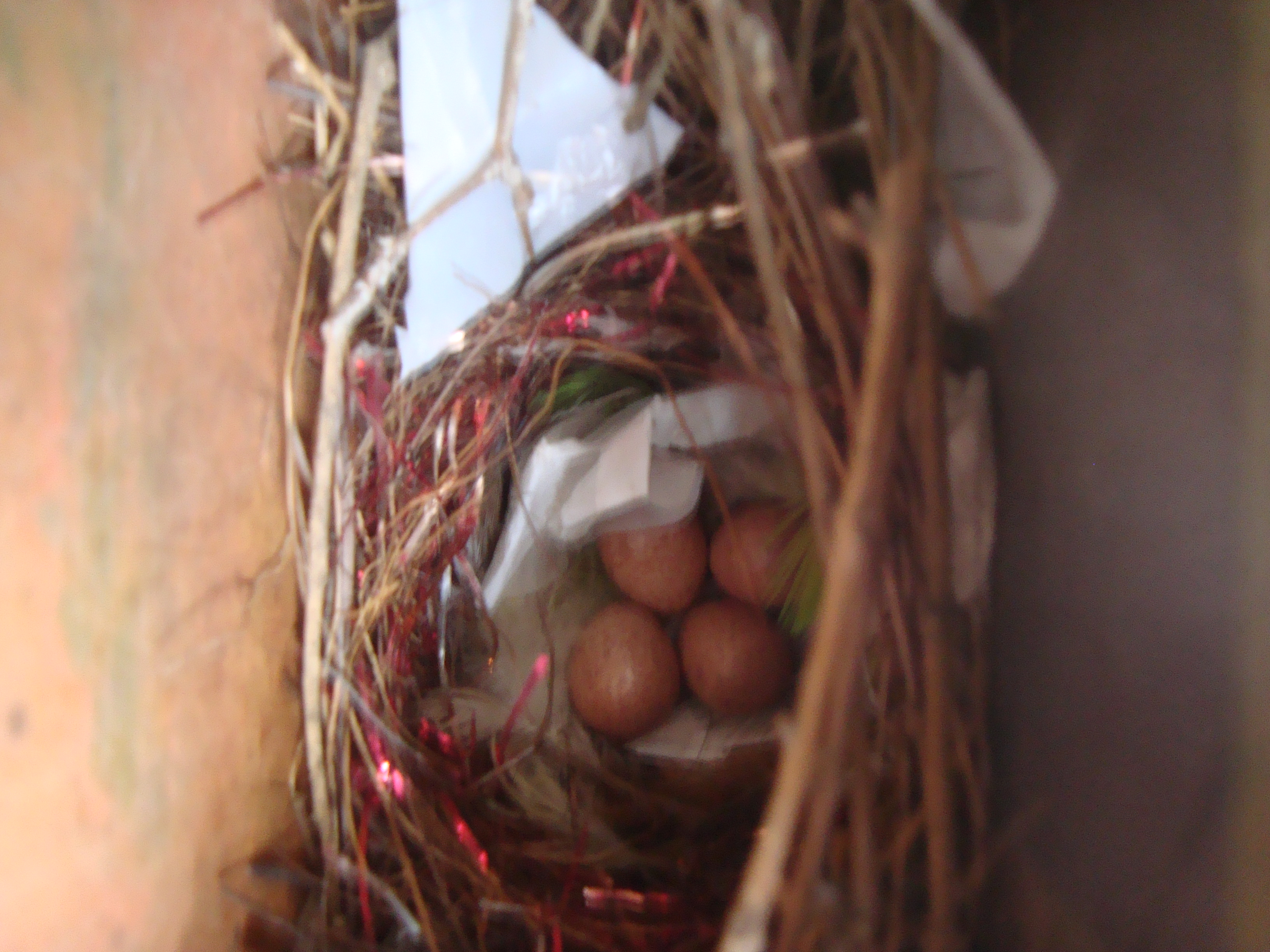
Bird's nest in a mailbox, located in a residence of the Northern Zone of São Paulo, Brazil; note the use of plastic bags, twigs, and feathers in its construction

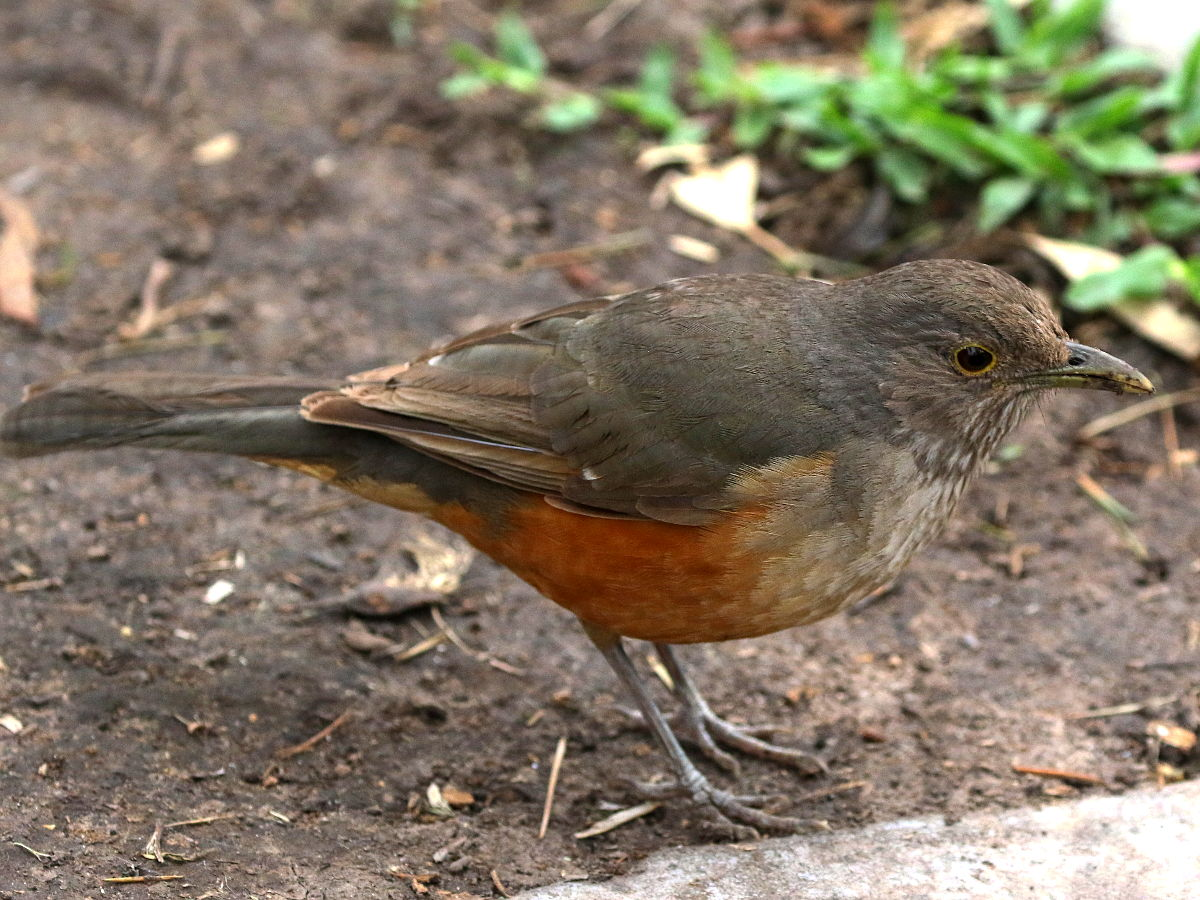
Note rufous belly. Costanera Sur Ecological Reserve, Argentina

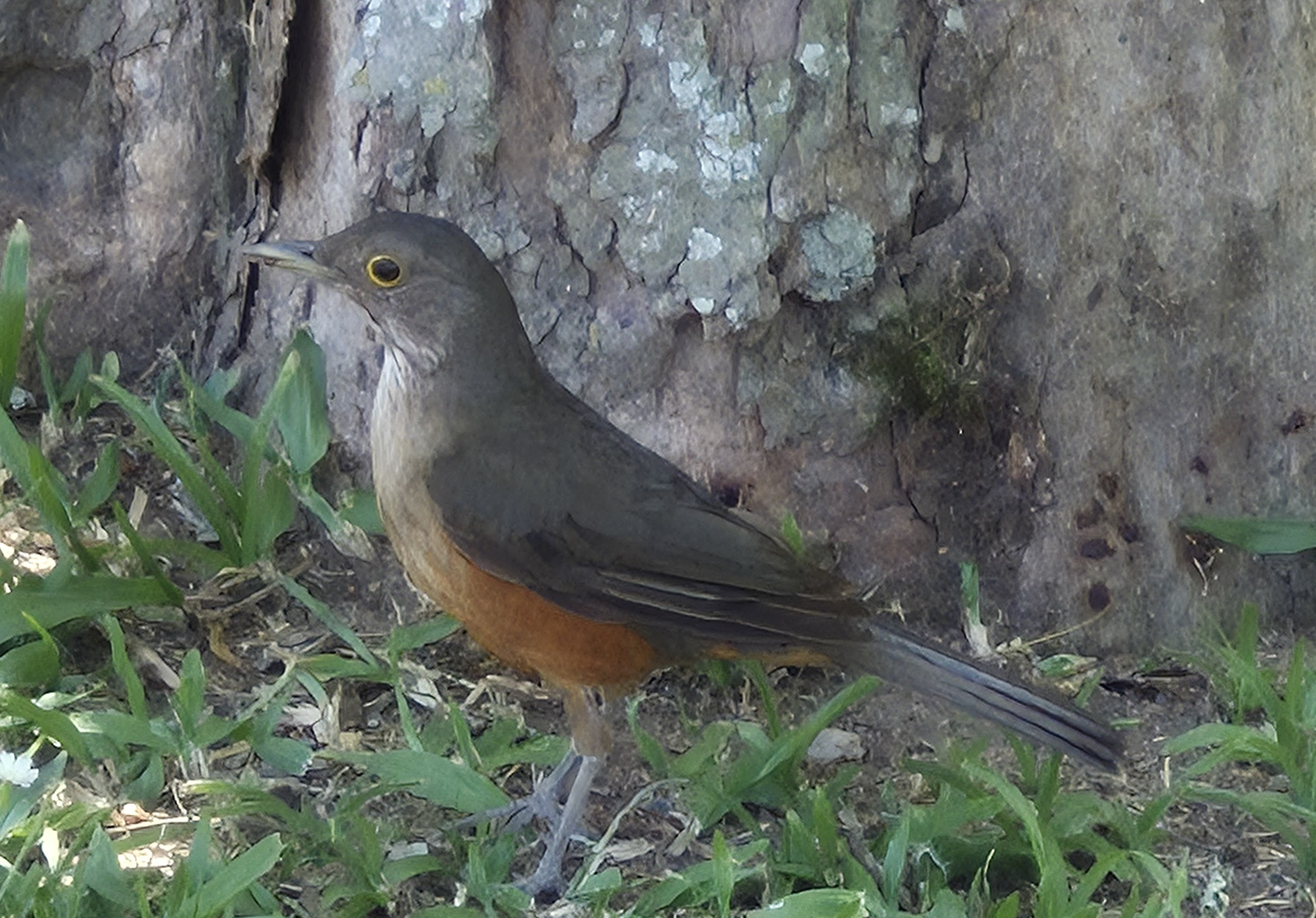
In Brazil

== See also ==
- List of birds of Brazil
- Wildlife of Brazil
