= Amazon Fund =

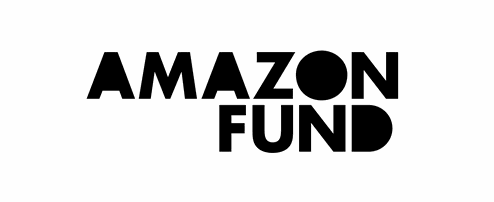
- Formation: 2008; 18 years ago
- Type: Non-refundable investment fund
- Legal status: Active
- Headquarters: Brazil
- Region served: South America
- Website: www.amazonfund.gov.br

The Amazon Fund (in Portuguese: Fundo Amazônia) is an initiative created by Brazil and managed by the National Bank for Economic and Social Development (BNDES). It was established on 1 August 2008, with the aim of attracting donations for non-reimbursable investments in actions for the prevention, monitoring, and combat of deforestation, and for the promotion of conservation and sustainable use of the Amazon rainforest. Additionally, the fund supports the development of monitoring and control systems for deforestation in the rest of Brazil and in other tropical countries.

The fund is used in various areas, including the management of public forests and protected areas, control, monitoring and environmental enforcement, sustainable forest management, economic activities developed from the sustainable use of the forest, ecological and economic zoning, land planning and regularization, conservation and sustainable use of biodiversity, and the recovery of deforested areas. The projects supported by the fund must be aligned with applicable public policies and the guidelines and criteria, in addition to demonstrating their direct or indirect contribution to the reduction of deforestation and forest degradation. The actions foreseen in the projects must be coherent with the proposed objective, with the budget and with the schedule of its implementation. Eligibility for accessing the Amazon Fund is determined based on compliance with several plans and criteria, including the PPCDAm (Action Plan for Prevention and Control of Deforestation in the Legal Amazon Region), ENREDD+ (National Strategy for REDD+), state plans for preventing and combating deforestation, and BNDES Operational Policies. Projects eligible for funding should directly or indirectly contribute to reducing deforestation in the Amazon. Various types of entities can submit projects for funding, including public administration bodies, NGOs, private companies, cooperatives, and research institutions.

Until 2018, the fund received R$ 3.4 billion in donations, with the majority coming from Norway, followed by Germany and Petrobras. Since 2023, several countries announced contributions to the fund or interest in contributing, including Germany, Norway, the United Kingdom, Switzerland, Denmark, France, Spain, Japan and others.

== Overview ==
The Amazon Fund, established in 2008 and operational since 2009, was primarily created to incentivize Brazil and other developing countries with tropical rainforests to reduce greenhouse gas emissions and forest degradation. The initiative was proposed by Brazil during the 12th Conference of the Parties of the United Nations Framework Convention on Climate Change (UNFCCC) in Nairobi, Kenya, in 2008. The fund's establishment followed Brazil's commitment to significantly reduce deforestation in the Amazon biome over the next decade.

Since its creation, the Fund has supported more than 100 projects related to the management of public forests and protected areas, environmental control, monitoring and inspection, sustainable forest management, economic activities created with sustainable use of vegetation, ecological and economic zoning, arrangement territorial and agricultural regulation, preservation and sustainability, exploitation of biodiversity and recovery of deforested areas.

In 2019, during the Bolsonaro government, the then Environment Minister Ricardo Salles proposed alterations to the structure of the Amazon Fund, citing irregularities in its management. He suggested that the fund's resources should be used to compensate for land expropriations in conservation areas within the Amazon rainforest. Third sector institutions, along with Germany and Norway, opposed these changes. They argued that audits had not identified any irregularities in the fund's management or in the monitoring of deforestation impacts. They stated that 'enhancing the fund's efficiency, impact, and transparency' should be pursued 'within the existing governance framework'.

Also in 2019, German Environment Minister Svenja Schulze announced that, due to the increased deforestation in the Amazon region and concerns about the Jair Bolsonaro government, Germany would suspend investments of R$155 million in the Amazon Fund. On the 15th of August 2019, Norway decided to suspend disbursements of R$ 133 million to the Amazon Fund.

The suspensions were criticized by President Jair Bolsonaro, who reacted dismissively—accusing Norway of hypocrisy due to its whale hunting and offshore oil exploration and exportation. He suggested that Norway should use its funds to help Angela Merkel reforest Germany, and stated that Norway had “nothing to teach” the country when it comes to environmental protection. In response, both Norway and Germany defended their decisions, citing Brazil’s rising deforestation rates and lack of commitment to preserving the Amazon under Bolsonaro government. Norwegian officials emphasized that their funding was conditional on measurable environmental results, while Germany reaffirmed its support for environmental cooperation but stressed the need for credible action from Brazil.

In late 2022, with the election of Lula, Norway and Germany announced that they were willing to resume financing of the Amazon Fund. In 2023, several countries announced contributions to the fund or interest in contributing, including Germany, Norway, the United Kingdom, Switzerland, Denmark, France, Spain and others.

In 2024, the NBESD reached the mark of R$ 882 million in approvals of Amazon Fund projects, the amount is higher than the previous record, reached in 2023, of R$ 553 million.

== Governance ==
The Amazon Fund has a Guidance Committee (COFA), responsible for setting guidelines and monitoring the results achieved, and a Technical Committee (CTFA), which is tasked with certifying the calculations made by the Ministry of the Environment and Climate Change (MMA) regarding the actual reductions in carbon emissions from deforestation.

=== Guidance Committee ===
The Amazon Fund Guidance Committee (COFA) is responsible for setting the guidelines and criteria for the Amazon Fund, both within and outside the Legal Amazon Region. It monitors information on the application of its resources and approves the Activity Report. COFA also ensures that the initiatives supported by the Amazon Fund align with those outlined in the PPCDAm and ENREDD+.

The Guidance Committee is composed of representatives from the government and civil society, including federal government agencies, the states of the Brazilian Legal Amazon (Acre, Amapá, Amazonas, Maranhão, Mato Grosso, Pará, Rondônia, Roraima and Tocantins), and representatives from civil society.

=== Technical Committee ===
The Technical Committee of the Amazon Fund (CTFA) is tasked with validating carbon emissions from deforestation as calculated by the Ministry of the Environment and Climate Change (MMA). It evaluates the methodology used to calculate the deforested area and the carbon per hectare applied in the emission estimates. CTFA meetings are held annually and, when necessary, on an extraordinary basis.

The CTFA comprises renowned technical and scientific specialists appointed by the MMA after consultation with the Brazilian Forum on Climate Change. Participation in the CTFA is for a term of three years, renewable once, and is considered a public service, with no remuneration provided.

== Efforts and policies ==
Deforestation rates in Brazil since 1988, highlighted by government periods

Brazil's efforts to reduce deforestation in the Amazon rainforest have been recognised worldwide. Brazil’s pioneering technological efforts in monitoring changes in land use have been conducted by the Brazilian National Institute for Space Research (INPE) since 1988. Furthermore, the country has been acknowledged for recent successes in reversing the increase in annual deforestation rates.

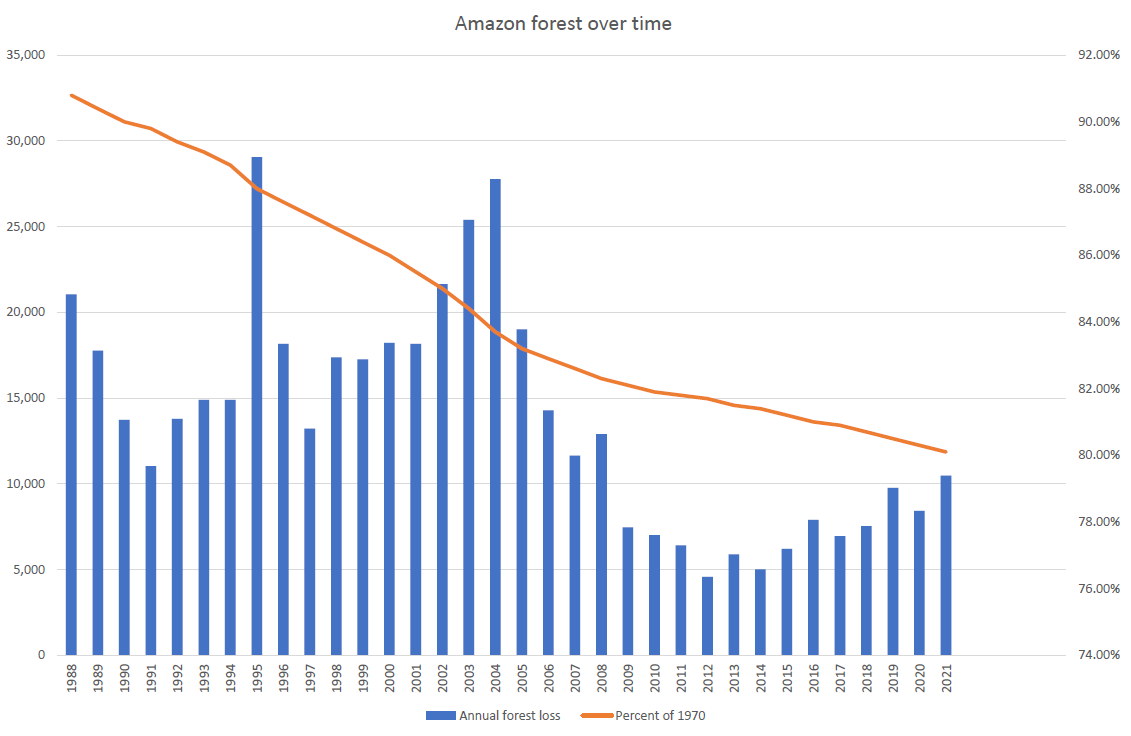
Annual forest loss rates in the Amazon forest since 1988

The Action Plan for the Prevention and Control of Deforestation in the Legal Amazon (PPCDAm) initially comprised 13 ministries of the Brazilian federal government, under the direct coordination of the President's Chief of Staff. Established in 2004, it is a governmental initiative that has significantly contributed to reducing deforestation rates, achieving, for instance, a 59% reduction in the rate over the 2005-2007 period, despite the continued growth in agricultural production in Brazil's North region.

There are also other examples of efforts aimed at discouraging illegal deforestation in the Amazon Rainforest, such as the implementation of frameworks for the management of public forests, which were incorporated into Brazil’s legal system in 2006. In addition, the Brazilian government plans to invest approximately US$ 500 million in initiatives related to the PPCDAm during the 2008-2011 period, as part of its Pluriannual Plan (PPA).

To promote a continuous and consistent reduction in deforestation, the PPCDAm has been updated for the 2012–2015 and 2016–2020 periods. Nonetheless, there is still significant progress to be made in making the remaining forest more economically and socially attractive than clearing it for cattle-raising and agricultural purposes. The more deforestation rates are reduced, the more expensive further reductions become. Therefore, it is increasingly vital to establish a development model for the Amazon rainforest that values and protects its resources while simultaneously fostering social and ethnic diversity and improving the population’s standard of living. Achieving these new goals will require more sophisticated efforts from federal, state, and municipal governments, as well as from Brazilian society.

== Donations ==
Fundraising for the Amazon Fund is tied to the reduction of greenhouse gas emissions from deforestation, meaning it is conditional upon the reduction of the annual deforestation rate. Based on emission reduction data calculated by the Ministry of the Environment and verified by the Technical Committee of the Amazon Fund (CTFA), BNDES is authorised to solicit donations for the Amazon Fund and issue certificates recognising donors' contributions to the Fund.

=== Resources ===
The resources allocated to the fund can be contracted donations, referring to signed contracts that may or may not have been internalised by the Amazon Fund/BNDES; and internalised donations, representing funds already internalised in Brazilian reais (BRL) by the Amazon Fund/BNDES.

Contracted donations
Donor	Amount (original currency)
Norway	NOK 8,269,496,000 + USD 50,000,000
Germany	EUR 89,920,000
United States	USD 53,472,000
Switzerland	CHF 5,000,000
Japan	JPY 411,000,000
United Kingdom	GBP 80,000,000
Denmark	DKK 150,000,000
Ireland	EUR 5,000,000
European Union	EUR 18,600,000
	BRL 17,285,079.13

Internalised donations
Donor	Amount in Brazilian Reais (BRL)
Norway	3,469,251,818.36
Germany	387,859,396.00
United States	291,382,003.20
Switzerland	28,130,000.00
Japan	14,943,000.00
United Kingdom	283,960,570.49
Denmark	43,445,177.83
Ireland	31,529,500
European Union	30,510,045
	17,285,079.13
Total: 4,567,786,545.01

=== Audits ===
The Amazon Fund undergoes two auditing processes annually.

The first process is a financial audit, which takes place as part of the external audit of the BNDES' own financial statements. The financial audit assesses the accuracy of the balances recorded in the Financial Statements of the Amazon Fund, as well as the appropriateness of the allocation of these balances within the BNDES' Financial Statements. The contracts with beneficiaries and the funds disbursed to the supported projects are reviewed, as are the expenses incurred in the management of the Fund.

The second process is a compliance audit. This audit, conducted by an independent external audit firm, involves the application of limited assurance procedures to evaluate BNDES' compliance with the provisions of Decree No. 6,527/2008 regarding supportable actions, the guidelines and criteria issued by the Amazon Fund Guidance Committee (COFA), and, where applicable, the strategic guidelines of the Sustainable Amazon Plan (PAS). It also assesses alignment with the tactical and operational guidelines of the Action Plan for Prevention and Control of Legal Amazon Deforestation (PPCDAm) and the National Strategy for Reduction of Greenhouse Gas Emissions from Deforestation and Forest Degradation, Conservation of Forest Carbon Stocks, Sustainable Management of Forests, and Enhancement of Forest Carbon Stocks (ENREDD+). This process does not include an evaluation of the compliance by project beneficiaries with the obligations agreed upon with BNDES.

== See also ==
- Agriculture in Brazil
- Deforestation of the Amazon Rainforest
- Environment of Brazil
- Environmental issues in Brazil
- Environmental history of Latin America
- Rainforest Alliance
