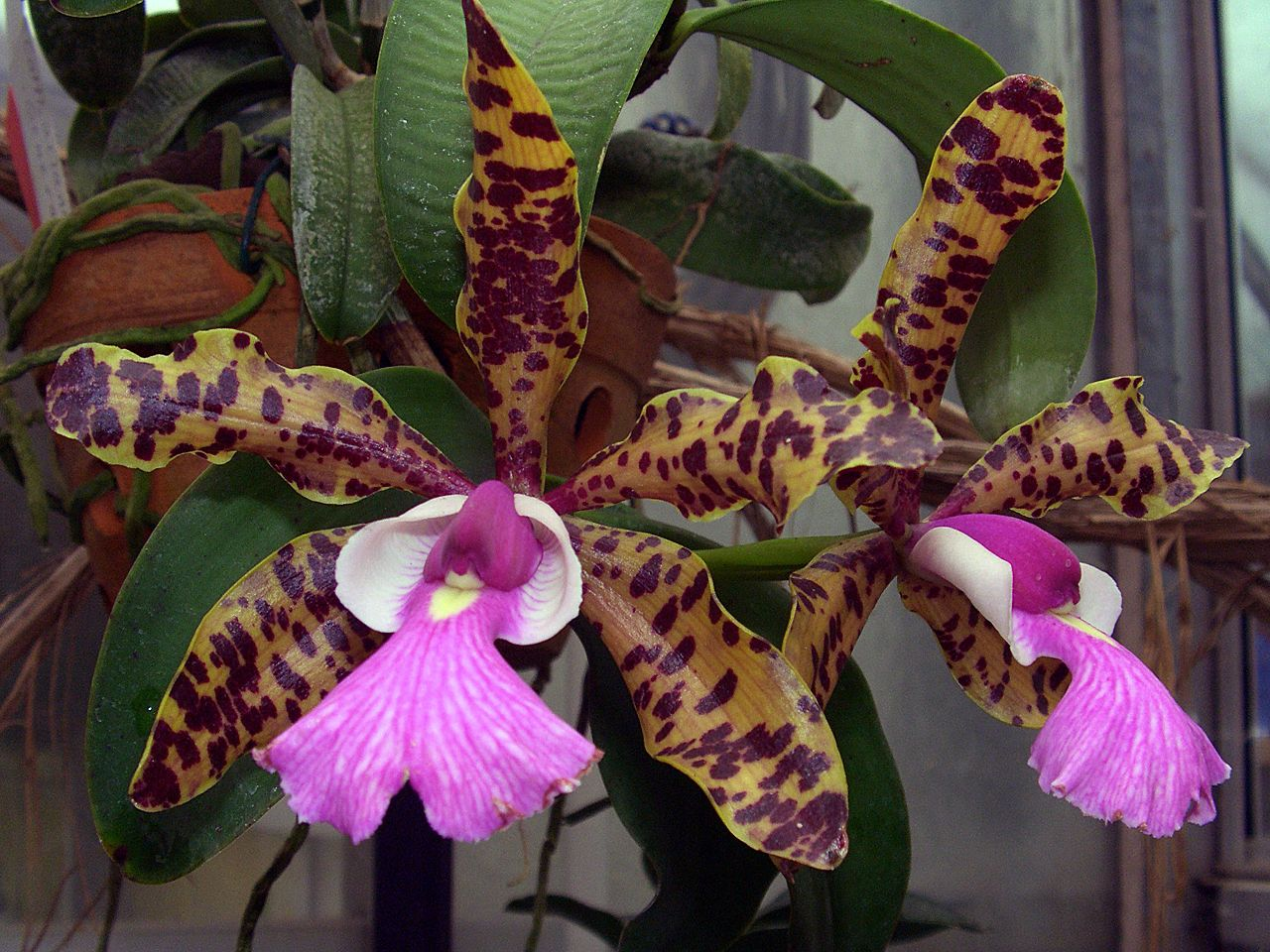

Scientific classification
- Kingdom: Plantae
- Clade: Tracheophytes
- Clade: Angiosperms
- Clade: Monocots
- Order: Asparagales
- Family: Orchidaceae
- Subfamily: Epidendroideae
- Genus: Cattleya
- Subgenus: Cattleya subg. Intermediae
- Species: C. aclandiae

Binomial name
- Cattleya aclandiae Lindl.

Synonyms
- Cattleya aucklandiae; Cattleya auclandii; Epidendrum acklandiae; Epidendrum aclandiae

= Cattleya aclandiae =

Species of orchid

Cattleya aclandiae, or Lady Ackland's cattleya, is a species of orchid from the genus Cattleya, named in honor of Lady Lydia Elizabeth Ackland, wife of Sir Thomas Dyke Acland, 10th Baronet who was the first European to grow the plant successfully. The illustration of the plant which accompanied its first description was based on a drawing by Lady Ackland. The genus was named in honour of William Cattley, a prominent British merchant and horticulturist.

== Distribution ==
Cattleya aclandiae is found growing on tree limbs and trunks in the Brazilian state of Bahia. It has a very small natural range and is found growing in the wind southwest of Salvador on elevated plateaus that border the drainage of the Paraguaçu River. Its native habitat is seasonally dry forests between 100 and 400 meters in elevation near permanent bodies of water.

== Description ==
Cattleya aclandiae is compact and only grows 3–5 in (7.6–12.7 cm) tall. The upright, short, cylindrical pseudobulbs have two fleshy leaves at the apex. Sometimes, purple blotches are found on the leaves when the plants are exposed to intense sunlight. Each growth produces between one and three 2.5 to 4 inches (6.4 to 10.2 centimetres) and the flowers are large for the size of the plant. Flowers are substantial, waxy, and long-lived. Flower color is white or near-white with purple blotches and spots. The lip has a dark purple blotch and the anther cap is yellow. Flowers bloom in the spring and summer on new growths.

== Cultivation ==
Cattleya aclandiae has been widely used by orchid breeders to produce compact hybrids. When crossed with other bifoliate cattleyas, the spotted pattern is present in the offspring. Hybrids of this species generally produce plants that flower two or more times per year.

Several color varieties of C. aclandiae are known. A coerulea form is available in the orchid trade. The 'Rubra' varieties exhibit intensely deep rose lips with very large dark spots on petals and sepals, these spots often coalescing to appear almost solid deep chocolate brown. The 'alba' varieties have petals and sepals of clear lime green with snow white lips. 'Albescen' varieties have sepals and petals of light green with very pastel spots and white lips with little or no color. The more common forms of c. aclandiae have sepal and petal background colors that range from clear green with dark spots to quite yellow with dark spots. The spotting pattern may be bold, almost solid in some clones to more 'peppered', with lips ranging from light rose to deep rose-purple.

In cultivation, C. aclandiae prefers intermediate to warm orchid growing temperatures. Ample water is needed during periods of active growth; less water during the winter. High humidity is appreciated as long as adequate air circulation is present. Grow on cork bark or tree fern mounts or in pots with a coarse, free-draining growing media (fir bark or equivalent).
