= Biomes in Brazil =

A map of the distribution of biomes in Brazil: Amazon rainforest (Tropical) Cerrado (Savanna) Atlantic forest (Tropical) Caatinga (Desert) Pampas (Grassland) Pantanal (Flooded savanna) Marine ecosystem

According to IBGE (2004), Brazil has its territory occupied by six terrestrial biomes and one marine biome.

== Terminology ==
The term "biome" has several meanings. In a narrow sense (e.g., Whittaker, 1975; Coutinho, 2006), used in literature, it names physio-functionally defined small-scale areas, habitat types or ecosystem types. Although it includes both the plants and the animals and microorganisms of a community, in practice, it is defined by the climate and physiognomy or general appearance of the plants of the community.

In the broad sense, adopted by Joly et al. (1978) and the IBGE (2016), biome can be understood as a synonym of "biogeographic province" (e.g., Rizzini, 1963, Eiten 1977, Cabrera and Willink 1980, the term "floristic province" or "phytogeographic" is used when considering plant species only), or as an approximate synonym of "morphoclimatic and phytogeographical domain" (Ab'Sáber, 1967, 2003).

In this broad sense, the "Projeto Radam" (Veloso et al., 1973) applies the term "phytoecological region", and IBGE (2012) adopts the term "floristic region". However, the term "region" must be understood, in this case, in the generalist sense of "area". The terms "region" and "province" have specific traditional meanings in phytogeography: regions are areas characterized by endemic families, and provinces are areas characterized by endemic genera and species.

In the case of the 'domains' of Ab'Sáber (1967, 2003), the defined area is characterized by the predominance of certain geomorphological and climatic characteristics, and also by a certain predominant floristic province (vegetative type). However, there is no uniformity: enclaves from other provinces, characteristics of other domains, may occur within this area.

== Terrestrial biomes ==
=== Amazônia ===
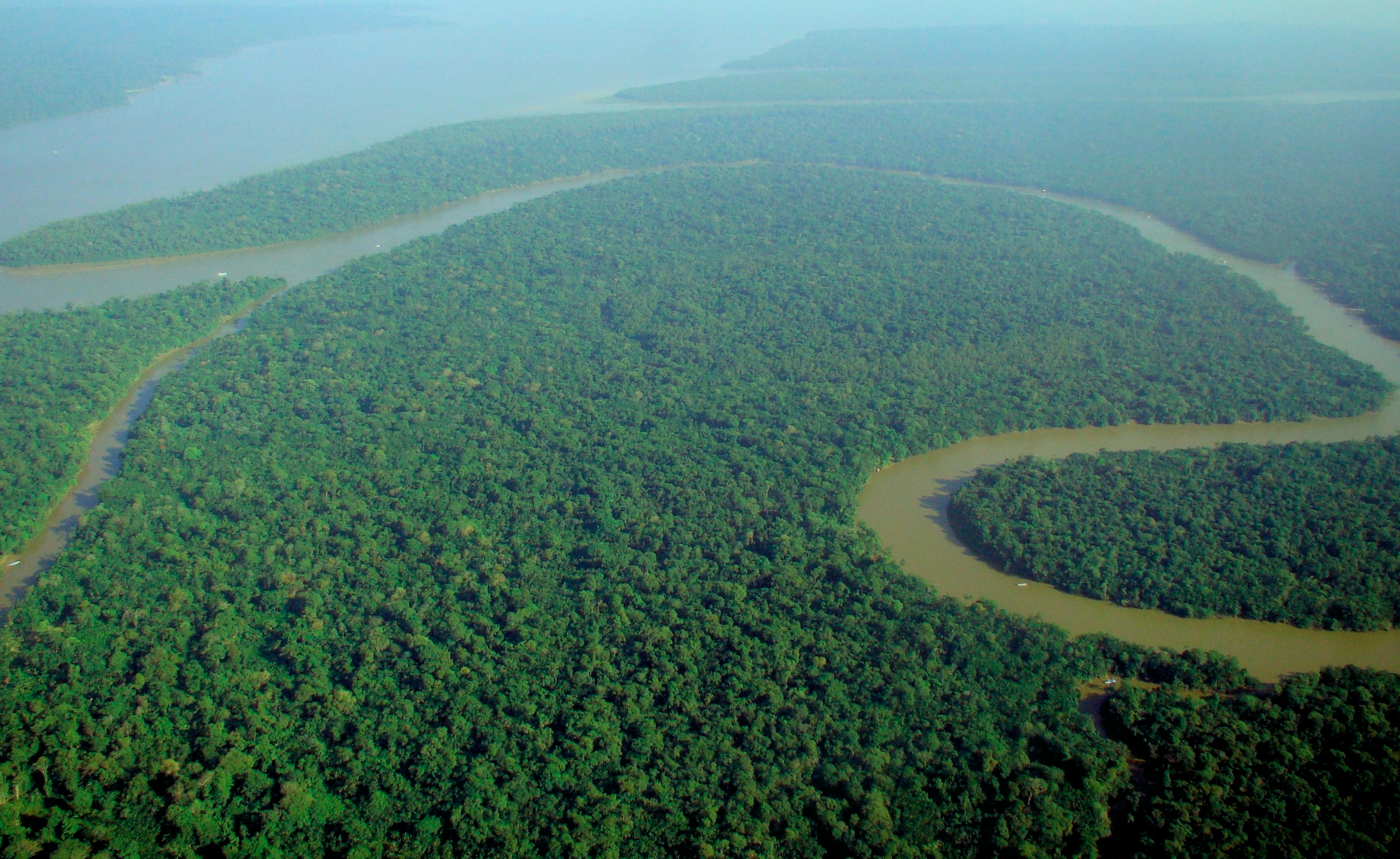
The Amazônia.

The Amazon Forest is the largest forest formation on the planet, conditioned by the humid equatorial climate. It is equivalent to 35% of the forest areas of the planet. It has a wide variety of plant formations. Most of Brazil is covered by the Amazon's forest areas and this number is around 60% and within that there is about 55,000 different species of plants populating it.

=== Cerrado ===
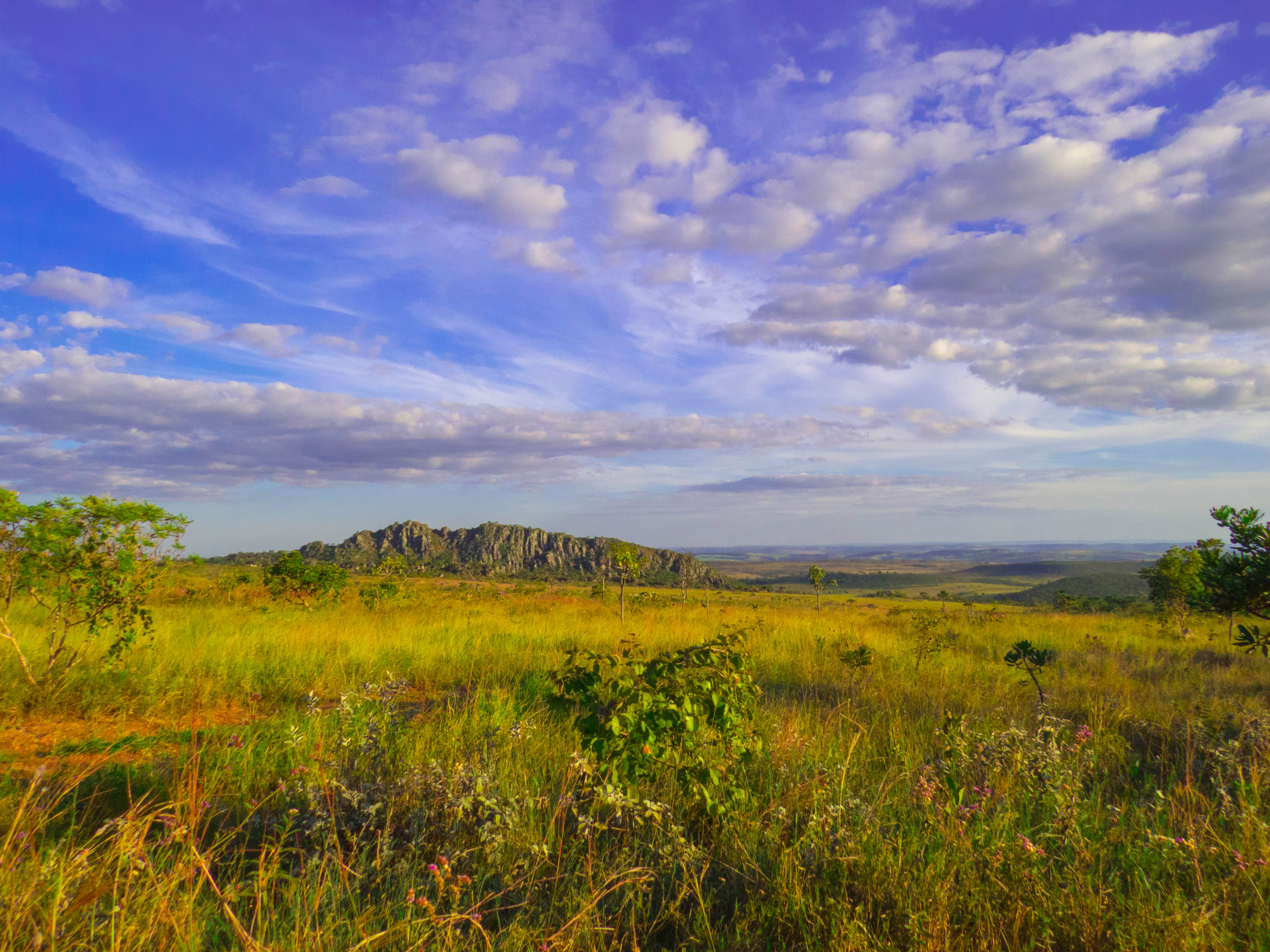
The Cerrado.

The Cerrado presents diverse regions, ranging from clean fields devoid of woody vegetation to cerradão, a dense tree formation. Its climate is particularly striking, presenting two well-defined seasons. The Cerrado is made up of grasslands, Savannahs and dry forests. It is the second largest biome behind the Amazon in South America. It covers around 21% of territory in Brazil and is located in the highlands of central Brazil.

=== Mata Atlântica ===
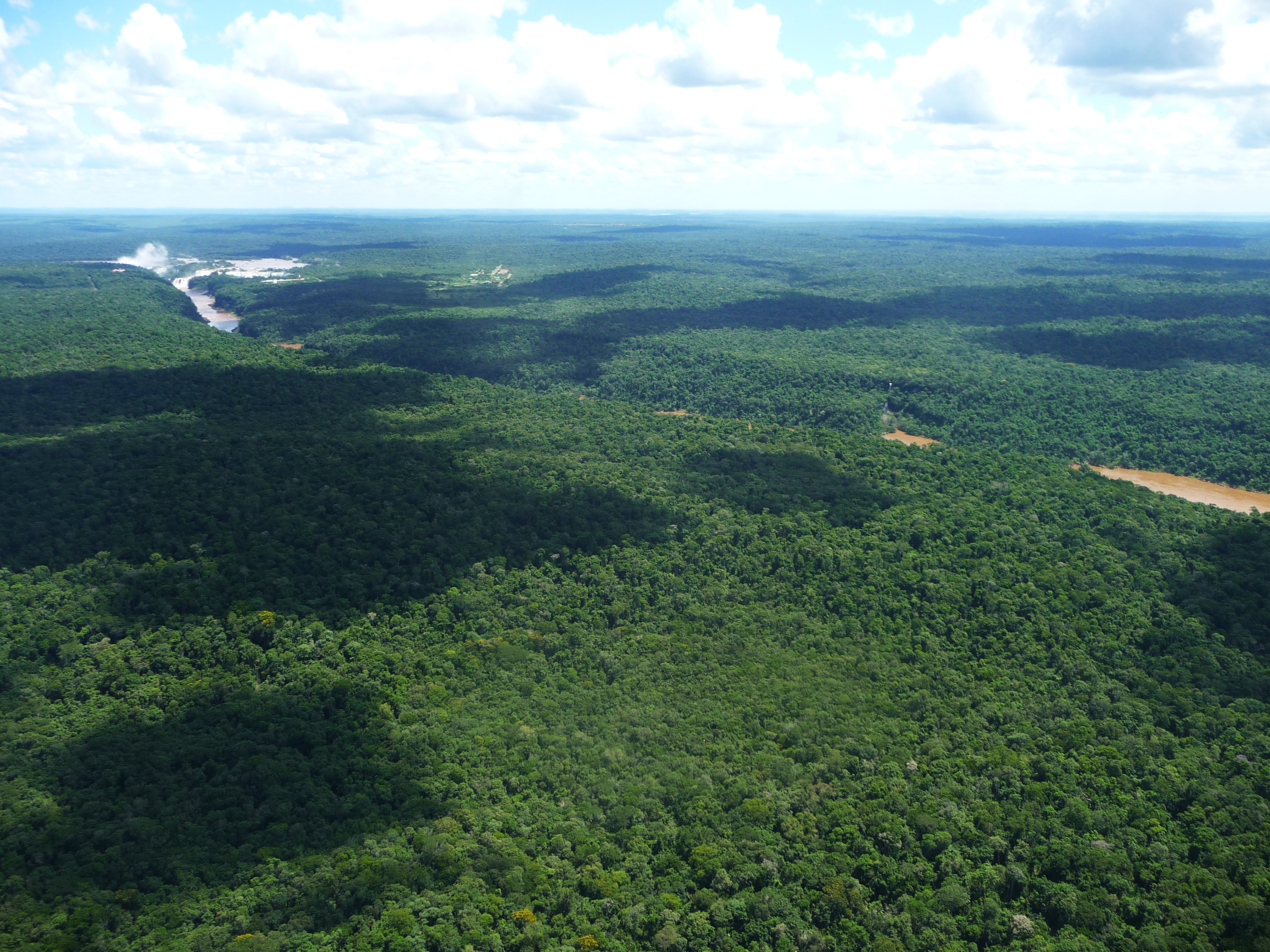
The Mata Atlântica.

The Atlantic Forest is composed of a series of ecosystems with very different structures and composition of flowers, as well as the climatic characteristics of the region where it occurs, having as a common element the exposure to the humid winds that blow from the ocean.

=== Caatinga ===
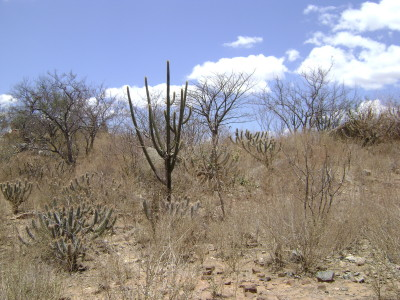
The Caatinga.

The Caatinga has dry soils and its vegetation is formed by palm trees, such as buriti, oiticica, babassu and carnauba. Much of its northeastern part suffers a high risk of desertification due to the degradation of vegetation cover and soil. Caatinga is located in the Northeast part of South America and covers about 12% of the region.

=== Pampa ===
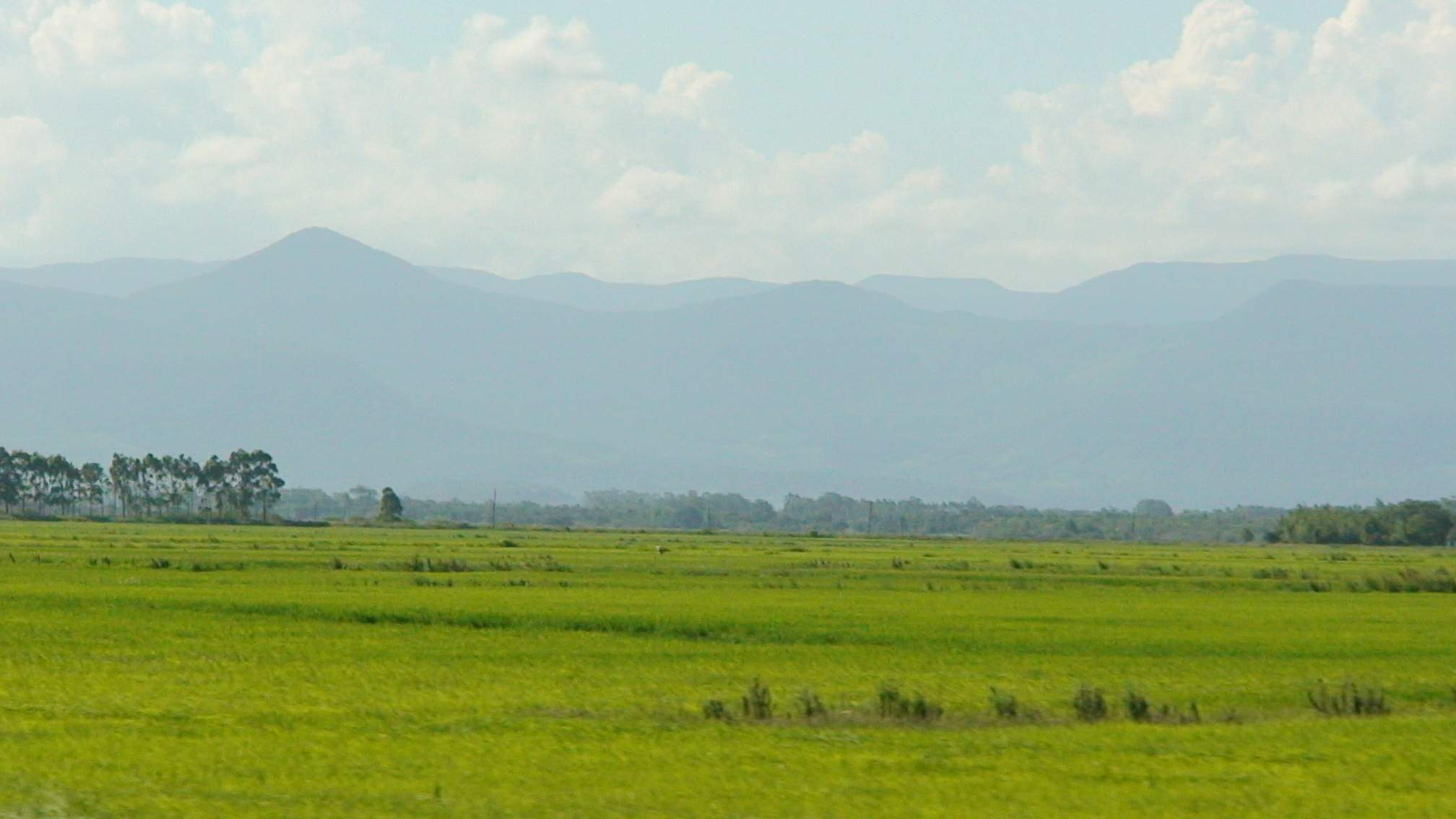
The Pampa.

The Pampa is characterized by the amount of herbaceous species and several typologies of the country, composing in some regions, environments integrated with the Araucária forest. The flat plains of the Gaucho plains and plateaus and the soft-wavy reliefs are colonized by pioneering species that form an open savanna vegetation.

=== Pantanal ===
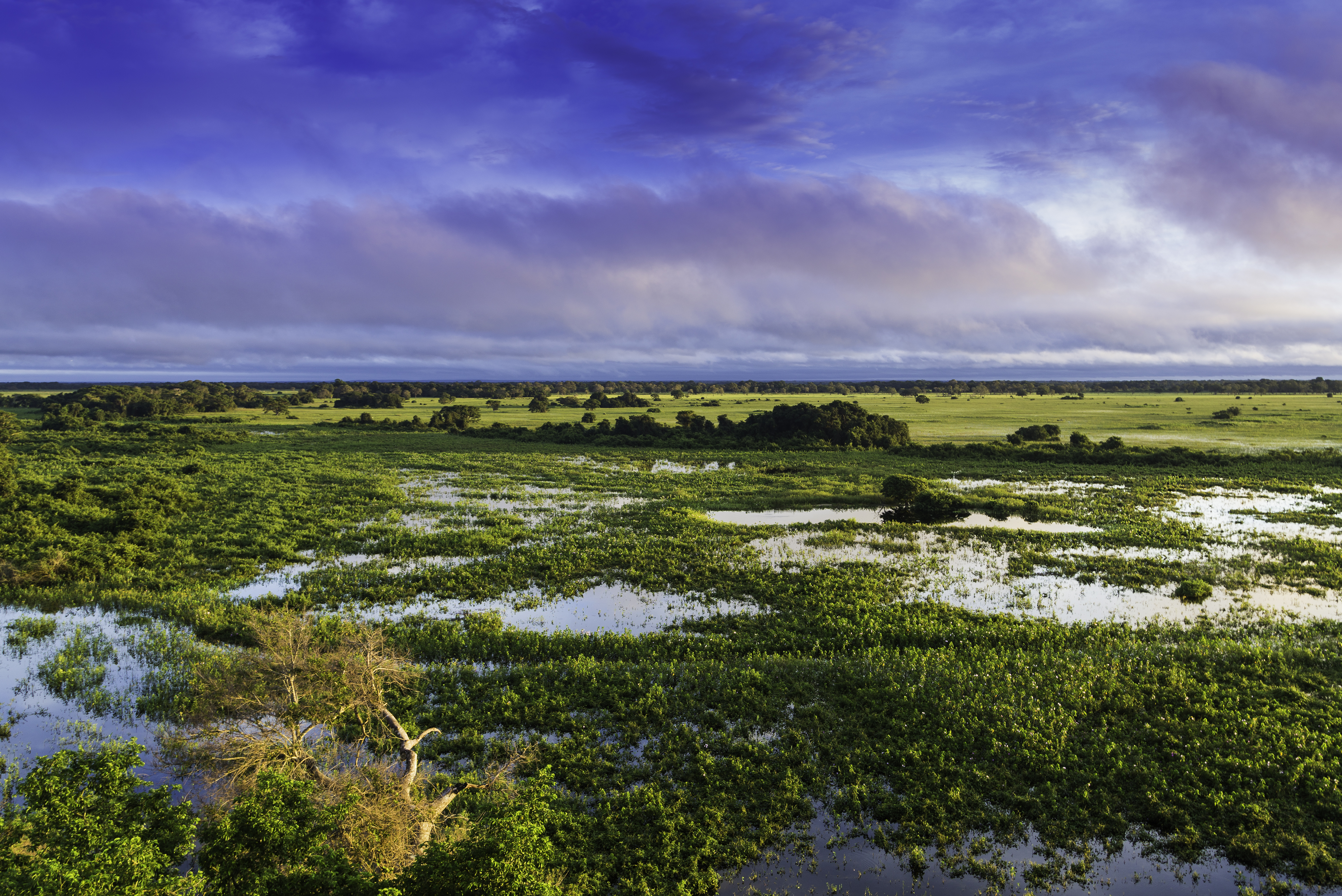
The Pantanal.

The Pantanal is an alluvial plain influenced by rivers that drain the basin of the Upper Paraguay, where it develops a fauna and flora of rare beauty and abundance. This ecosystem is formed by largely sandy terrains, covered by different physiognomies due to the variety of microregions and flood regimes.

== Marine biome ==
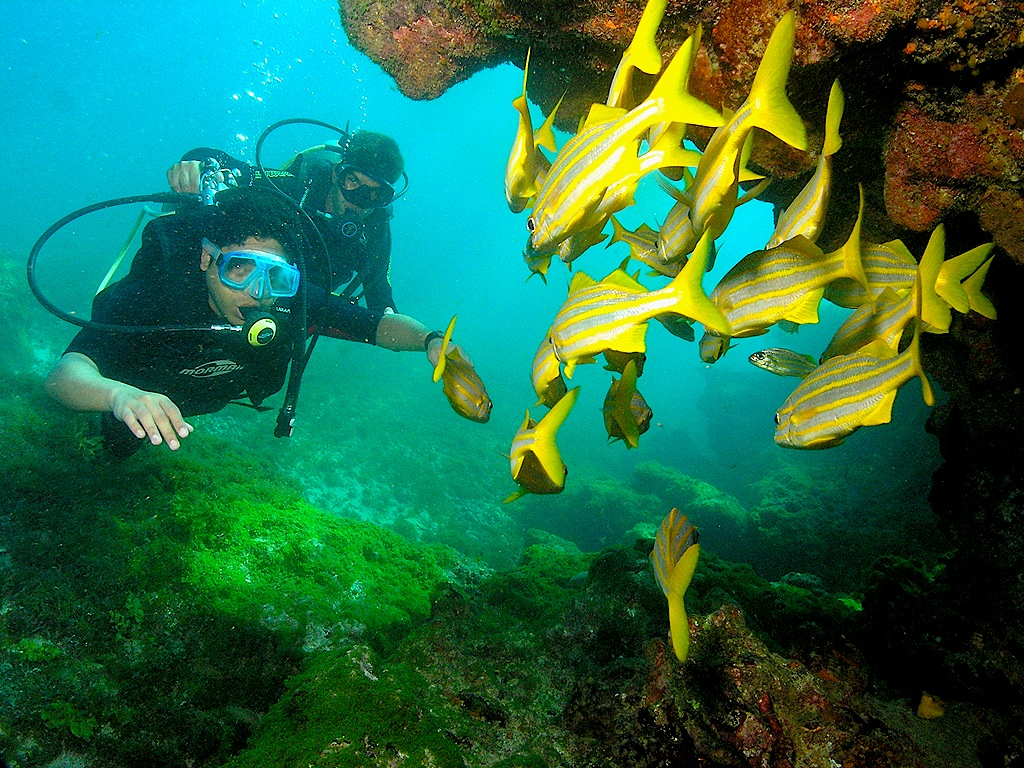
The Fernando de Noronha archipelago.

The Brazilian marine biome is located on the "Marine Zone of Brazil", the continental shelf biotope, and presents several ecosystems.

The Brazilian Coastal Zone has as distinctive aspects in its long extension through different biomes that arrive until the coast, the biome of the Amazônia, the biome of the Caatinga and bioma of the Atlantic Forest. These biomes with wide variety of species and ecosystems, cover more than 8,500 km of coastline.

== Environmental Sustainability Solutions ==
Wind energy is a key source of electricity in Brazil. In northeast Brazil, the states Rio Grande do Norte, Piau, Ceara, and Bahia contain majority of the wind farms. A downside of wind farms is adapting specific wind turbine technology to each area to best suit their wind conditions and geographics. Planning spaces for wind turbines is also crucial because the area must be able to support the project both environmentally and technically. If this is done inadequately, the production of energy from the wind turbines will be insufficient, and the project will cost more money.

Conservation of the Amazon is threatened by deforestation. Solutions include the UNESCO Man and the Biosphere Program, which designates conservation sites as protected and separates them from urban areas. The UNESCO biosphere reserve designations have reduced deforestation in some biospheres. However, one biosphere did not see a reduction in deforestation, while it increased in the final biosphere.

== See also ==
- Geography of Brazil
- Environmental issues in Brazil
