= FZB =

FZB may refer to:

- Research Center Borstel (Forschungszentrum Borstel), a German interdisciplinary biomedical research institution
- Faunal Zone B (early Miocene, 15.97-23.03 myr), a fossil zone for Riversleigh fauna
- Fazal Bhambro railway station, Pakistan, by station code
- Zandbergen railway station, a railway station in Belgium by station code
- Fundação Zoobotânica do Rio Grande (Zoobotanical Foundation of Rio Grande do Sul), a former governmental agency; see Environmentalism in Rio Grande do Sul § Political and institutional aspects
- FZB, a signaling system used with goods wagons
