= Environmentalism in Rio Grande do Sul =

Brazilian environmentalist movement

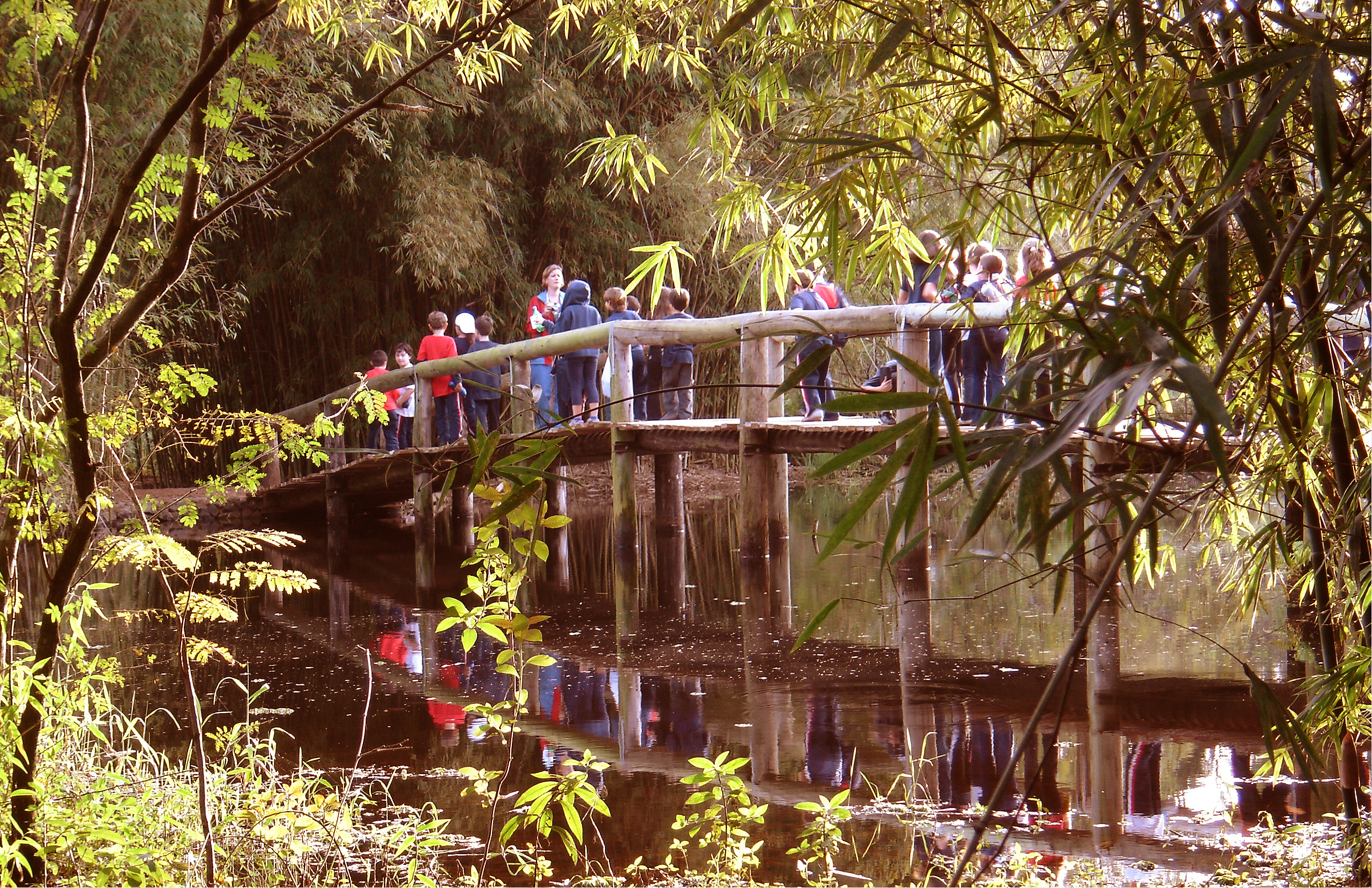
Environmental education for schoolchildren at the Porto Alegre Botanical Garden

Environmentalism in Rio Grande do Sul refers to the movement constituted by scientists and laymen in defense of the environment of the Brazilian state of Rio Grande do Sul. Although there are some records of protests against environmental destruction as early as the 19th century, a more consistent movement only took shape in the mid-20th century, following scientific advances and realizing that the destruction and emerging threats at this time were already significant. Since then, environmentalism has proven to be a topic of growing popular appeal.

A pioneer of Brazilian environmentalism, the state has a significant history in this field, and has often presented innovative proposals. Rich in biodiversity, Rio Grande do Sul has developed a series of initiatives for the promotion of research, teaching and dissemination of ecological concepts, both in public and private spheres; the government has made and continues to make large investments in projects of various kinds, such as sanitation, the recovery of degraded areas and the creation of protected areas. There are multiple environmental associations, cooperatives and NGOs, which promote activism and present promising practical results, and the subject is developed in schools and communities, in general with good receptiveness.

However, the state also faces the issues of pollution, deforestation and desertification, among others, and is suffering the impacts of progressive global warming, which pose important challenges for its future development, besides having a long list of endangered species, many of them already considered locally extinct or in the process of imminent disappearance. In addition, enforcement is often precarious, hampered by chronic shortages of human and material resources, and reports of abuses are frequent. The controversies about the theme are also great, generating deadlocks, and powerful political and economic interests that oppose it hinder the advance of the matter. In recent years, the state environmental legislation has been drastically weakened.

== History of environmental awareness in the state ==
=== Precedents ===
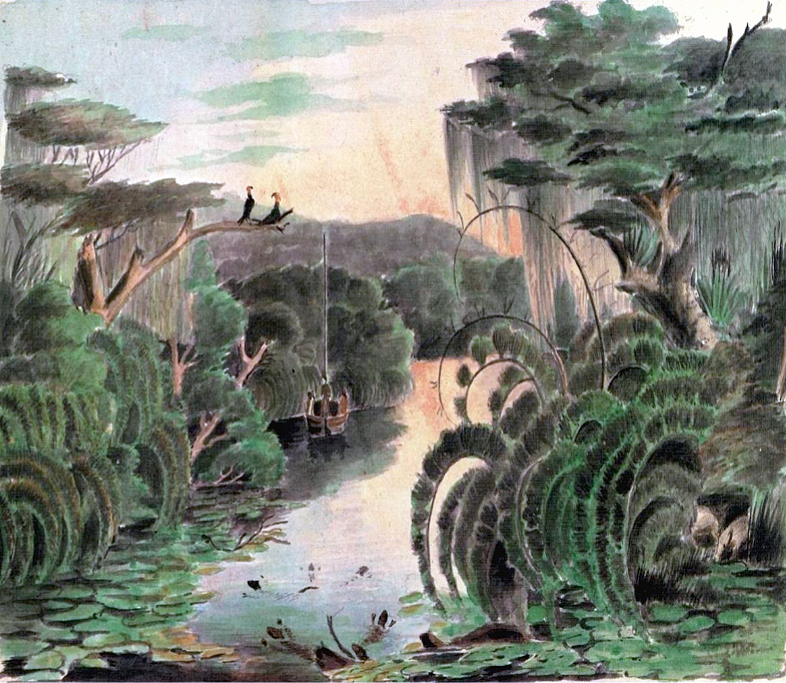
Virgin forest in the center of the state in 1851, watercolor by Herrmann Rudolf Wendroth

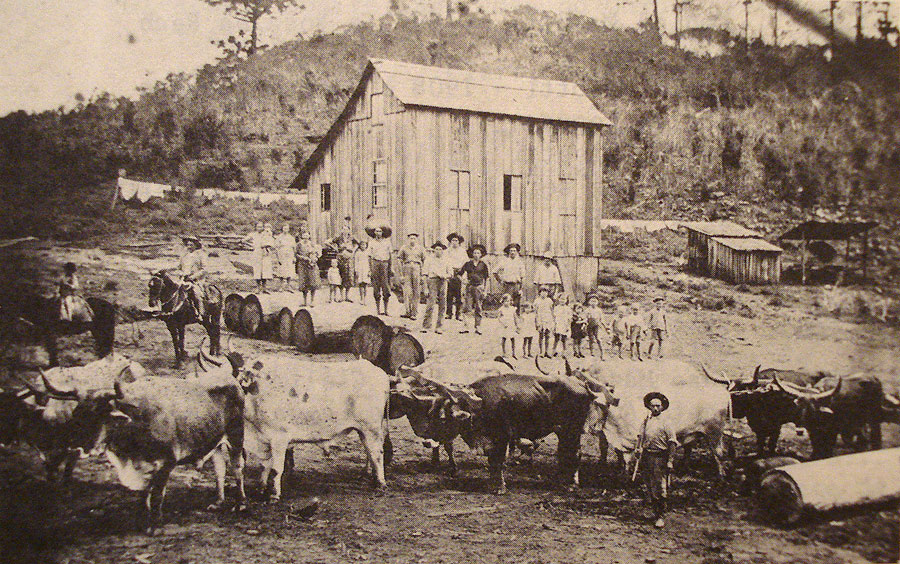
Italian settlers transporting araucaria logs. In the background, the devastated forest

Many accounts survive from travelers and explorers of past centuries about the richness of the fauna and flora, and the beauty of the landscape of Rio Grande do Sul. In the 17th century, Jesuits reported the existence of tapirs on the coast. In 1703, Domingos da Filgueira taught how to take advantage of the abundance of deer and capybaras in the fields. In 1738, government provisions tried to protect the people of the Rio Grande and Pelotas regions from the jaguars that lived there in great numbers, and in the early 19th century, the traveler Nicolau Dreys reported the existence of hunters who still sold fifty pelts of the feline per month. In 1857, Avé-Lallemant was amazed by the number of birds living on the shores of the Lagoa dos Patos, which were covered in scrub, and was delighted with the exuberance of the flora in the region of São Leopoldo. At the end of the 19th century, mullet were still being caught in Porto Alegre and dorado was still being fished in the Sinos River. When Italian colonization began in the northeast, in 1875, the region was virgin and covered by the araucaria forest.

Much of this wealth no longer exists. Forests and animals have disappeared, pollution has taken over many rivers, and urbanization, cattle raising, and agriculture advanced, profoundly altering the primitive landscape. Environmental consciousness was slow to form, although some of those travelers already pointed out the dangers of unbridled exploitation of the environment. Reinhold Hensel, arriving in the state in 1865, was one of them, and in his writings recorded that the birds that Lallemant had described as abundant less than a decade ago were already scarce, that the hills of Porto Alegre, also once covered with trees, were already largely taken over by undergrowth, and, in observing the way German colonization was taking place in the Sinos valley, expressed a prophetic concern:

"In contrast to the frequently mentioned precariousness in the construction of roads and bridges is the lack of consideration with which the forests are destroyed in the establishment and expansion of the settlements, so that timber for construction, at least in the older tracks, is already becoming scarce. ... The settler cannot be forbidden to clear his land as he pleases, it would only have been the government's task to act more carefully ... and to consider the eventuality that sooner or later, with the present methods, there would be a shortage of timber and water in the forest districts intended for agricultural cultivation. With the slow but increasing clearing of the high parts of the forest comes a reduction in the regular rainfall, and now not infrequently the remains of old streams, whose sources have dried up since the founding of the colonies, are found on the hills between the tracks. ... Formerly, the forest protected the humus-rich cover of the mountain soil, but now it is exposed to the rains and is carried more and more into the valleys so that all the higher parts of the deforested forests will become unfit for cultivation, and even for forestry, ... but the shortsightedness of Brazilians in all things national economy does not allow them this look into the future."

=== Beginning of the movement ===
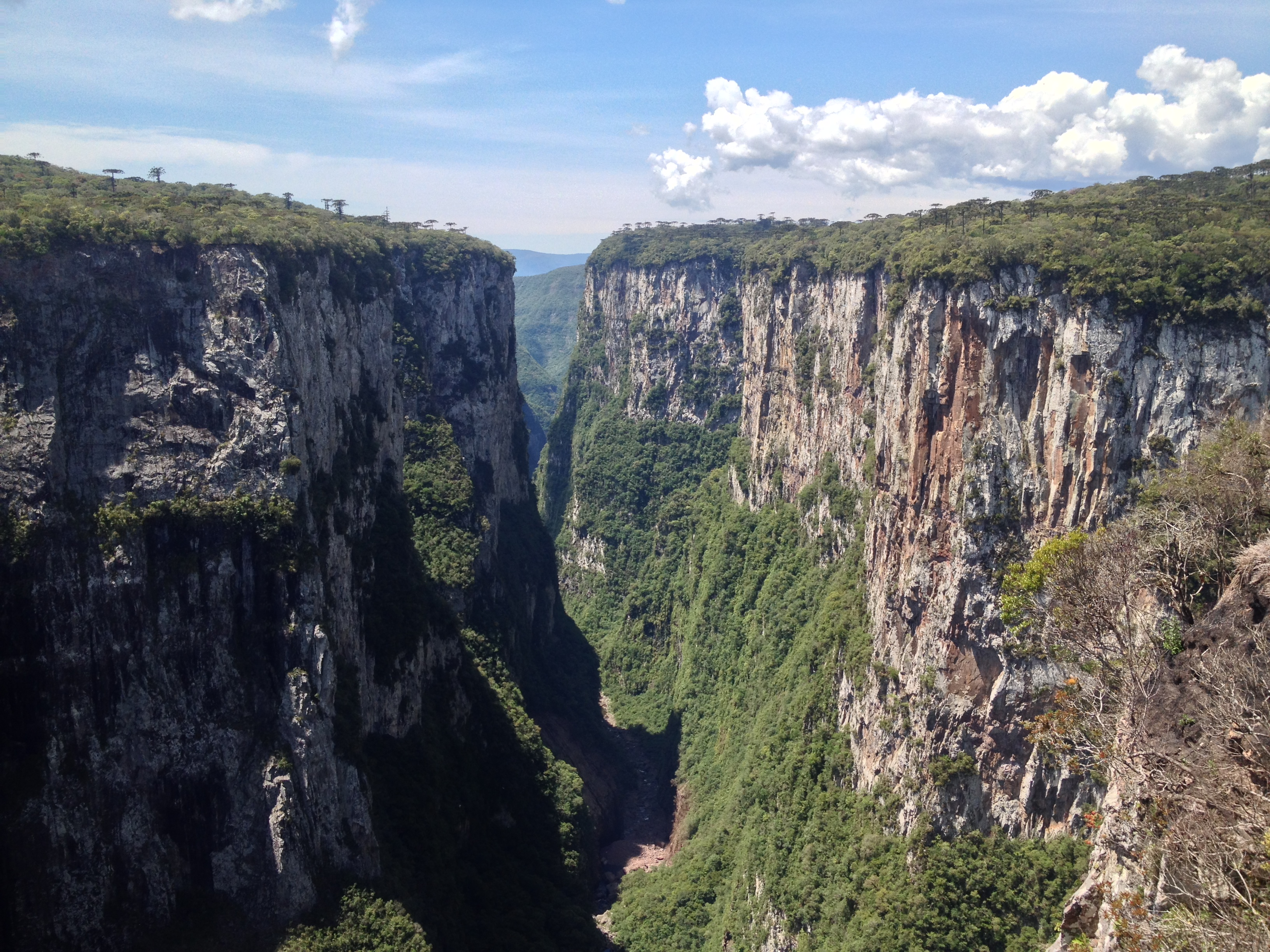
Itaimbezinho canyon in the Aparados da Serra National Park.

Although in the 1940s there was significant environmental legislation at the national level, notably the Forest Code (1934), in the state, awareness was practically null. At this time Father Balduíno Rambo appeared and in a monograph of 1941, he denounced the predatory action of the logging industry in the Uruguay River valley and recommended the creation of two forest parks, one in upper Uruguay and the other in the Aparados da Serra. In his work A Fisionomia do Rio Grande do Sul (1942), he dedicated his last chapter to "Nature Protection," defending the protection of natural monuments, endangered species, and the integration between man and nature, stating: "A people that neglect this element would lack an essential requirement of true total human culture, and would be unworthy of the abundance of the land, as the prodigal hand of the Creator has gifted it." He was a pioneer, preceding the ecological studies of Wanderbilt Duarte de Barros, the first director of Itatiaia National Park (the first national park to be founded).

Around the same time, the first ecological inspector of the state emerged, Henrique Luís Roessler, an accountant at the State Port Delegation, who, on his initiative, dedicated himself to observing hunting and fishing activities on weekends, obtaining accreditation with the Ministry of Agriculture to officially act as an inspector. He lost it, however, by fining without authorization tanneries that polluted the rivers in the São Leopoldo region. In 1955, he founded the União Protetora da Natureza (Nature Protection Union), the first environmentalist organization in Brazil, and then began publishing pamphlets and a series of articles on ecological issues in the newspaper Correio do Povo, in Porto Alegre. To those who could not engage, he pleaded "a prayer for dying nature, asking that the merciful Omnipotent modify the predatory mentality of our people."

Roessler wrote his last article in 1963, and soon afterward, with the military coup of 1964, the Brazilian social movements were disbanded, dissolving also the incipient environmental movement. However, among the organizations that supported the coup was the Ação Democrática Feminina Gaúcha (ADFG), led in the 1970s by Magda Renner, who turned out to be an active environmental advocate. She was influenced in the direction of her ecological work by a lecture given by José Lutzenberger in 1972 at the Agronomists Association of Porto Alegre. Lutzenberger was prominent in the national movement, having published articles in newspapers and founded in 1971 the Gaúcho Association for the Protection of the Natural Environment (Agapan) together with other supporters of the cause, particularly Augusto Carneiro. These activists are owed mainly the resurgence of environmental awareness in the state, at a time when environmental problems in Brazil were becoming serious, and making Rio Grande do Sul the pioneer of the Brazilian ecological movement.

The two associations would develop a long and fruitful series of awareness campaigns, linked to a larger process of building conscious citizenship when the military regime was in its most oppressive phase. According to Maria Cristina da Silva, the environmental issue played a channeling role for the population, prevented from expressing their concerns, anxieties, and insecurities: "The ecological movement was the cause that united all the complaints." Magda Renner recalled that it was necessary to act with a specific strategy: "We wrapped the issues very well in 'pink paper' because we were going to the street when any street demonstration was forbidden," achieving important results. As an example, in 1974, ADFG and Agapan led a movement in defense of the Guaíba islands that resulted in the creation of the State Park of the Jacuí Delta in 1976. In 1975, ADFG held the first national ecological meeting, bringing together more than five hundred people, and where a pioneering project for recycling household waste was presented, ten years before any similar government initiative in Brazil. In 1978, it mobilized the country, including several government agencies, when the "red tide" was unleashed in Hermenegildo, on the southern coast of the state.

Agapan, in turn, promoted weekly meetings and lectures in its headquarters, disseminating studies and distributing thousands of pamphlets, and became notorious in its fight for the preservation of Lake Guaíba, particularly fighting the pulp mill Borregaard (now Riocell), receiving collaboration from government officials. (Note: The Borregaard pulp mill in Guaíba was known as the center of an ecological struggle in the 1970s. The stench of its gas emissions reached the capital and generated protests, besides dumping liquid effluents into the lake. It was shut down in 1973 as a result of popular mobilization.) The case became emblematic. For Dorfman & Stanislawski, it was "one of the most important ecological struggles in history" and, according to Lilian Dreyer, when the company was installed, while being hailed as the lever of the state developmental pull,

"Without sensing it, they solidified one of the most combative movements of ecological resistance that Brazil has ever known, and inaugurated an unprecedented process of revision of productive methods. ... In a short time, it became a kind of public enemy number one.... It would be difficult to think of any pre-deliberate campaign that would give such media exposure to an emerging movement. ... At the end of 1973, the State Health Secretary went in person to interdict the factory, from then on thrown into a cycle of sanctions that resulted in the enforcement of environmental controls."

=== Expansion and maturity ===
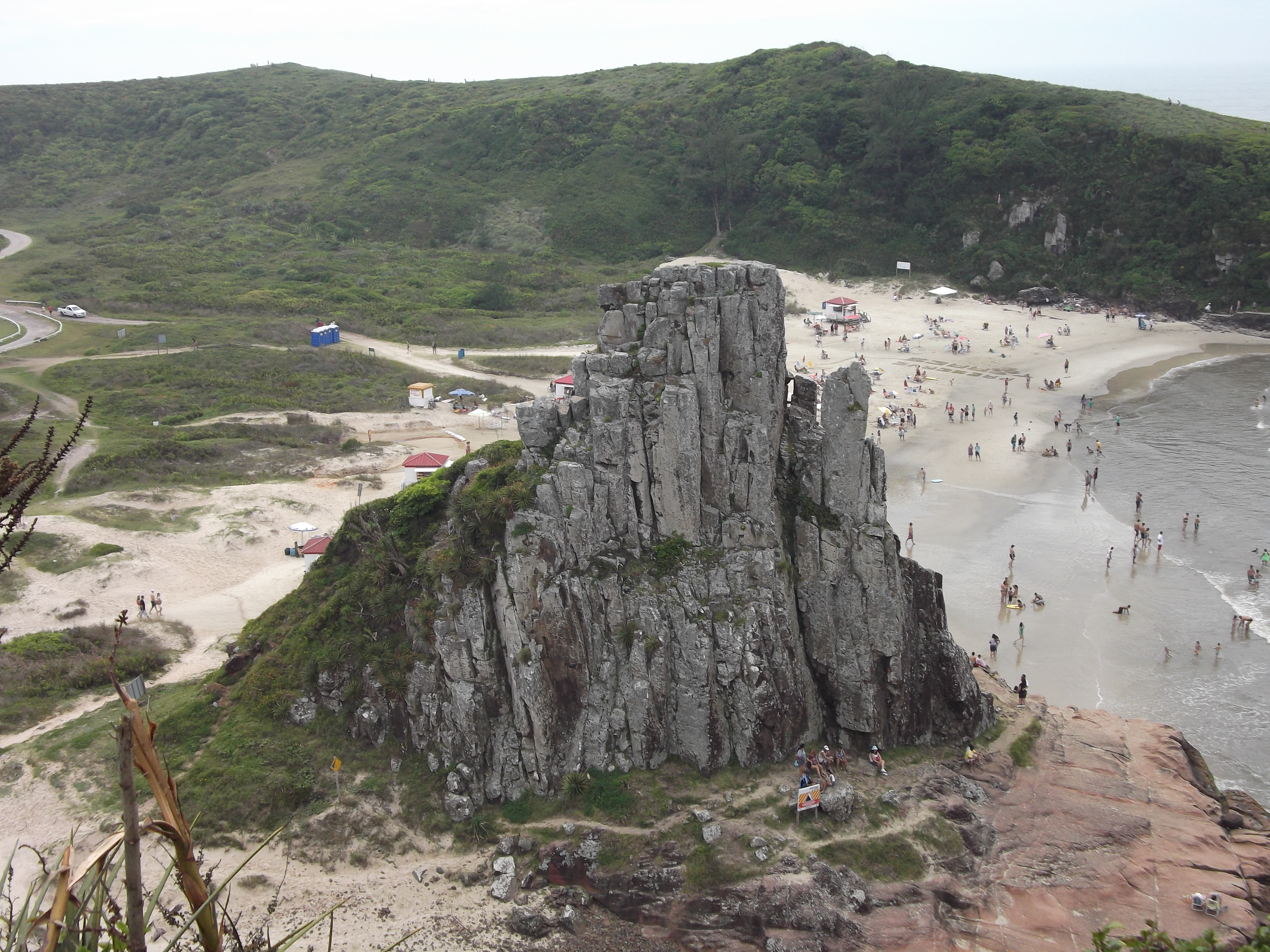
Guarita Beach, in Torres, inserted in the Guarita Park

Magda's and Lutzenberger's activities earned them national and international recognition. Lutzenberger lectured all over the country and produced a number of articles. In 1976, he launched the book Fim do Futuro? or Manifesto Ecológico Brasileiro, which consolidated his leadership in Brazil and developed a strong style of criticism supported by scientific data. In 1977, largely due to his initiative, the Guarita State Park was founded in Torres, and in 1987, after leaving Agapan, he created the Gaia Foundation. Later he joined the Collor government as Secretary of the Environment, inviting Magda to be part of the National Council for the Environment team. She held simultaneously a seat on Bird's Brazilian NGO committee.

Other organizations began to emerge: In 1974, the Interdepartmental Center for Ecological Studies was created at the Federal University of Rio Grande do Sul; in 1978, Coolméia was created, a cooperative of consumers and farmers that fought against the use of pesticides and offered organic products. At the same time, several ecological reserves were created, such as the Lami José Lutzenberger Biological Reserve, owned by the Porto Alegre municipality, and others managed by the state government, such as the Camaquã State Park, the Podocarpus State Park, the Espinilho State Park, and the Ibitiriá State Park. The state press was especially receptive and gave space to news on the subject, many times in an emotional tone, as can be seen in headlines from the 1970s: "Deforestation: The Amazon could become a desert", "Agony of our rivers", "Saving nature to save human beings", "Pollution: death coming from the air". Such news became frequent, and while newspapers took advantage of the problems to sell more, it also indicated a dramatic change in public opinion, which became more interested and sensitized on a large scale.

Green Party Logo

In the following decade, some politicians with environmentalist platforms managed to elect themselves councilmen in Porto Alegre, starting a tradition in 1982 with Caio Lustosa, affiliated with PMDB. The movement began to seek organization on a broader scale, scheduling several meetings in 1984. These meetings also took place in other states, and their keynote was the dialogue between the various sectors of society, the definition of priority actions and ways to influence the Constitutional project, also discussing the need for the foundation of a Green Party (which took place in 1986). In 1985, the Rio Grande do Sul movement managed to gain space for independent questioning of the candidates for the capital's government. The participation of university students, the press, unions, neighborhood associations, alternative rural communities, and the landless grew in this decade, which increasingly influenced the actions of the state and municipal governments. A national integration of activism was articulated, which, according to Eduardo Viola and Ailton dos Santos, was showing signs of maturity, becoming multidisciplinary, and moving toward socioecology.

From the mid-1980s on, alternative agriculture NGOs started to structure themselves to search for new ways of cultivation, and initiatives linked to the Lutheran Church and government agencies also appeared in several regions, and in the following decade environmental associations multiplied throughout the state. A 1995 study developed by Claudia Schmitt indicated the existence of 50 entities registered in the National Fund for the Environment, but, according to the researcher, this number should be much higher, because many small associations did not formalize their registration They were largely sustained by members' contributions, often faced a chronic lack of resources, and did not present a significant degree of professionalism.

Still in the 1990s, the Pro-Guaíba Program, conceived in the previous decade through the influence of the environmental movement, was established. With it, the government intended to improve the quality of life and restore the ecological balance of the entire Lake Guaíba watershed region, the most populous and polluted in the state, with more than 250 municipalities that account for about 70% of the state's GDP. The first module invested more than 222 million dollars, 60% of which came from the Inter-American Development Bank, in sanitation, protected areas, soil, and solid waste management, among many other projects. As pointed out by Professor André Silveira, director of the Institute of Hydric Research at UFRGS, thepProgram was especially positive in that it tried to address the causes of pollution in an integrated way, in a sustainable model, but he regrets that the second stage was canceled due to lack of state resources for the necessary counterpart.

== Recent initiatives ==
Besides legislation, protected areas, and activism, several public and private initiatives in recent years have promoted the management and monitoring of natural resources, environmental education, and awareness on a large scale, and instilled in the population a new sense of social responsibility, with practical measures that change the daily lives of many people and promote environmental conservation. The State Environmental Code states, in Article 1, that if the right to a balanced environment is common to all of society, it is also everyone's responsibility to act for its preservation:

"Everyone has the right to an ecologically balanced environment, an asset of common use of the people and essential to a healthy quality of life, imposing on the State, municipalities, the coletividade (collectivity) and citizens the duty to defend, preserve and conserve it for present and future generations, ensuring the protection of ecosystems and the rational use of environmental resources."

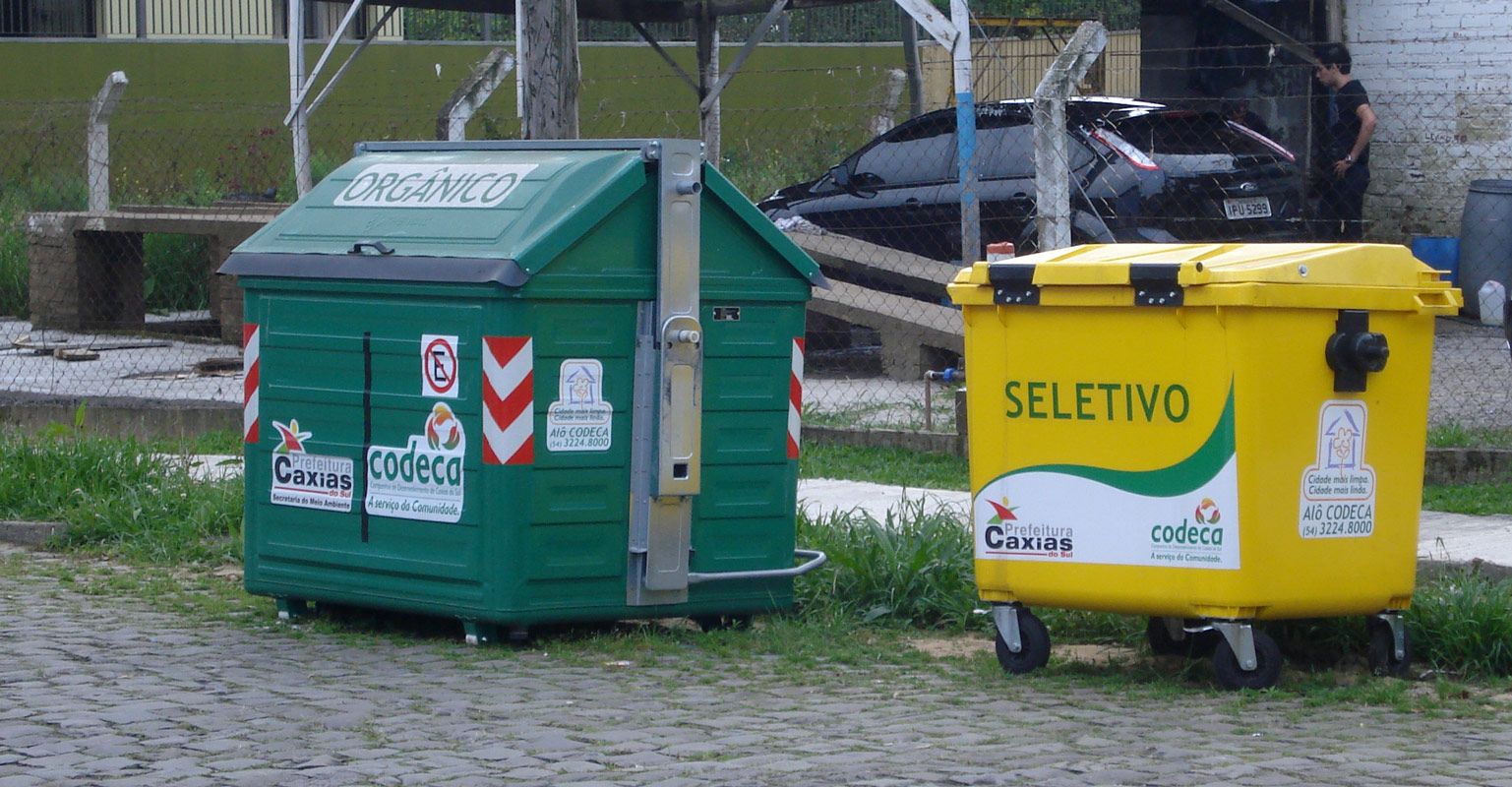
Selective waste collection in Caxias do Sul

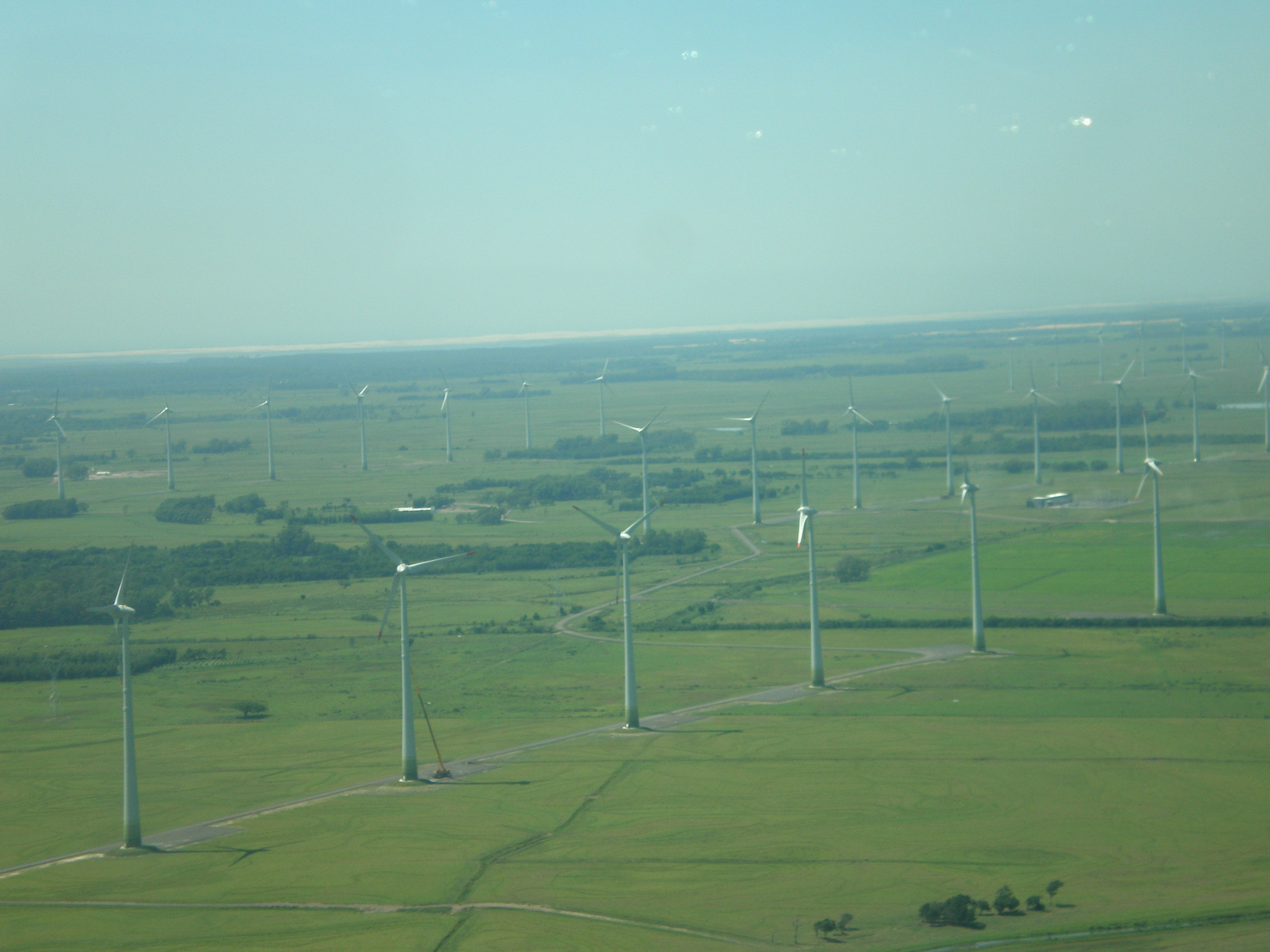
Osório Wind Farm

=== Selective waste collection ===
The same principle is enshrined in the Federal Constitution, in its article 225. In this regard, there are programs for the selective collection and recycling of garbage, giving a differentiated destination to each type of material and reusing it, with growing signs of approval and popular adhesion in Porto Alegre and in many other cities. A 2000 survey indicated that 30% of Rio Grande do Sul municipalities had selective collection and 22% had recycling, in a much higher proportion than the national average (respectively 8.2% and 6.4%) and adding up to 31% of the total municipalities in Brazil with these services.

=== Renewable energy ===
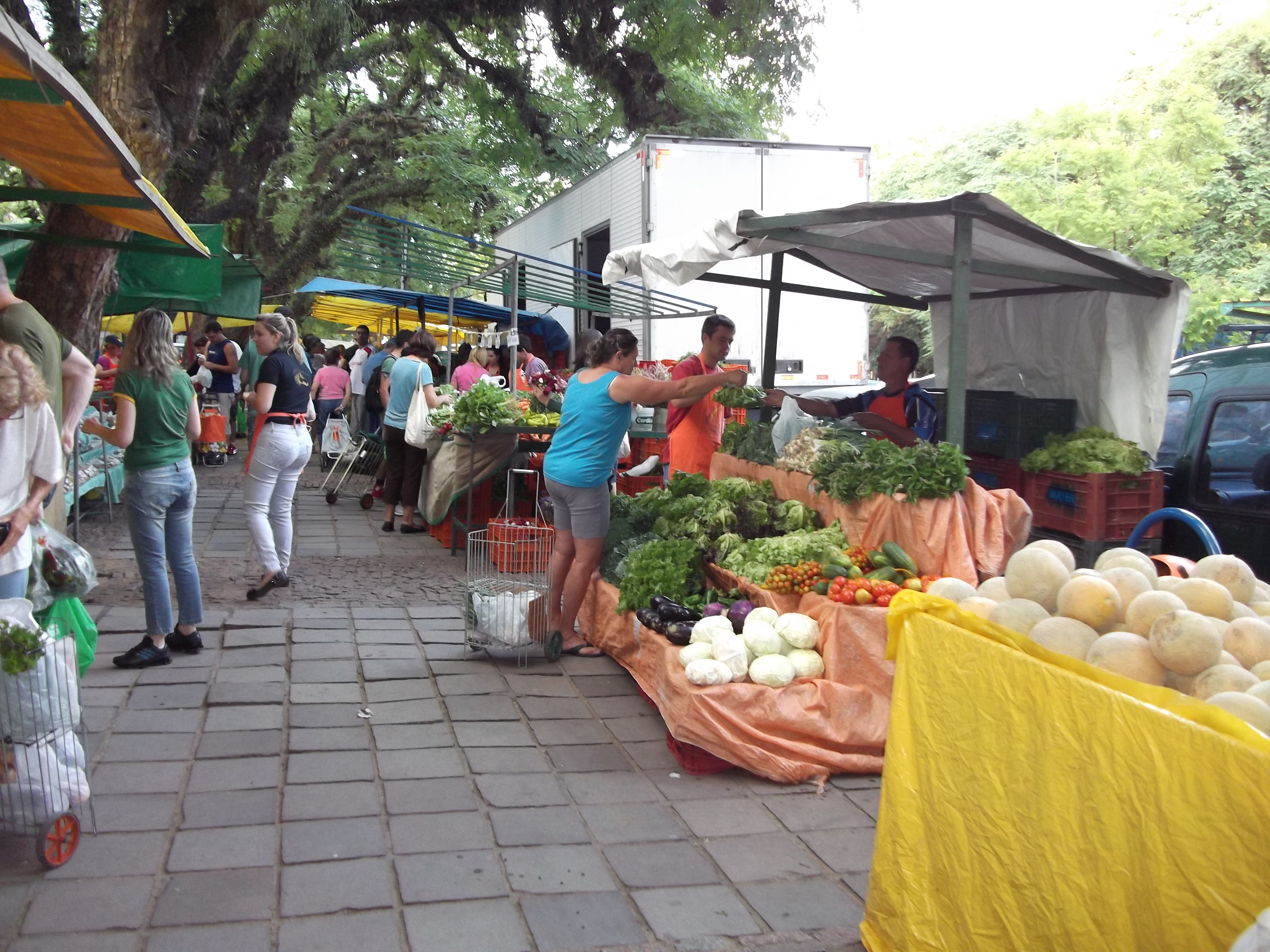
Ecological Fair in Porto Alegre

There has been a growing interest in renewable and cleaner energies, although the state at this point lags behind the national trend. Since 2007, Osório has had the largest wind farm in Latin America, and other regions, such as Palmares do Sul, Viamão, Jaguarão, Piratini, and Santana do Livramento, are developing tests and studies for the implementation of similar plants, considering the state's high potential in this sector, with 15% of the estimated total for Brazil. In 2011, 58 wind-farm projects were submitted to auction, which resulted in the contracting of 42 projects, with a total installed capacity of 1,211.5 MW, about one-third of the state's average energy-demand. Other projects have foreseen the expansion of biodiesel production. The state is a large producer of soy, responsible for 86% of the oil produced locally. Besides encouraging agriculture, it fixes production in the domestic market and has as a by-product soybean meal, which can be used in animal feed. Passo Fundo is the sixth-largest national producer of biodiesel, with 8% of the total.

=== Sustainability ===
As far as sustainable agriculture is concerned, there have been active projects since the 1980s, seeking alternative means of cultivation that are compatible with ecological concepts. In the words of Miguel Altieri, "the discussion on sustainable development gained rapid momentum in response to the decline in the quality of rural life as well as the degradation of the natural resource base associated with modern agriculture. [...] Agricultural production is no longer a purely technical issue but is now seen as a process conditioned by social, cultural, political, and economic dimensions". In recent years, the trend has been growing due to the demand for a new consumer market and official support.

In 1999, the I Seminário Estadual de Agroecologia produced the Carta Agroecológica, a document that gave rise to a governmental program financed by Banrisul, with significant investments. According to Azambuja, Martins & Ferreira, the program was innovative and had the merits of qualifying the state's supply-system, privileging the farmer's autonomy, lowering production costs, reducing environmental impact, and promoting health and the exercise of citizenship, through a shared management system. Common practices include crop rotation, the use of soil-recovery plants, direct planting, organic fertilizing, riparian reforestation, and worm-casting. An ecological orientation is also being noticed in livestock- and poultry-farming, with rotational grazing, the search for alternatives to the confined livestock model, the use of homeopathy for disease treatment, and the construction of ecological facilities.

Parallel to these innovations are improvements in basic sanitation, regional tourism, waste-treatment, and the protection of springs. The State Seminar on Agroecology, held its XII edition in 2011, and for many years has been held in parallel to the International Seminar on Agroecology, remaining an important forum for advanced debates and the birthplace of new proposals through the updates of the Agroecological Charter.

=== Education ===
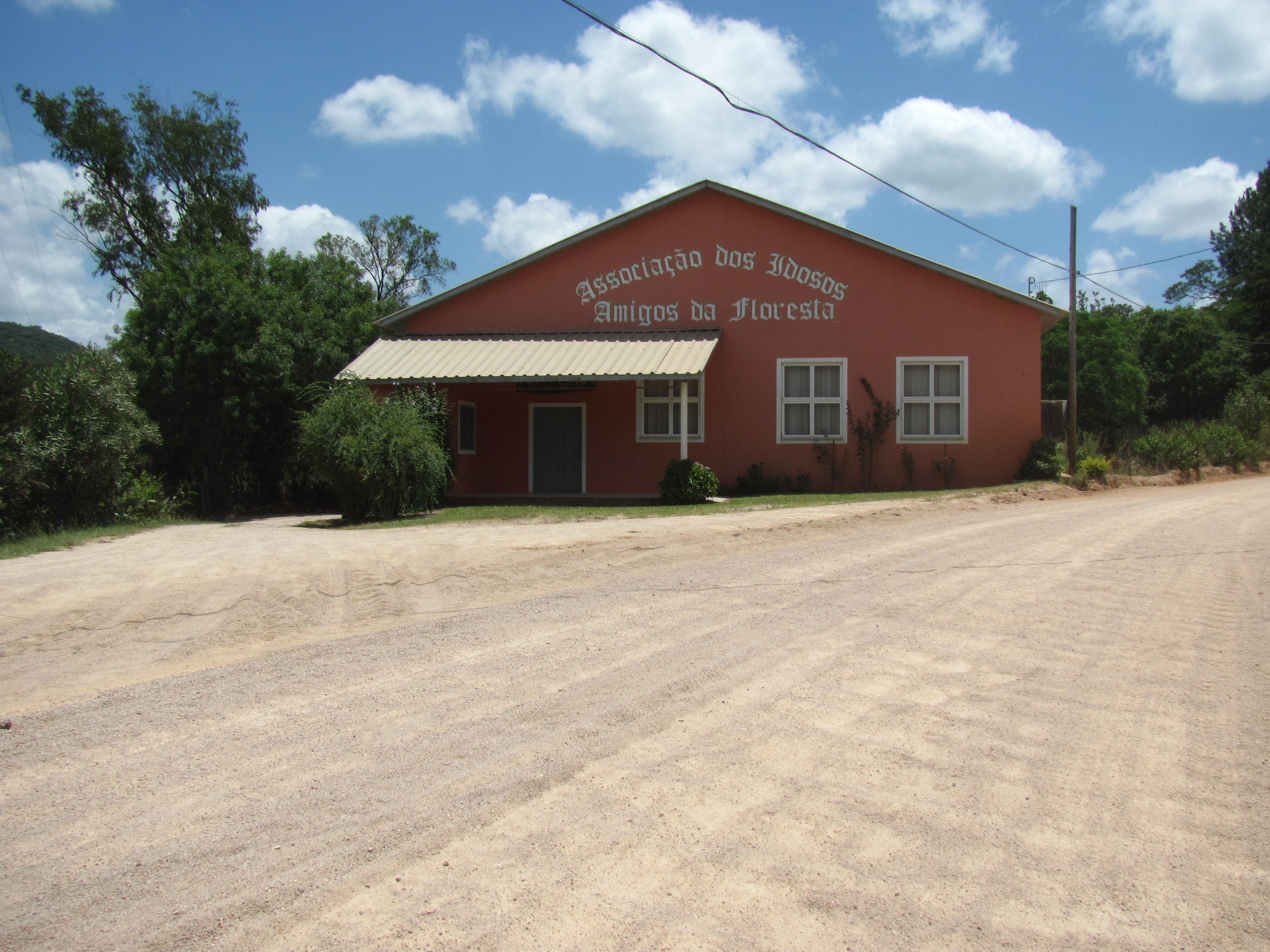
Headquarters of the Association of the Elderly Friends of the Forest, in Sertão Santana.

Environmental education has been strongly encouraged in many areas of society. Universities, colleges, and specialized schools offer undergraduate and graduate courses – as well as courses and workshops for the community – on ecology and related areas. The subject is also studied in public schools, at times with good results, but also with difficulties in the teaching, reception, and application of the concepts transmitted. Government agencies offer courses and activities for communities, and for educating their employees to minimize the environmental impact generated by public services, such as the Environmental Management Program of the State Judiciary.

Ecological tourism, understood as a form of education, but also of sustained management of natural areas, of cultural dissemination, and of generation of foreign exchange and jobs, has significant public support, with activities developed throughout the state, often counting on official support.

=== Chemical waste ===
The treatment of chemical residues and sewage is also on the administrative agenda of several cities, to avoid the dumping of toxic and polluting materials into soils and especially into rivers. In 1999, Greenpeace proposed the challenge that within ten years all Brazilian chemical industries should be treating their effluents, and the Federation of Industries of Rio Grande do Sul was the only business-representative in Brazil to accept it. The goal, however, has not been fully achieved, and despite the existence of specific legislation and control, sometimes there are violations or accidents that end up generating contamination. Positive examples are the sewage treatment programs in Porto Alegre and Caxias do Sul, both major polluters, setting ambitious goals: The former intending to expand its treatment capacity from 27% to 77%, and the latter wishing to treat 86% of its sewage by the end of 2012.

Several other projects are in progress. In the words of Gustavo de Mello, state superintendent of the National Health Foundation, "the mayors want to do sanitation, but the projects were missing. We already have 63 contracted and we are going to bid for 350 more. The time of crying that nobody does anything is over. Now we are in the challenge of doing it." However, progress has been slow. In 2013, in the cited cases of Porto Alegre and Caxias, only 24.3% and 43.6%, respectively, were being treated. By 2015, the percentage in the capital had improved, rising to 33.3%. Water resources in general are managed by a state system and monitored by regional committees, which have been achieving important improvements in their management and preservation.

== Areas of preservation ==
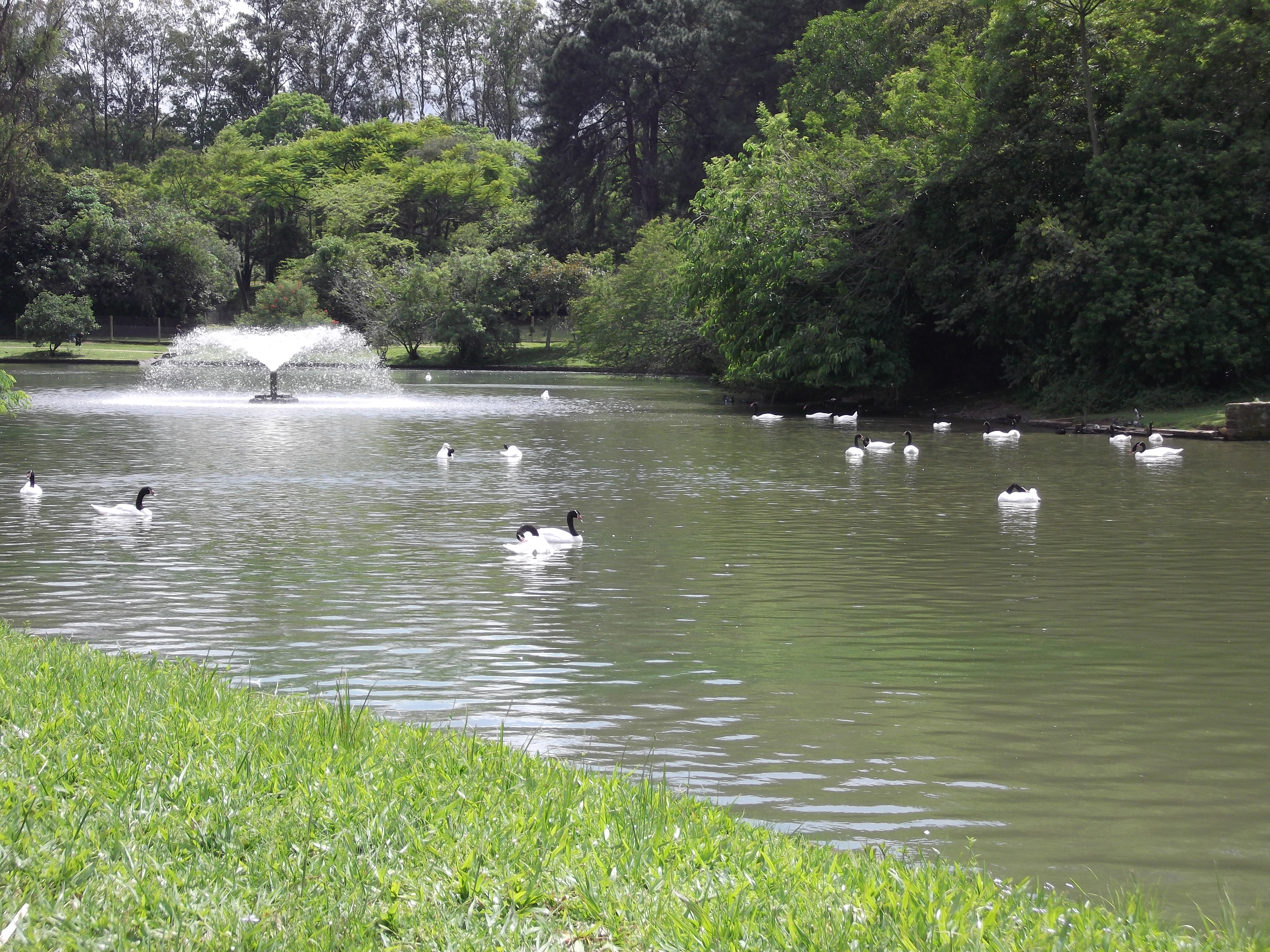
Lake at the Zoo of Rio Grande do Sul

In 1947, the first state park in Rio Grande do Sul was created, Turvo, and at the state level the first legislation was enacted in 1954, in the form of law 2.434, which instituted mandatory licensing for the construction of dams by private parties, and decreed that all forest areas over 250ha belonging to the state be transformed into parks.

Soon afterward organs dedicated to the study and protection of the environment were created, such as the Museum of Natural Sciences, founded in 1955 and which since 1958 publishes the magazine Iheringia, dedicated to flora studies; the Botanical Garden of Porto Alegre, opened in 1958; and the Zoo of Rio Grande do Sul, in 1962. In the interim government, several other regulations were created, including the State Forest Code and the State Parks Regulation, both from 1992, but the one with the broadest scope is the State Environmental Code, approved in 2000.

According to federal law 9.985/2000, the areas of integral preservation are the Ecological Stations, the Biological Reserves, the Parks, the Natural Monuments and the Wildlife Refuges. The rest are designated for sustainable management.

== Controversies and current problems ==
=== At the macro scale ===
Despite the progress achieved, there are still multiple problems to be overcome. Many of their causes are not confined to the state but are affected by national policies and the global context. As Altieri and other authors have pointed out, the controversy over the merits of the environmentalist model still rages on, and often its proposals are considered impractical, clashing with economic and political interests. Both parties have found spokespersons in the most respected scientific community, and there is little consensus on a variety of crucial issues. As an example, for Marcelo Durão, "expectations are pessimistic about Rio+20 [... ] large corporations (are) the main villains of the financial crisis, which started in 2008, and of the current economic crisis that is expanding in Europe, to the extent that they manage to place their interests above (the interests of) the state [....] the strategies formulated [...] do not aim to solve problems such as those that are occurring in the world, among them the changes in labor and environmental laws".

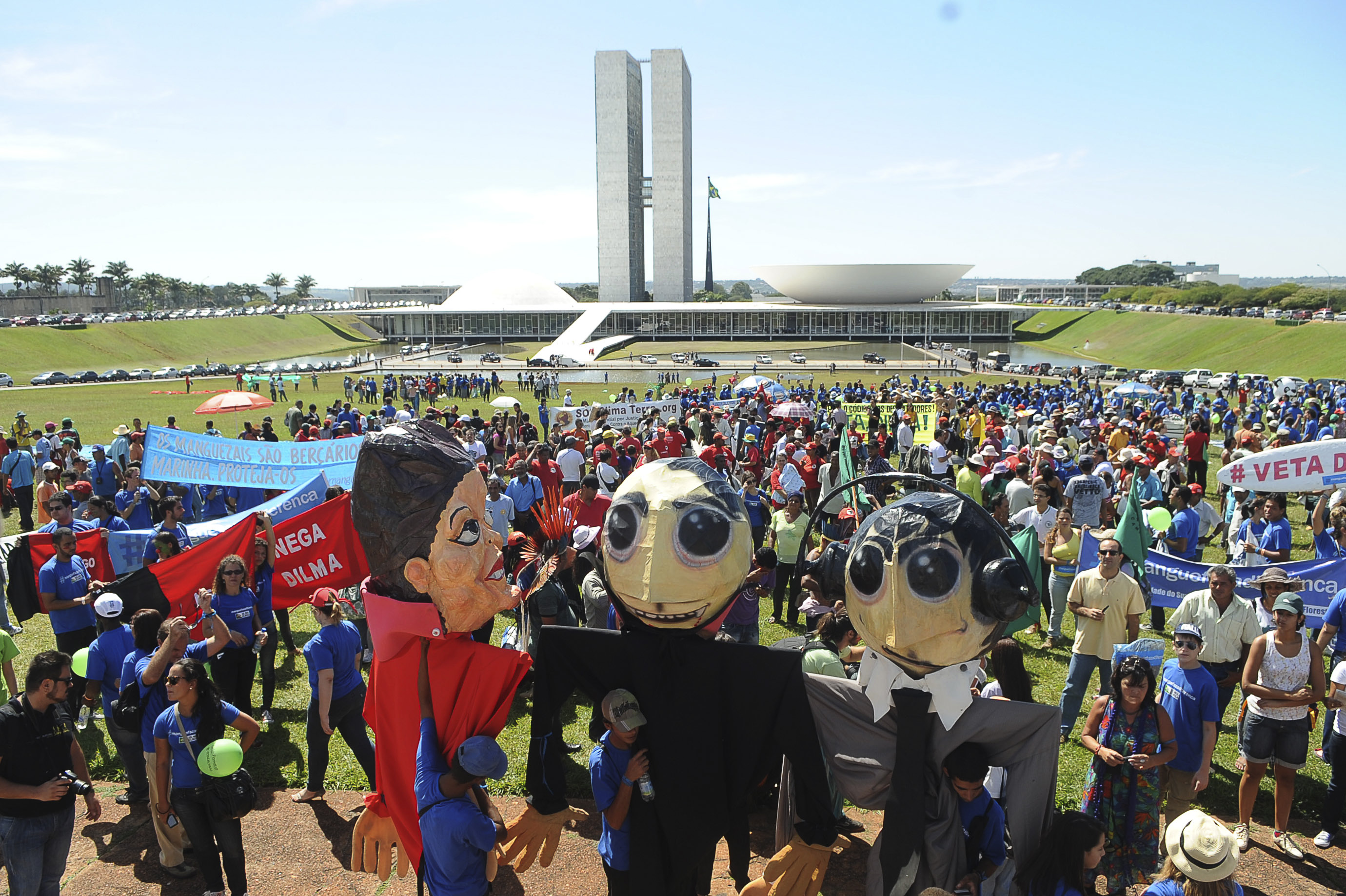
Demonstrators protest at the Esplanade of the Ministries in Brasilia against the approval of the new Forest Code. Photo by Wilson Dias/Agência Brasil

The change in the Brazilian Forest Code was harshly criticized by environmental sectors, which are supported by international organizations such as the World Wildlife Fund and Greenpeace. For them, there is already enough deforested area in Brazil to approximately double food production without cutting down another hectare of forest. The rapporteur of the new text, Aldo Rebelo, was accused of favoring agribusiness and the rural caucus, allowing with the new text the invasion of untouched areas and decreasing the requirements to maintain legal reserves on properties, but defended himself saying that the changes will benefit small producers, understanding that there is a lack of arable land in the country. His arguments were heavily contested by civil society, which was 79% opposed to the new code, and also by scientists and environmentalists, denouncing the setbacks that the new law would trigger, but still, the change was approved. Since then, an extensive series of other measures have been concurring to dismantle environmental legislation and regulation, through presidential decrees, ministerial acts, and legislative reforms in the National Congress, generating harsh criticism and a vast public controversy.

Economic policies that increase interest rates directly influence the rural area, forcing producers to dedicate themselves to exploitation activities with an immediate return. Programs to contain public spending also damage the environment, often considered an area of secondary importance, and make enforcement actions difficult. According to Carlos Young, "less forest has been accompanied by less work in the areas of Atlantic forest converted for agricultural use. [...] There is a great disproportion between the area occupied by cattle ranching and its contribution to the generation of value. [...] The deforestation process was unable to generate adequate living conditions for the rural population". It is also claimed that growing populations need new areas for settlement, but the data does not prove the theory.

=== Local context ===
In the local context, the pulp industry has exerted strong pressure in the state and "arrives with enough economic strength to suppress discussions in the field of biodiversity conservation, as it seeks to expand its area of planting and conversion of pulp into paper in Brazil, Argentina, and Uruguay, as well as to influence the implementation of processing and transportation infrastructure, especially navigation." The Mirim lagoon, the second largest water body in the state, is a priority area for conservation of invertebrates, mammals, birds, amphibians, and reptiles, but suffers from economic exploitation, and is also receiving exotic species that interfere with the balance of the ecosystem. An agreement was signed for the creation of a waterway there, considered a priority for the governments of Brazil and Uruguay, which share its surface, as a strategic connection of Mercosur, and although sustainable development is sought, an environmental impact study of the project revealed bleak prospects.

Another example of the clash between environment, politics and economics comes from the Torres region, where several councilmen protested the creation of the Itapeva Park, accusing the government of failing to pay compensation for the expropriation and preventing economic development in the region. Councilman Carlos Alberto da Rosa said that:

"They even created a law to prevent private cars from driving on the beach, because they are worried about armadillos. [...] Instead of improving, they are diminishing our city. Our city is touristy and we can never lose sight of this. About the island of Lobos (an area of integral protection) he said that "it is the place in Brazil with the best waves for surfing, but surfing there is forbidden. [...] The sea lions only use the island for two months of the year, so why not come to an agreement with the surfers and free the rest of the year?"

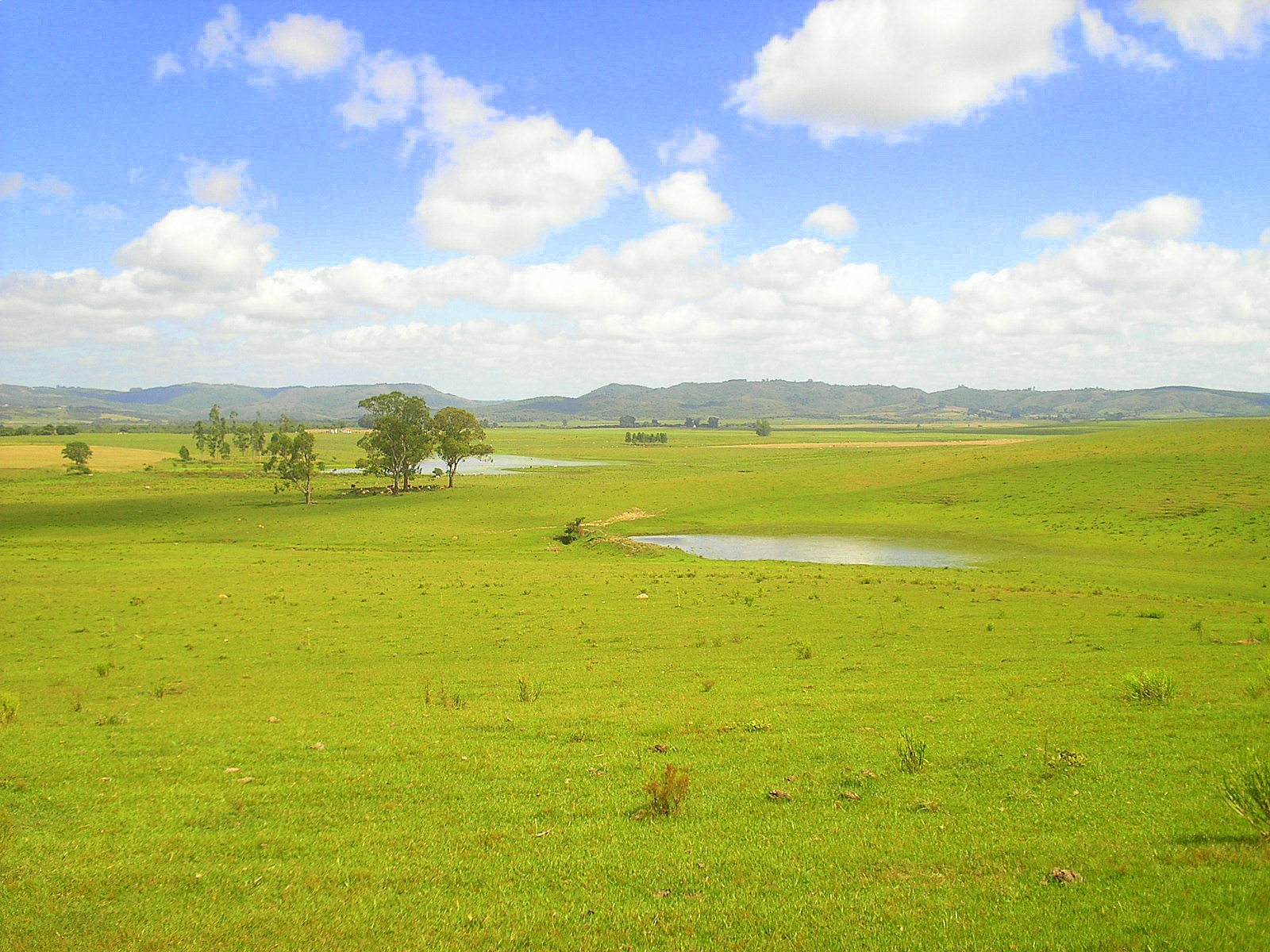
Pampas

==== Desertification ====
The western border of the state is going through desertification. The soil which is sandy, receives little rainfall, and has by nature sparser vegetation cover, besides suffering from the overload of cattle raising and mechanized agriculture. The director-president of the State Foundation for Agricultural Research (Fepagro), Marcos Palombini, said in 2006 that the state has 1.4 million hectares prone to desertification and that in that year 25% of this area was already compromised. According to the Ministry of Environment, historically this biome (pampas) had its area decreased by 54%, and between 2008 and 2009 it lost another 331 km^{2}. Among the main causes are the occupation of rice cultivation, cattle raising, and reforestation with exotic species, such as eucalyptus and pine. Additional aggressions arise from the inadequate use of water resources, among them irrigation and occupation of swamps for cultivation, which in some regions has caused a significant alteration in the environment, with the disappearance of species, erosion, and salinization of the soil, contamination of the water table, spread of diseases, conveyance of toxic loads to rivers and aggradation of their beds, as well as the depletion of natural sources.

==== Deforestation ====
In 2005, a survey indicated that about 975,000 hectares of forest were left in the state, but this corresponds to only about 7% of the original cover. The problem afflicts the highland region, where the Atlantic forest, protected by law, predominates. According to the SOS Mata Atlântica Foundation, in 2009 the rates increased 83% compared to 2005–2008, but reports of illegal logging are emerging in other regions. For geneticist biologist Paula Corrêa, the legislation is insufficient and biologist Maury Abreu stated that enforcement is precarious: "government agencies usually defend themselves by saying that there are no resources, and this is a reality. However, even when resources are available, inspections are not effective. In the end, it seems to me that enforcement acts exclusively on researchers, who face an immense bureaucratic battery to get work done."

The araucaria forest, a subtype of the Atlantic forest, is one of the most threatened ecosystems, due to the logging industry and the expansion of the agricultural frontier. The dominant species of this forest, the araucaria, is critically endangered according to the IUCN. Despite new agreements between IBAMA and productive sectors, the deforested area continues to expand. On the other hand, as pointed out by Márcia Hirota, executive director of the SOS Mata Atlântica Foundation, the official numbers are misleading and the devastation should be much greater since in the northeast of the state, where the forest is located, there is a predominance of small properties, where many losses of small fragments, smaller than 3 hectares, are not considered due to technical limitations in the monitoring system.

==== Pollution ====
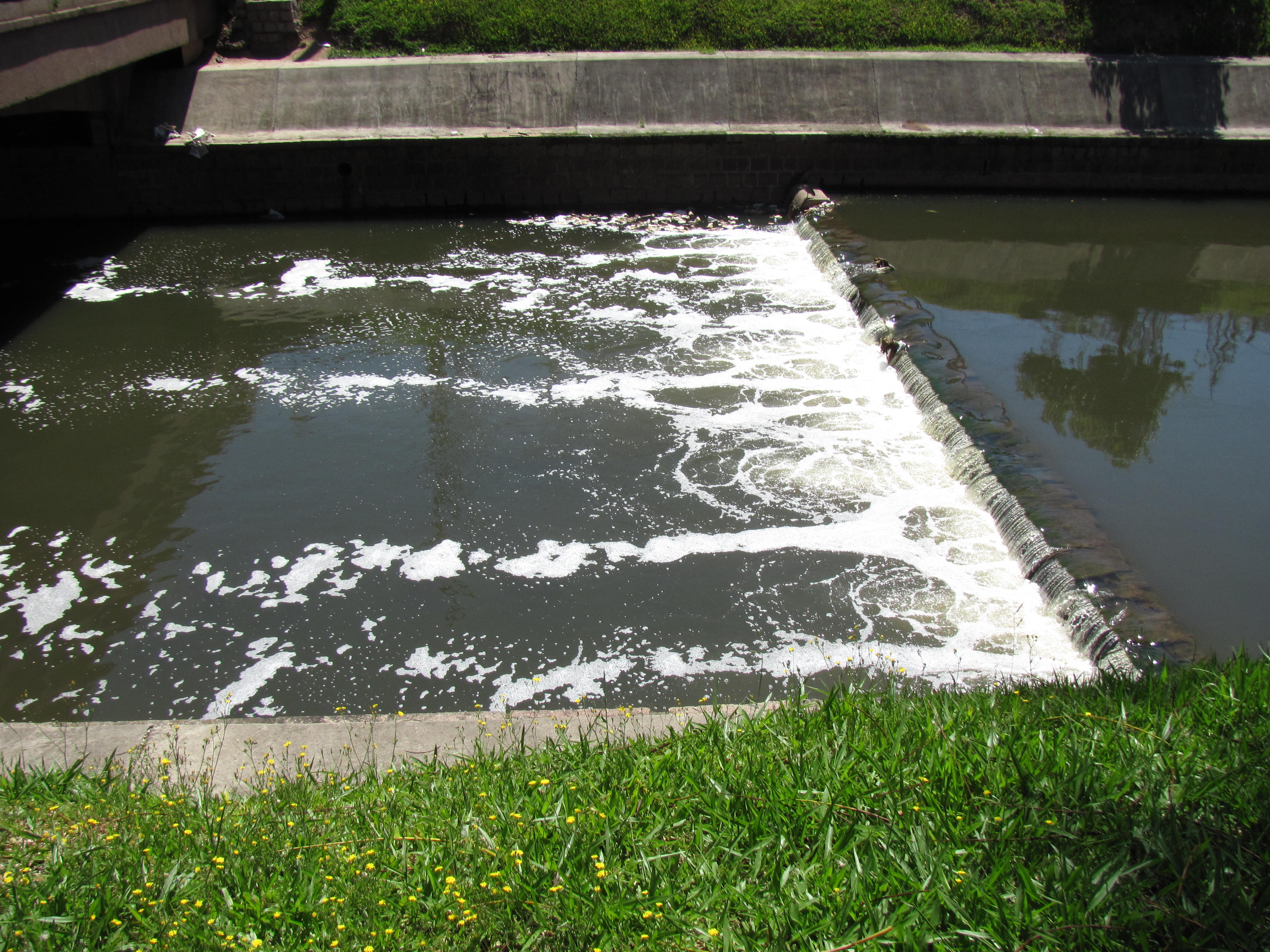
Pollution in the Arroio Dilúvio, which flows into the Guaíba lake.

Pollution has reached high levels in some places of the state, which ranks last in sewage treatment in all of Brazil. According to the most recent National Survey of Sanitation, in 2008, 85% of Rio Grande do Sul's municipalities did not treat their sewage. "The situation in Rio Grande do Sul is especially bad," as the executive president of the Trata Brasil Institute, Édison Carlos, stated in 2012. The government has promised major investments for the sector in the short term and some cities are developing important projects. Rivers in all regions are contaminated in various other ways, and in 2006 the number of fish that turned up dead was estimated at over eighty tons.

The Patos Lagoon is polluted by the industrial district of Rio Grande and receives water from a large watershed, whose rivers pass through major cities, including the capital. The Guaíba lake channels this water and discharges it into the lagoon, which thus receives various pollutants, among them oils, urban garbage, heavy metals, sewage, and pesticides. The problems are aggravated by silting, poorly sized impoundments, drainage, embankments, and disorderly occupation of the banks, leading, in the analysis of the National Water Agency, to a critical environmental situation.

This polluted water, besides being harmful to the fauna and flora, is the same water that is consumed by a large population of Porto Alegre and the metropolitan region. Although it undergoes treatment and the government assures that the water distributed is safe, it still has its drinkability compromised by the bad taste and bad smell, which generates complaints from consumers. In times of drought, the problem becomes worse. For Unisinos professor Marco Antonio Hansen, "the water companies perform real magic to leave the water in 'potable' conditions", considering the high pollution of the raw springs." In 2012, Porto Alegre obtained the worst result in a survey on water quality among sixteen of the largest Brazilian capitals, showing a high concentration of caffeine, a substance that indicates contamination by more than five hundred other chemical compounds potentially dangerous to human health, and which have no regulatory legislation. Air quality has been of concern in the capital and metropolitan region, in Caxias do Sul and in Rio Grande, caused by industry and the high number of circulating vehicles, although recently the state has carried out a diagnosis of the situation with a view to better management.

==== Global warming ====
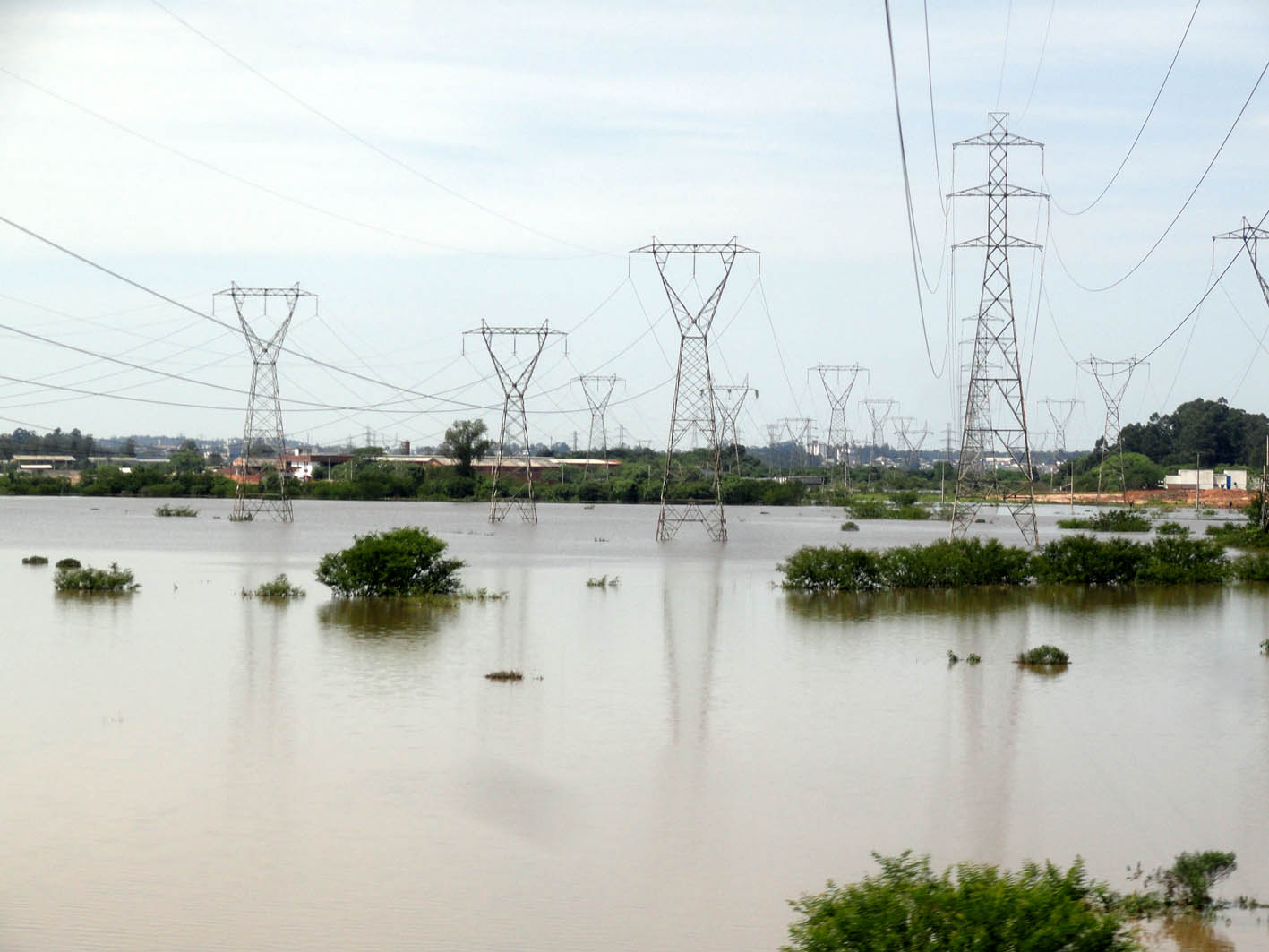
October 2015 floods in the São Leopoldo region, caused by a succession of days of torrential rains across the state, leading several rivers to overflow.

According to the projections of the First National Evaluation Report on Climate Change, prepared by the Brazilian Panel on Climate Change, by 2040, in the pampas region rainfall should intensify by 5% to 10% and the average temperature of the atmosphere should rise by up to 1 °C. By the end of the century the temperature is expected to increase by 2.5º to 3 °C, and rainfall is expected to be 25% to 30% more intense. Still unpredictable, but expected variations in the El Niño and La Niña phenomena, which have a great impact on the state climate, should add other conditioning factors of environmental change. There is a particular risk that episodes of torrential rains will become more intense and frequent, increasing the problem of periodic flooding that afflicts several regions of Rio Grande do Sul, and is likely to adversely affect productive systems. Sea level rise and coastal erosion are likely to affect coastal populations, causing displacements and destruction of man-made structures along the beaches, and increasing the risk in the face of storms.

According to Moacir Antonio Berlato, agro meteorologist at the Federal University of Rio Grande do Sul, an increase in the number of heat waves, a reduction in the number of days with severe frosts and a greater number of days with extreme temperatures have been observed; the number of consecutive days without rain is decreasing, the number of days with consecutive precipitation is increasing in all seasons, and the seasons are being de-characterized. Destructive storms, tornadoes, floods, and droughts are expected to increase in number and intensity. For Francisco Aquino, head of the Department of Geography at the same institution, the state is not prepared to handle climate catastrophe situations.

As the changes imposed on the climate by global warming are irregular, at the same time that the floods are getting worse, the worst droughts in history are being registered in the last years. In the last 50 years, the average temperature in the state increased by 0.6 °C. In the last two decades, out of every ten harvests, four are lost due to drought. In the drought of 2004/2005, the largest in the last 50 years, the loss was a record, reaching 3.64 billion reais, and 451 municipalities in the state went into a state of emergency or calamity. In 2014, Porto Alegre had the hottest summer in its history. Berlato states that "in agriculture, in the South Region, the increase in minimum temperature will certainly cause a reduction in the yield of crops such as maize and wheat. The increase in temperature will also harm or reduce the areas suitable for the so-called temperate climate crops that require cold, as is the case of some fruit trees (apple, peach)". Climate change also harms pollinating animals, such as bees and mammals, on which many crops, such as fruit trees and soybeans, depend. Droughts have also damaged water supply systems for human consumption.

Jefferson Cárdia Simões, a glaciologist, and professor at the Institute of Geosciences at UFRGS said that the incidence of endemic diseases is increasing significantly, such as dengue fever. The researcher states that an increase of 1.5 °C in the average temperature in Rio Grande do Sul would already be enough to include the state in the permanent endemic zone of the disease. Extreme heat waves make children and the elderly suffer, and floods seriously problematize sanitation issues, which in many places is in critical condition, being the origin of other diseases. Mental illnesses are also expected to increase in the population due to climate imbalance, such as stress and depression.

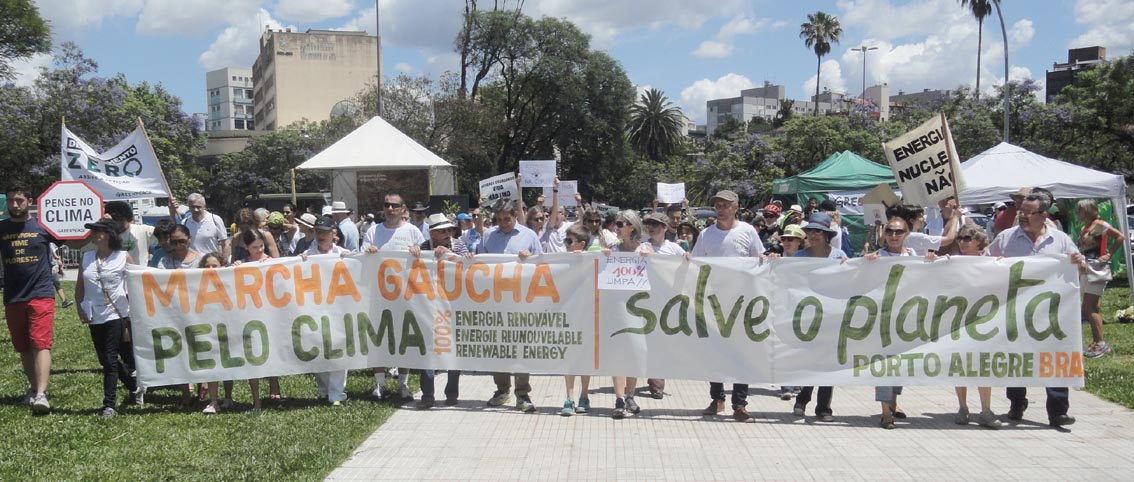
Climate March, Porto Alegre, 2015.

There are no specific state policies for the prevention and adaptation to global warming and the mitigation of its effects, although in 2015 Fepam launched the Cycle of Debates on Climate Change.

==== Threatened species ====
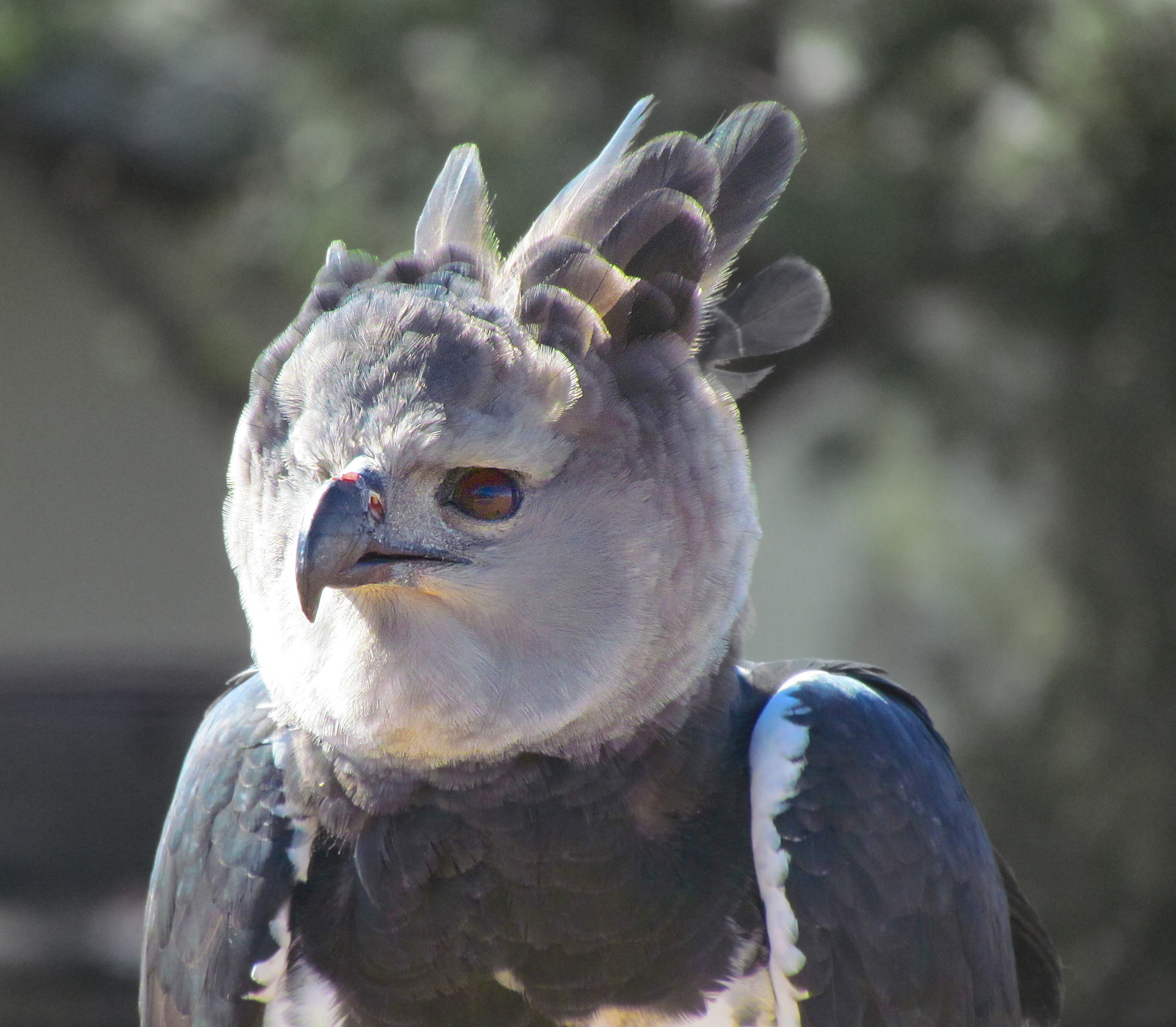
Exemplary of Harpia harpyja, a species probably extinct in the state.

All the imbalances and aggressions to the environment on the Rio Grande do Sul biodiversity. The government officially published in 2002 and 2003 an extensive list of endangered species, updated in 2014, Among the numerous species endemic to the state, several are also threatened, meaning that their disappearance will eradicate them on a global scale.

==== Political and institutional aspects ====
The state's institutional and political sectors concerning the environment have been in chronic crisis for many years, jeopardizing much of the fruits of Rio Grande do Sul's pioneerism in the environmental area. The lack of clear and consistent lines of action was reflected in the appointment of eight environment secretaries between 2002 and 2009 and the reduction of Rio Grande do Sul's role as a national reference in the area of environmental policies.

In 2012, the employees of Fepam, the state environmental protection foundation, "in Assembly of Crisis", publicly denounced the precarious state of the institution's operation: "we must bring the fact to the attention of society because the government is trying to stifle the gravity of the situation. [...] What shocks us is that the fact has practically no repercussions in society and the press in general. As if everything was working well. Or even worse, as if the system were dispensable." Among the difficulties faced, were the lack of vehicles to carry out field inspections, obsolete equipment, a significant reduction in the technical exchange with other states, the Federal Government, and international agencies, lack of qualified personnel, great pressure to speed up licensing processes, and the public discredit of the institution.

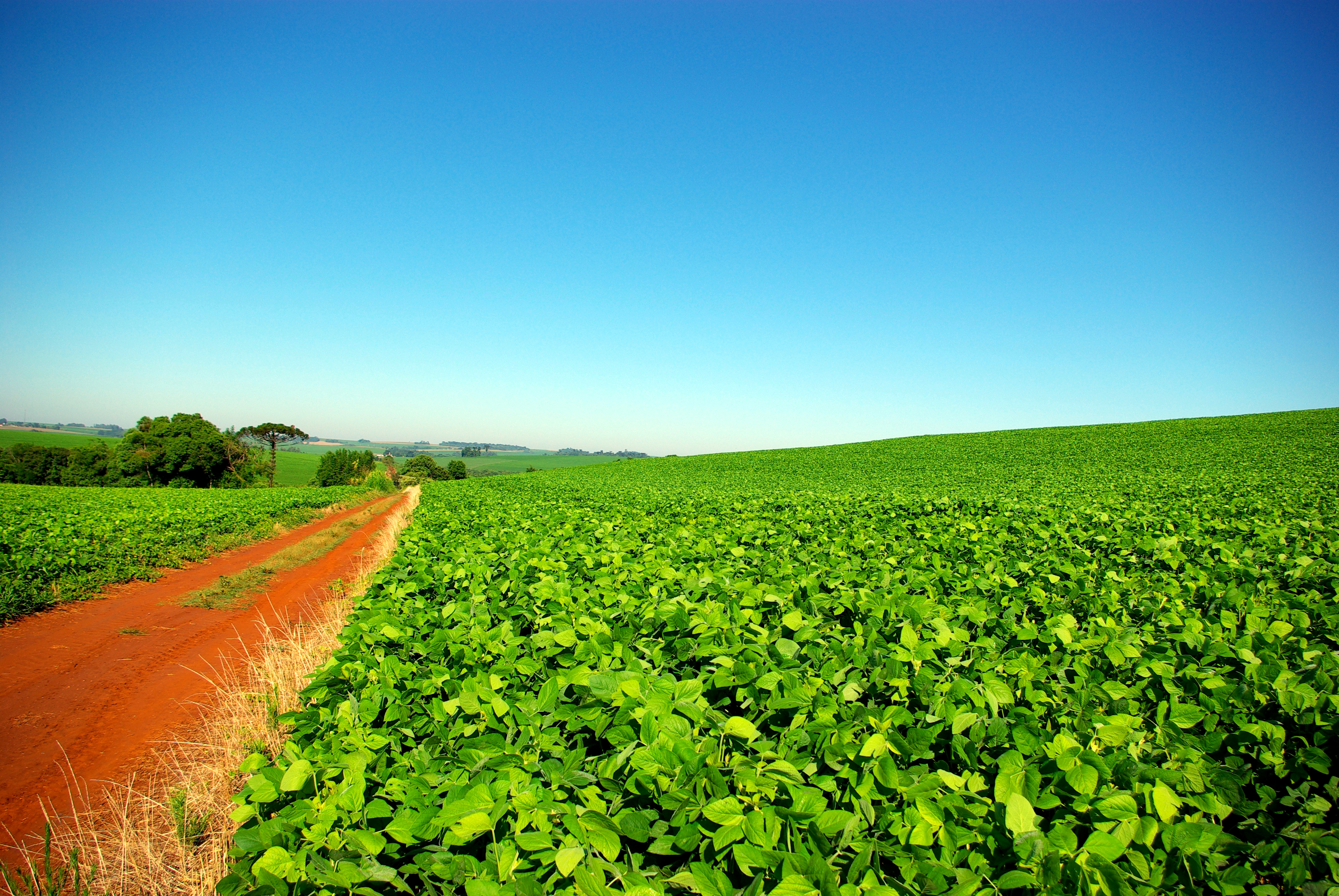
Large soybean plantation in the interior of the state.

The Permanent Assembly of Entities in Defense of the Environment of Rio Grande do Sul (Apedema/RS) joined Fepam's protests, forwarding to the governor a document condemning "the current situation of political and institutional crisis of the State Government's environmental administration". For the Assembly, the dismantling of the Secretariat of Environment was occurring, demonstrating "the absence of a political will by the government to keep open the main channel of technical and political society in the environmental area." It added:

"Unfortunately, after four decades of the emergence of the environmental paradigm, the current development project in the state of Rio Grande do Sul remains at the opposite of history, promoting an unsustainable and environmentally obsolete infrastructure, besides not bringing, in fact, a better quality of life to the citizens of Rio Grande do Sul. Thus, we see that investments continue to be made in an outdated energy matrix with high socio-environmental impact (mineral coal, hydroelectric plants); in an agricultural model that exports commodities (soy, rice, pulp, tobacco, etc.), based on the intensive use of pesticides and GMOs; in the primacy of the automotive sector that prioritizes the use of individual automobiles, associated with planned obsolescence, to the detriment of public transportation, among other problems."

In 2013, the crisis was aggravated when the Federal Police dismantled a large network of corruption that operated in the state, involving politicians, businessmen, technicians, and public officials, and that, through bribery, facilitated the environmental licensing of enterprises disregarding requirements provided by law, favoring especially real estate companies in Porto Alegre and the northern coast of Rio Grande do Sul, as well as mining projects.

José Ivo Sartori, governor sworn in in 2015, has signaled that the environment is an important aspect of his government's policy but stated that it is necessary to reconcile nature with economic growth, defending agribusiness, one of the biggest villains in the view of environmentalists but one of the main bases of the Rio Grande do Sul economy. A few months after taking office, he formalized the Rural Environmental Registry, a compulsory register of all rural properties, where their physical and environmental characteristics and use are described, and it is expected that this mechanism will improve monitoring, reduce bureaucracy, and help control aggressions against the environment.

In 2016, Bill 145 was passed, which changed the management of the State Environmental Fund and introduced changes in the conceptualization of native forest and forestry areas, generating protests and a lawsuit by several associations, pointing out unconstitutionality and accusing the government of hurting several competencies and procedures "consolidated for many years in the State environmental agencies," ignoring the restrictions of the Forestry Zoning and undermining the policy of recovery of degraded areas, potentially causing "irreparable damage to the environment." The choice of Environment Secretary, Ana Pellini, was another cause for apprehension and considered a disaster by nine environmental entities, who delivered a letter of protest, citing that when Pellini managed Fepam between 2007 and 2009 the courts received many complaints of irregularities in environmental licensing, and they feared "an avalanche of setbacks."

Also generating protests and concern was the declared intention to commercially exploit the 23 Conservation Units existing in the state, through concessions to the private sector. For Gabriel Ritter, director of the Department of Biodiversity of the Secretary of Environment, the protected areas "are being used very little". During the public hearing that debated the issue, Deputy Altemir Tortelli criticized the project:

"Perhaps the majority of the population is not aware of what is at stake, of the gravity of the pre-announcements that have been made by the Sartori government. This means the deconstruction of fundamental instruments for scientific research and the environment in the state. This is a mercantile strategy that threatens to throw a decades-long history into the trashcan."

Deputy Manuela d'Ávila pointed out the lack of information about Sartori's global policy for the environment: "We live in an environment of permanent suspense. We are not debating anything concrete, because so far we don't know what the government intends". The well-known environmentalist and former municipal secretary for the Environment of Porto Alegre, Caio Lustosa, was more incisive, warning that concessions of this kind are vetoed by the state constitution, and criticized the current secretary as completely inadequate for her position.

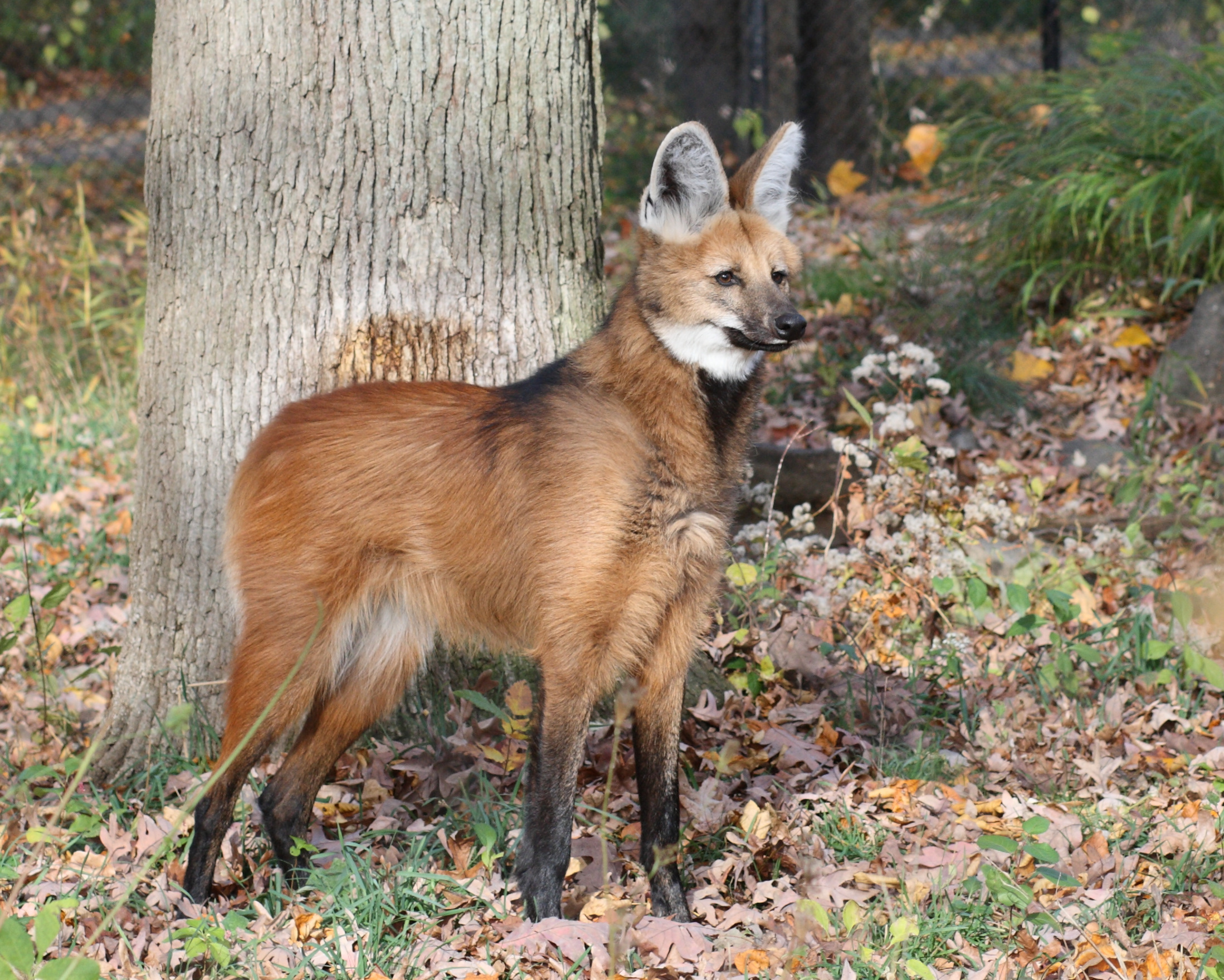
Maned wolf, critically endangered in the state

Also controversial was the extinction of the Zoobotanical Foundation of Rio Grande do Sul (FZB), as part of the plan to streamline the administrative machine to save resources. The Foundation was responsible for maintaining the Zoological Park of Rio Grande do Sul, the Natural Science Museum, and the Botanical Garden of Porto Alegre, which are important research centers and carried out important works. The Secretary of the Environment stated that the proposal was harmful to public interests. Representative Altemir Tortelli, of the group that disagrees with the extinction, said: "We cannot accept that the Piratini Palace (state government) simply put an end to an institution that is fundamental for scientific research and the preservation of biodiversity in Rio Grande do Sul. [...] The Sartori government wants, in thirty days, the Assembly to decide on the end of an institution that has more than 40 years of history, full of contributions to science and the environment. We will not accept this aberration." The extinction of the FZB was temporarily suspended by a determination of the State Court of Justice until the case is reassessed. Also in 2018, the governor issued a decree that weakened the legislation on pesticides, contested by the Permanent Assembly of Entities in Defense of the Environment of Rio Grande do Sul for removing the legal basis that existed to reject approval of products that do not have registration in the country where their active ingredient was synthesized.

Another measure that triggered controversy was the merger of the Secretary of Environment with the Secretary of Infrastructure in Eduardo Leite's government, which was criticized by Agapan as "a huge setback in the state's environmental management," mainly because of the conflict of interests between the two areas. The Gaúcho Institute for Environmental Studies stated that the state with this merger risks suffering an "environmental blackout," pointing out "a negative environmental picture neglected by several governments, especially the predecessor state government, where there were tremendous setbacks, via laws, decrees and ordinances with a profound weakening of the technical sector of the environmental area."

In 2020, Governor Leite had the Legislative Assembly approve a new wording for the State Environmental Code, changing 480 points of the previous legislation, virtually revoking it in its entirely, without going through the Health and Environment Commission and with only one public debate. Some of the changes were:

- The administration system of the protected areas was altered, creating a nebulous legal situation.
- The technical processes of environmental licensing were abolished, now allowing the self-licensing of the applicants by simple declaration, without going through any technical analysis.
- The rules for the management of the permanent preservation areas were left undefined.
- Prior environmental impact studies were dispensed with for state and municipal government enterprises.
- Various uses of the soil in the pampas were allowed without the need for authorization from the environmental agency.
- The state was released from its obligation to maintain germplasm banks.
- Companies that emit pollutants were released from their obligation to adopt control measures.

In addition, the new law revoked 13 articles of the Rio Grande do Sul Forest Code. The text received several criticisms for technical and legal errors, inconsistencies, and the great weakening of the protective legislation.

Although the current period presents difficulties deficiencies in many aspects regarding environmental protection, the government has carried out actions and implemented projects.The former governor, Tarso Genro, by word and deed, expressed his interest in the issue several times. The former state secretary of the Environment, Jussara Cony, a few months before the crisis at Fepam became public, had stated that the government is attuned to the environmental problems and was taking action. In order to improve the matter, education also requires further investments: According to biologist Sidney Grippi, "there can be no environmental conservation or preservation without education, as it builds in the individual and in the collectivity an awareness of changing behavior and attitudes, which aim to prioritize the environment." For researchers Scheren & Ferreira, the change of socio-cultural-environmental paradigms "is just a matter of education.... the population is receptive to the new environmental policy, requiring only work and investment in the area."

== Bibliography ==
- Agência Nacional de Águas (ANA). Bacias Hidrográficas do Atlântico Sul - Trecho Sudeste - Rio Grande do Sul (in Portuguese).
- Buckup, Ludwig (1999). "A Fauna e as Paisagens do Rio Grande do Sul na Visão dos Viajantes Alemães do Século XIX". In Rohden, Valério (ed.). Retratos de cooperação científica e cultural: 40 anos do Instituto Cultural Brasileiro-Alemão (in Portuguese). EDIPUCRS.
- Furriela, Rachel Biderman (2002). Democracia, cidadania e proteção do meio ambiente (in Portuguese). Annablume. p. 156.
- Jacobi, Pedro Roberto (2006). Gestão compartilhada dos resíduos sólidos no Brasil: inovação com inclusão social (in Portuguese). Annablume.
- Marcondes, Sandra (2005). Brasil, amor à primeira vista!: viagem ambiental no Brasil do século XVI ao XXI (in Portuguese). Editora Peirópolis.
- Silva, Maria Cristina Viñas Gomes da (2002). "Imprensa e Educação Ambiental: um estudo sobre a contribuição do jornal". In Dornelles, Beatriz (ed.). Mídia, imprensa e as novas tecnologias (in Portuguese). EDIPUCRS.
- Urban, Teresa (2001). Missão (quase) impossível: aventuras e desventuras do movimento ambientalista no Brasil (in Portuguese). Editora Peirópolis.
