= Torres State Park =

Torres State Park may refer to:

- Guarita State Park, a state park in Torres, Rio Grande do Sul, Brazil
- Itapeva State Park, a state park in Torres, Rio Grande do Sul, Brazil
