= Museu de Ciências Naturais da Fundação Zoobotânica do Rio Grande do Sul =

Museum of Natural Sciences
- Museu de Ciências Naturais da Fundação Zoobotânica do Rio Grande do Sul
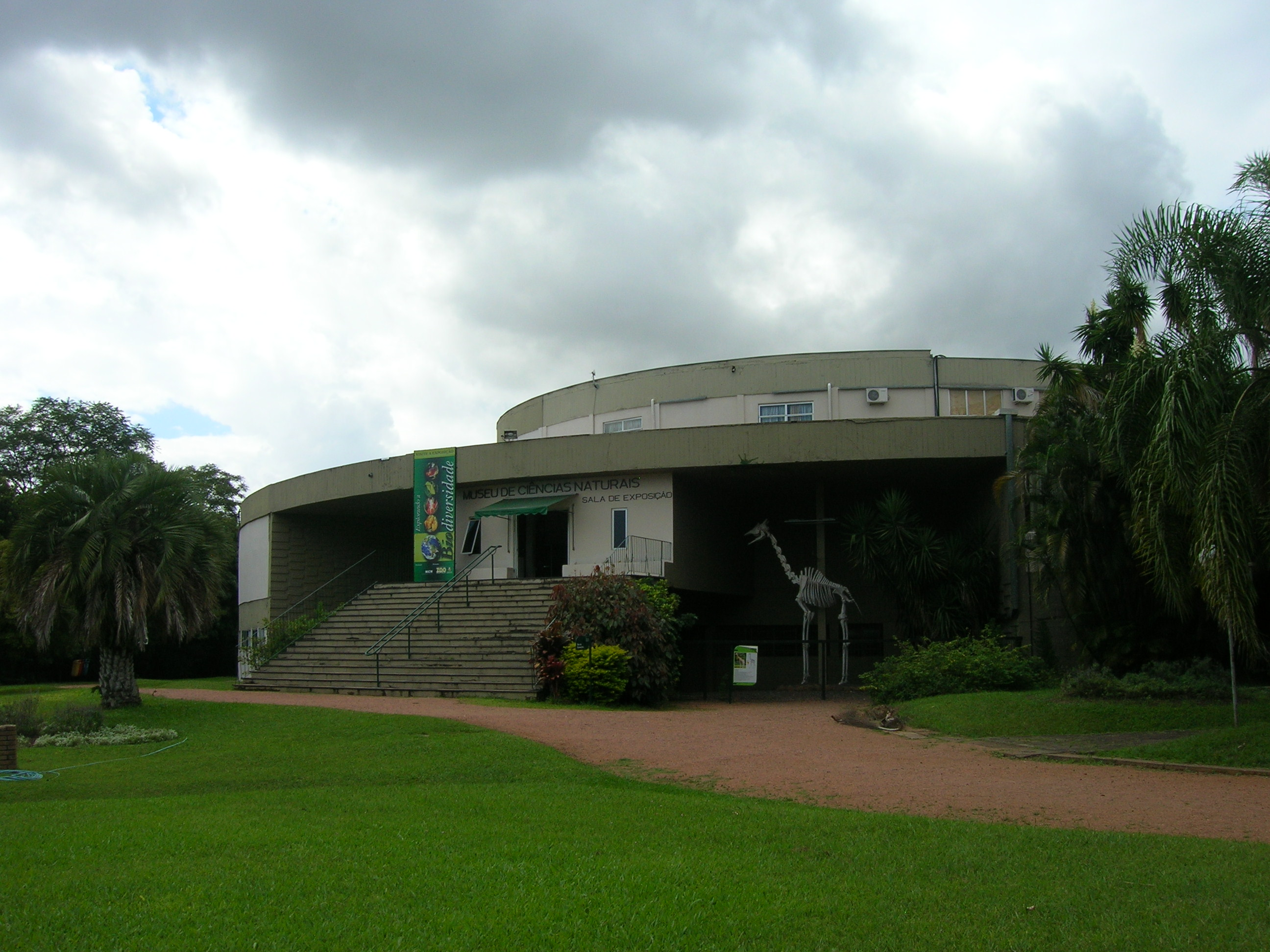
- Established: 1954
- Location: Rua Salvador França 1427. Porto Alegre, Rio Grande do Sul, Brazil
- Coordinates: 30°03′06″S 51°10′38″W
- Type: Paleontology, Natural history museum.
- Website: http://www.fzb.rs.gov.br/museu/

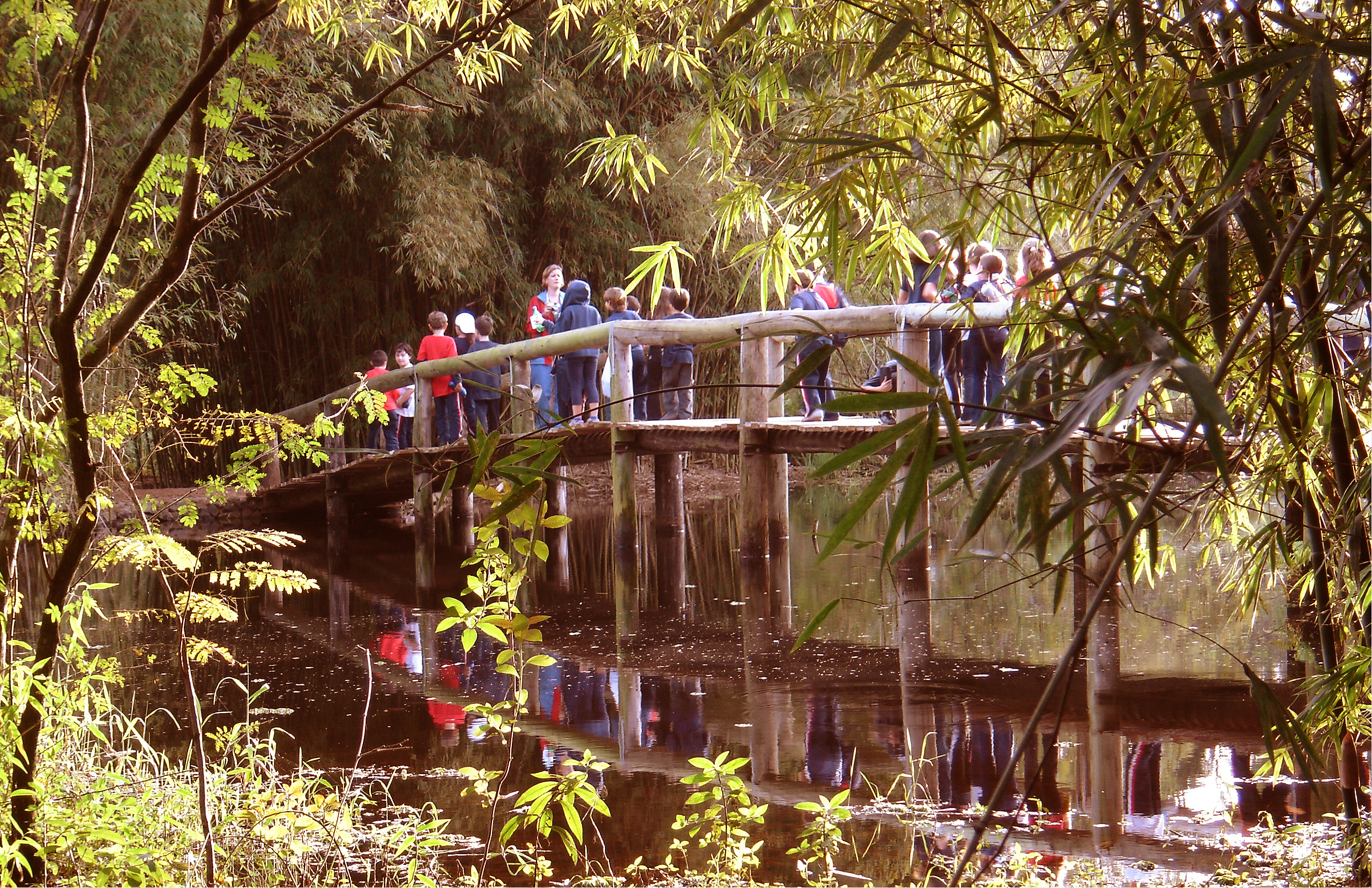
Porto Alegre Botanical Garden

Museu de Ciências Naturais da Fundação Zoobotânica do Rio Grande do Sul ('Museum of Natural Sciences of the Rio Grande do Sul Zoobotanical Foundation') is a Brazilian museum located inside the Porto Alegre Botanical Garden. It emerged in 1954 from the breakup of a natural history collection of the Júlio de Castilhos Museum.

The permanent exhibition showcases the richness of species native to Rio Grande do Sul, both flora and fauna. The show is organized in an evolutionary sequence: plant today, groups of animals and paleontological showcases. In this way, it shows the characteristic fauna of various ecosystems of the state: swamp, field and forest.
