= Fazal Bhambro railway station =

Railway station in Pakistan

Fazal Bhambro railway station فضل ڀنڀرو ريلوي اسٽيشن

General information
- Owner: Ministry of Railways

Other information
- Station code: FZB

History
- Former names: Great Indian Peninsula Railway

Fazal Bhambro railway station (Urdu: فضل بھمبرو ریلوے اسٹیشن, Sindhi: فضل ڀنڀرو ريلوي اسٽيشن) is located in Pakistan.

== See also ==
- List of railway stations in Pakistan
- Pakistan Railways
