= Porto Alegre Botanical Garden =

Garden in Porto Alegre, Brazil

Coordinates: 30°03′06″S 51°10′38″W

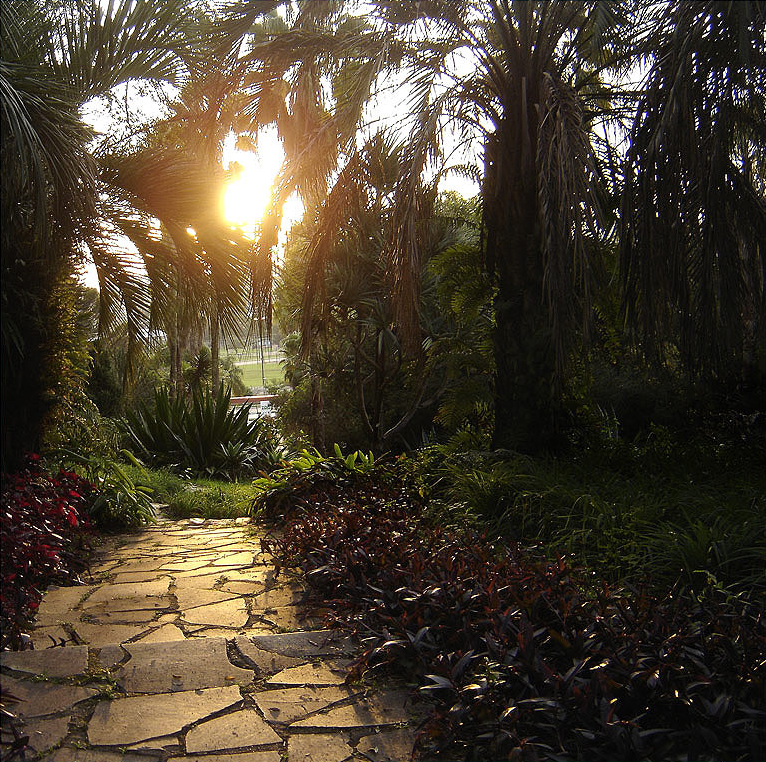
At the entrance of the Botanical Garden.

The Porto Alegre Botanical Garden (Jardim Botânico de Porto Alegre) is a Foundation of Rio Grande do Sul located on the street Salvador França, in Porto Alegre, Brazil.

== History ==
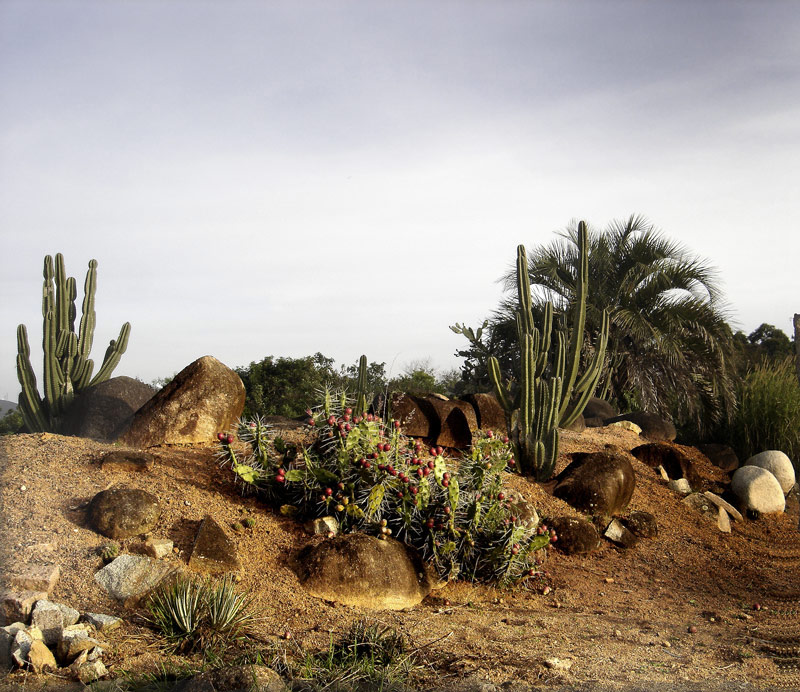
Area of cactus

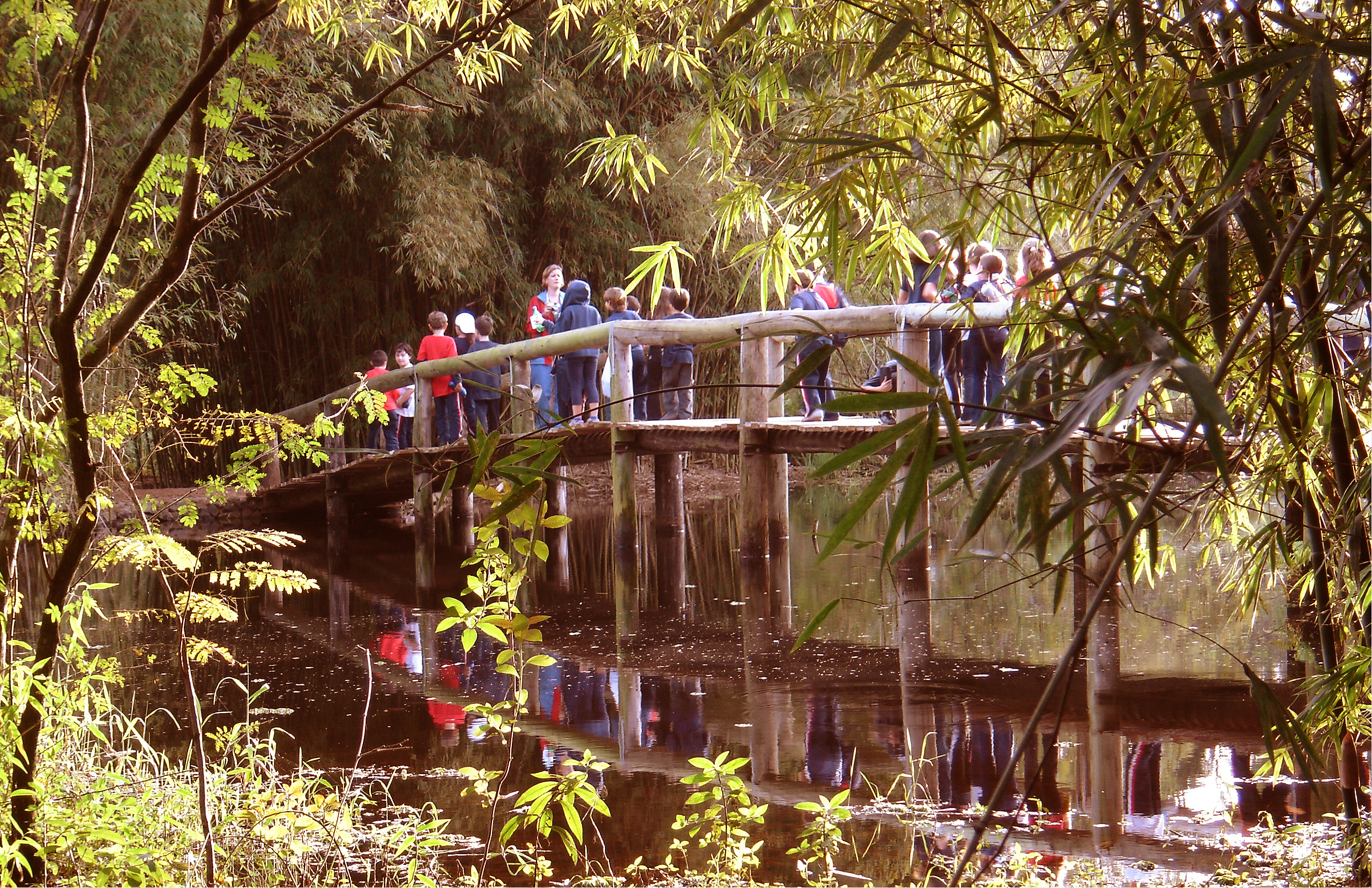
Education at the Porto Alegre Botanical Garden

The project for a botanical garden in Porto Alegre dates back to the beginning of the 19th century, when Dom Joao VI, after creating the Rio de Janeiro Botanical Garden, sent seedlings to Porto Alegre to establish another similar park in the city. Unfortunately these seedlings did not come to the capital, remaining trapped in Rio Grande, where they were planted. The agriculturist Paul Schoenwald subsequently donated a plot of land to the state government to establish a green area, but the project was unsuccessful.

A third attempt would be made in 1882, when councilman Francisco Pinto de Souza presented a proposal for scientific exploitation of the area then known as the Várzea de Petrópolis, providing a garden and a promenade. Considered utopian, the plan was terminated and lay dormant for decades, only returning to consideration in the mid-20th century.

In 1953 the 2136 law authorized the selling of an area of 81.57 hectares, of which 50 hectares would be to create a park or botanical garden. A committee, which included prominent teacher and religious figure Teodoro Luís, was formed to develop the project, which began in 1957 with the first planting of selected species: a collection of palm trees, conifers and succulent. When opened to the public on September 10, 1958, it already featured nearly 600 species.

Soon after, in 1962, was inaugurated the oven for cacti, in the 1970s and the botanical garden was integrated into Fundação Zoobotânica Foundation, along with the Park Zoo and the Museum of Natural Sciences. This season began the collection of trees, with emphasis on families of ecological importance (Myrtaceae, Rutaceae, Myrsinaceae, Bignoniaceae, Fabales, Zingiberales, among others), thematic groups (condiments and scented) and forest formations typical of the state, and is launched a program for expeditions to collect specimens and seeds.

A project linked to the Program Pro-Guaíba allowed in the 1990s an improvement in the infrastructure of the Botanical Garden, where nurseries were built for bromeliads, orchids, succulent, vines and cacti, and reforms have taken place in the center of visitors and the administration, beyond the creation of a seed bank.

== Paleontology ==
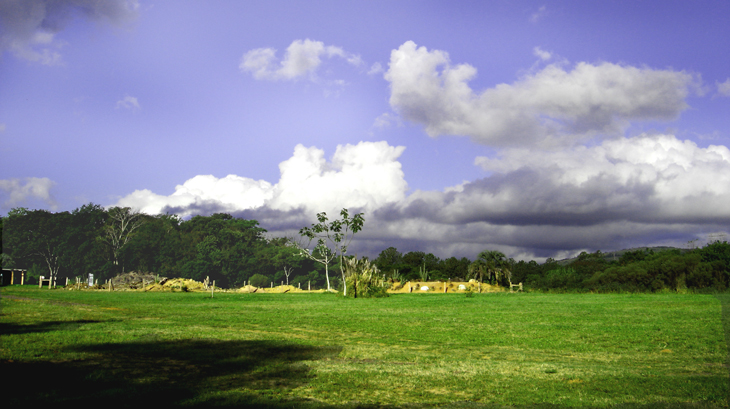
Lawn

At the Museum of Natural Sciences, which is located inside the Porto Alegre Botanical Garden, there is an exhibition of fossils found in geopark of paleorrota, as well as contributing to publications on the subject.
