= Guarita State Park =

State park in Rio Grande do Sul, Brazil

- Parque Estadual da Guarita
- IUCN category II (national park)
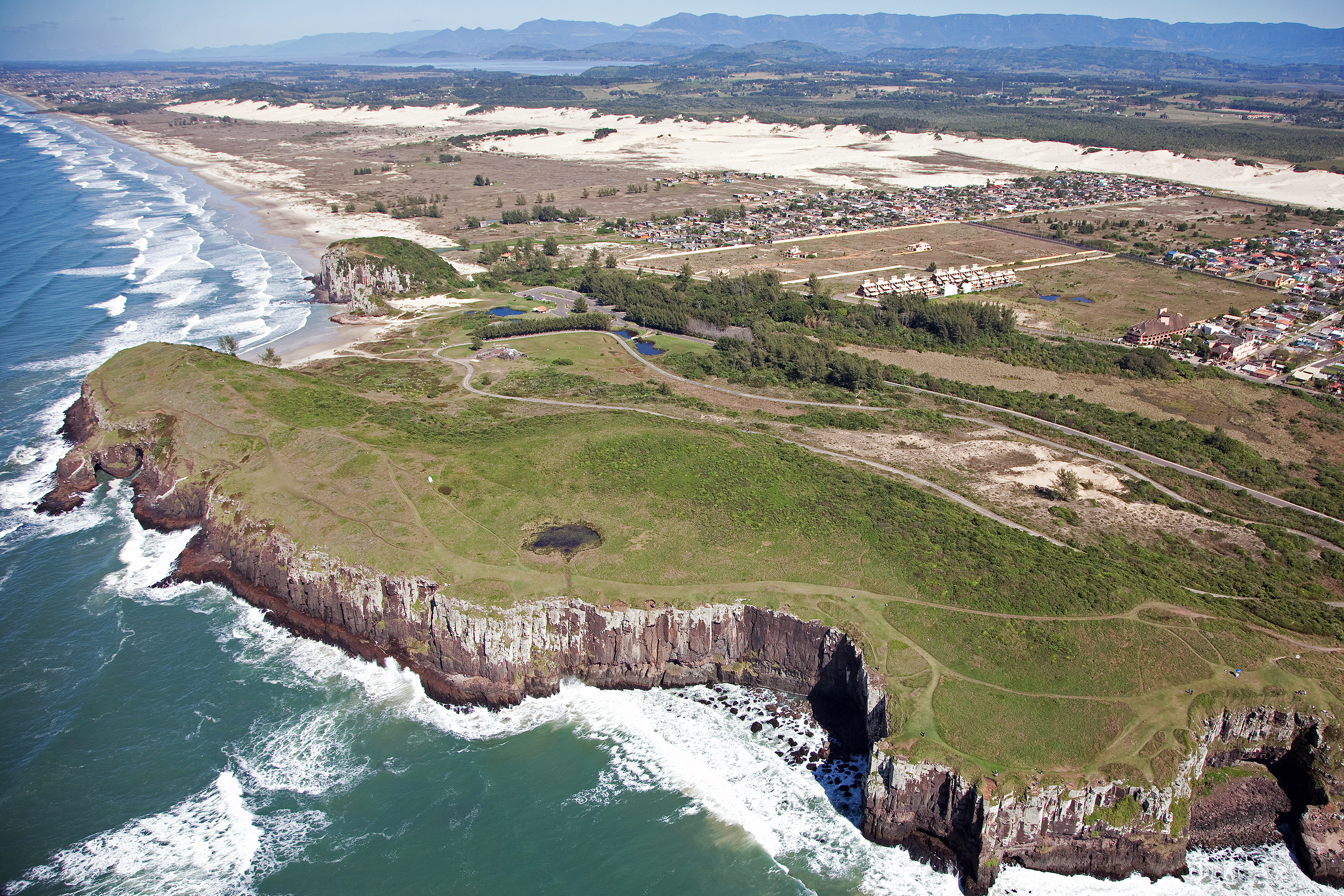
- View from the air. The Itapeva State Park is in the background

- Location within Brazil
- Nearest city: Torres, Rio Grande do Sul
- Coordinates: 29.354682°S 49.732786°W
- Designation: State park
- Created: 1971
- Administrator: Secretaria Municipal do Meio Ambiente e Urbanismo

The Guarita State Park (Portuguese: Parque Estadual da Guarita), officially the Parque Estadual José Lutzenberger, is a state park in the state of Rio Grande do Sul, Brazil. It protects a promontory on the South Atlantic Ocean.

== Location ==
The Guarita State Park is in the municipality of Torres, Rio Grande do Sul, on top of the Torres promontory, the only place in the state where the mountains come down to the sea.

The town of Torres is named after the "towers", or cliffs of volcanic origin, along the sea shore. There are three large rock formations: the Morro do Farol to the north, then the Morro das Furnas and the Morro da Guarita. The last two are in the state park. The rock formations are between 200 and 180 million years old, formed before South America split from Africa, and corresponding to Entedeka in Namibia. The lower layer is rosy sandstone of the Botucatu formation and the upper part is basalt blocks of the Serra Geral Formation.

== History ==
The Guarita State Park was created in 1971 to protect a geological formation of great scenic and environmental value. It is also important economically, since it receives about 30,000 visitors annually. At first the park was administered by the state agency SETUR/RS. From 1996 it has been administered by the Municipal Secretariat for the Environment and Urbanism through a concession of use. The change in name to Parque Estadual José Lutzenberger was approved in January 2003, in recognition of the effort made by the environmentalist José Lutzenberger to have the park created, and to define and design the park.

== Sources ==
- Aguiar, João Batista Santafé (October–November 1996), "Municipalização do Parque da Guarita", AgirAzul (in Portuguese)
- Bassa, Luana G. (2016), Parque Estadual José Lutzenberger: Um museu a céu aberto (PDF)
- Giusti, Benito (7 January 2003), Rigotto aprova nome de Lutzenberger para o Parque Estadual da Guarita (in Portuguese), Assembleia Legislativa do Rio Grande do Sul - Agência de Notícias, archived from the original on 3 March 2016
- Parque da Guarita (in Portuguese), Municipality of Torres
