= Climate change in Brazil =

Emissions, impacts and responses of Brazil related to climate change

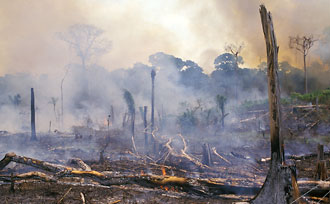
Forest fires are both a consequence and a cause of climate change.

Climate change in Brazil is causing higher temperatures and longer-lasting heatwaves, changing precipitation patterns, more intense wildfires and heightened fire risk. Brazil's hydropower, agriculture and urban water supplies will be affected. Brazil's rainforests, and the Amazon, are particularly at risk to climate change. At worst, large areas of the Amazon River basin could turn into savannah, with severe consequences for global climate and local livelihoods. Sea levels in Brazil are predicted to rise by more than 20 cm (0.66 ft) by the middle of the century. Extreme weather events like droughts, flash floods, and urban flooding are causing annual losses of around R$13 billion (US$2.6 billion), equivalent to 0.1% of the country’s 2022 GDP. Climate impacts could exacerbate poverty.

Brazil's greenhouse gas emissions per person are higher than the global average, and Brazil is among the top 10 highest emitting countries. Greenhouse gas emissions by Brazil are over 4% of the annual world total, firstly due to cutting down trees in the Amazon rainforest, which emitted more carbon dioxide in the 2010s than it absorbed, and secondly from large cattle farms, where cows belch methane.

In the Paris Agreement, Brazil promised to reduce its emissions, but the 2019-2022 Bolsonaro government has been criticized for doing too little to limit or adapt to climate change. In 2024 Brazil revised its Nationally Determined Contribution (NDC), setting a goal to cut emissions by 59% to 67% compared to 2005 levels by 2035.

== Greenhouse gas emissions ==
Since 1850, Brazil trails only the United States, China and Russia in cumulative contributions of greenhouse gases.

Brazil is among the countries emitting the most greenhouse gases overall, and also among the most emissions per person.

Brazil's 2023 greenhouse gas emissions are estimated at 2.38 billion tonnes of CO_{2} equivalent, over 4% of the global total emissions. This makes Brazil the 6th highest emitting nation in 2023. Brazilians emit around 11 tonnes per person, compared to a global average of about 5 tonnes per person. As of 2021, Brazil is the 4th heaviest cumulative emitter at 110 Gt.

In 2020, official figures were reported for 2016: agriculture 33.2%, energy sector 28.9%, land use, land-use change, and forestry (LULUCF) 27.1%. Industrial Processes and Product Use (IPPU) and waste contributed 6.4% and 4.5%, respectively.

According to the Brazilian Climate Observatory, the country emitted 2.17 billion gross tons of carbon dioxide equivalent (tCO_{2}e) in 2019. Deforestation accounted for 968 million tCO_{2}e, which was 44% of the total, agriculture emitted 598.7 million tCO_{2}e (28%) and the energy sector 413.6 million tCO_{2}e (19%), industry 99 million tCO_{2}e (5%) and waste 96 million tCO_{2}e (4%).

Although the government has pledged net zero emissions by 2050, critics complain that immediate action is not being taken. Researcher Emilio La Rovere, one of the coordinators of a report from 2013, said: "if nothing is done to restrict post-2020 emissions, Brazil may emit 2.5 billion tons of carbon dioxide as early as 2030. To give you an idea, the number exceeds the total for 2005, when emissions totaled around 2 billion tons." In 2024 Brazil revised its Nationally Determined Contribution (NDC), setting a goal to cut emissions by 59% to 67% compared to 2005 levels by 2035.

=== Agriculture ===
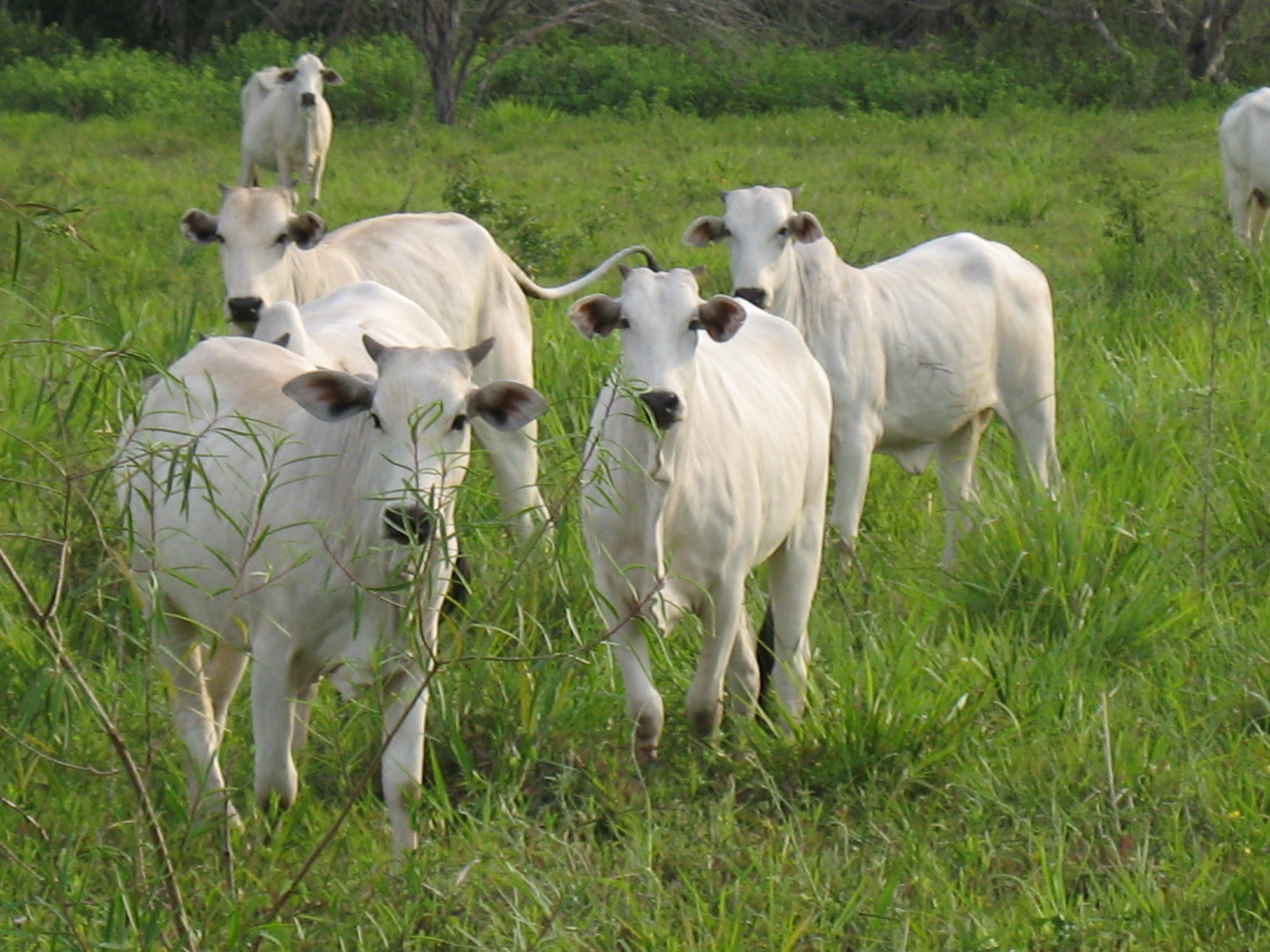
Belches after enteric fermentation contain methane, and manure management may emit methane and nitrous oxide

==== Cattle ====
In 2012, Brazil had the second largest number of cattle in the world, with 205 million head. Cows are ruminants that emit greenhouse gases such as methane and nitrous oxide.

=== Deforestation ===
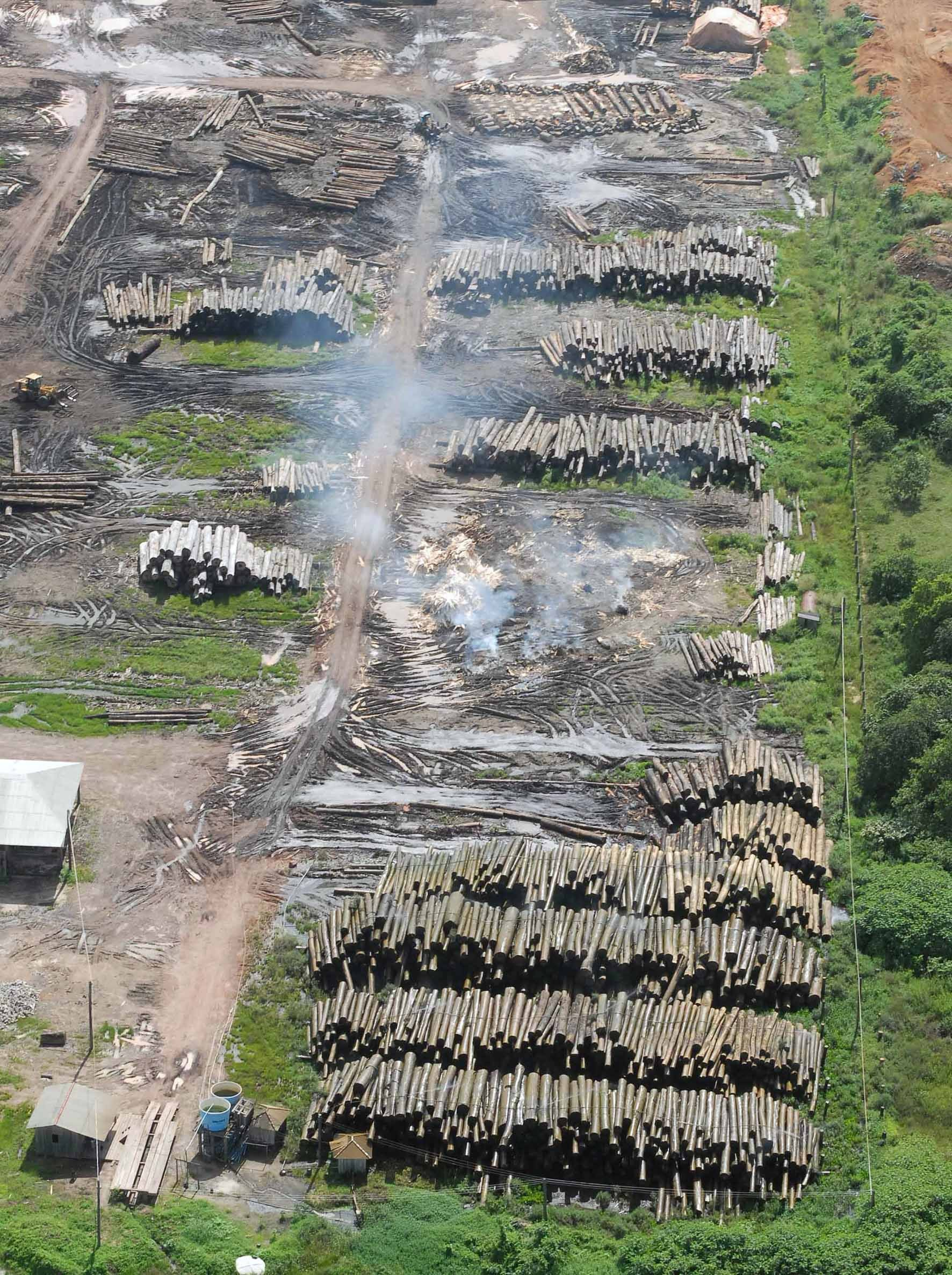
Wood from illegal deforestation

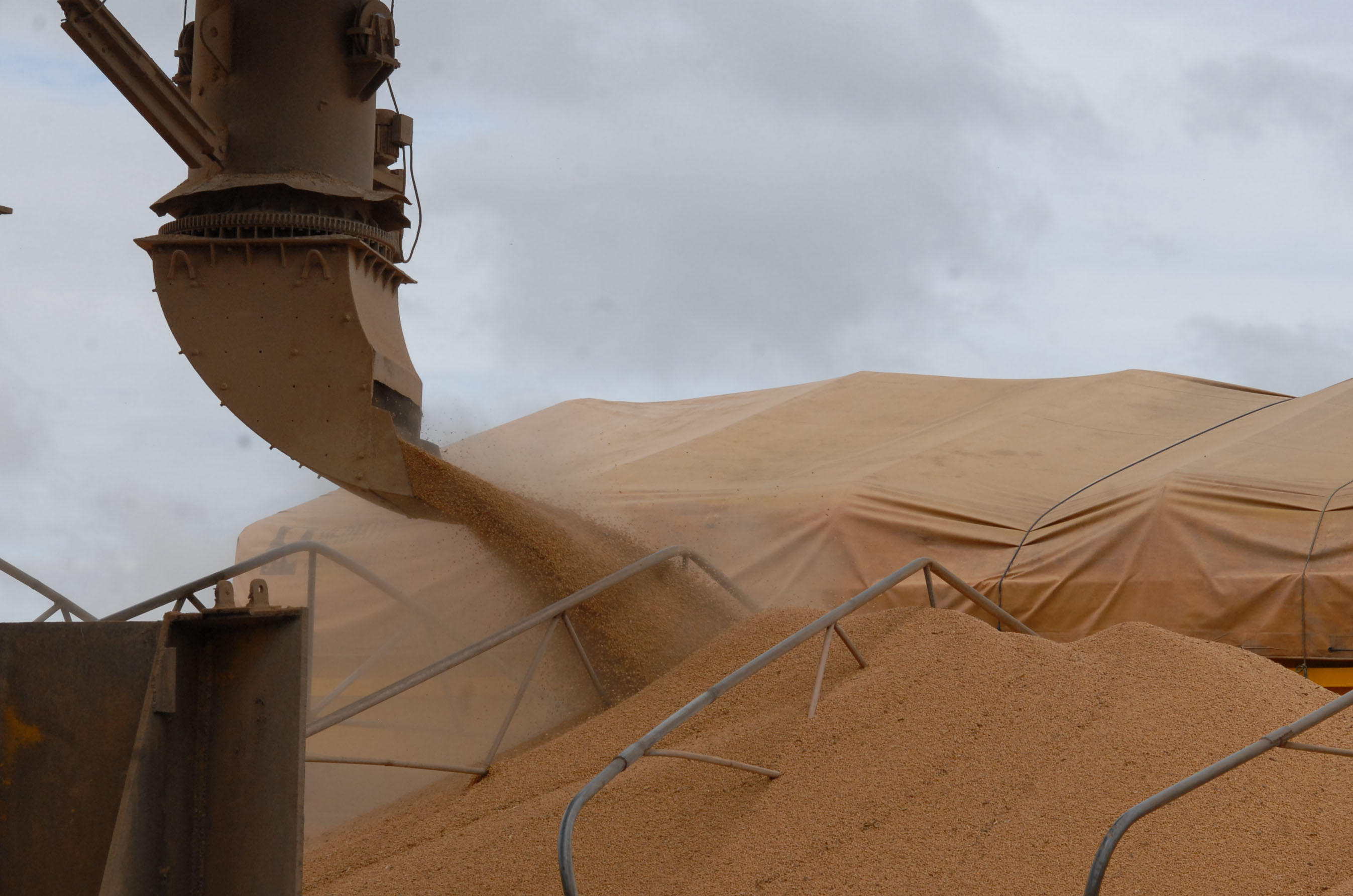
Pressure from international agribusiness is estimated to have reduced deforestation for soya fields

Trees are cut down to create fields for cattle and soya. Deforestation peaked in 2004, then decreased until the early 2010s. Since then, deforestation has tended to increase through 2020.

=== Fossil fuels ===
The largest single emitter in the energy sector is oil products used as fuel for transport in Brazil, but some natural gas and coal is burnt by the electricity sector in Brazil. In 2016/17, coal-fired power stations in Brazil received over 1 billion reals in subsidies. In the Convention on Biological Diversity, Brazil committed to phasing out environmentally harmful subsidies by 2020, but the government said in 2022 that coal power would be subsidized until 2040.

== Impacts on the natural environment ==
=== Temperature and weather changes ===
Köppen climate classification map for Brazil for 1980–2016

2071–2100 map under the most intense climate change scenario. Mid-range scenarios are currently considered more likely

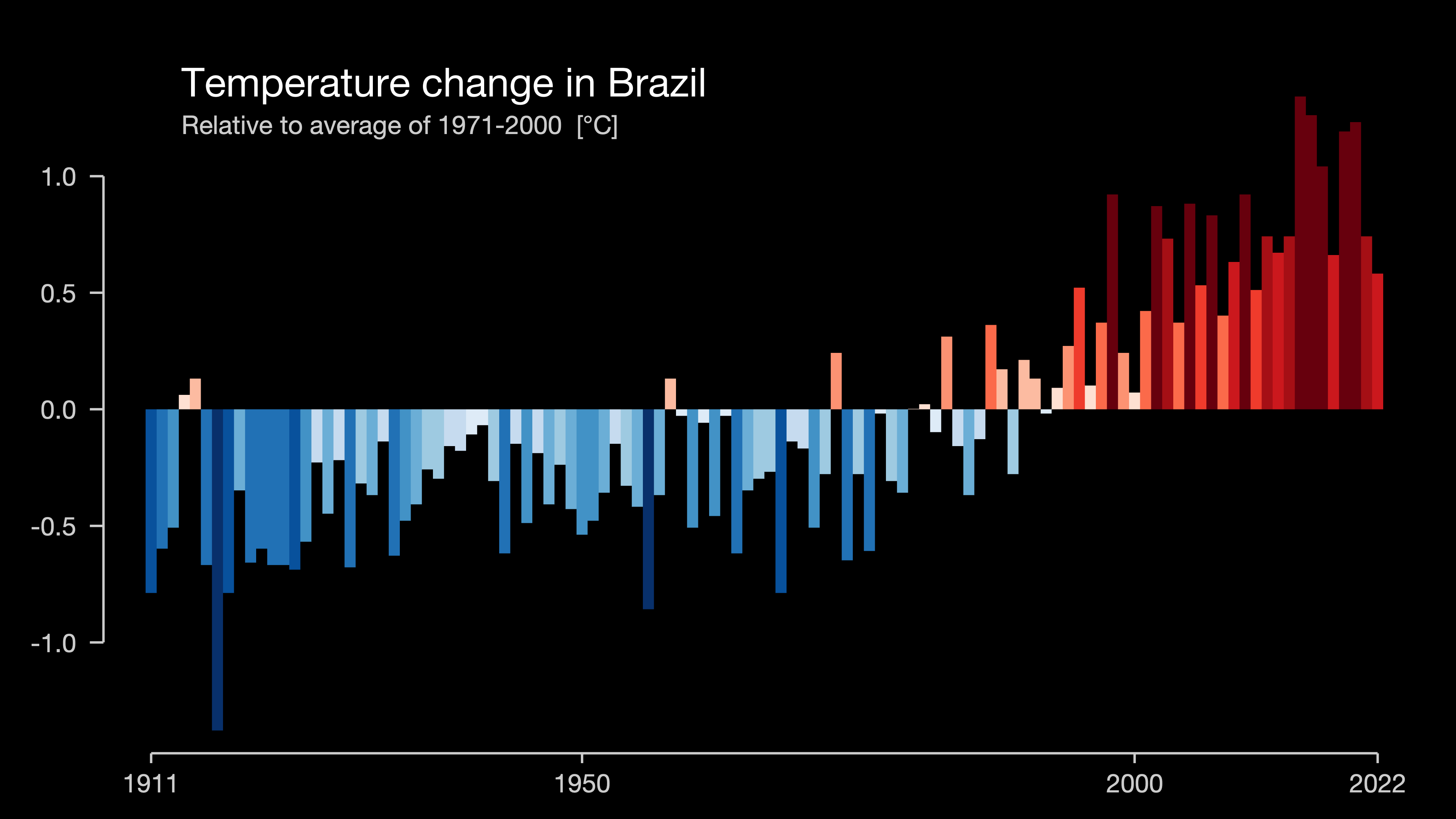
Temperature change in Brazil, each bar represents the average temperature over that year.

According to José Marengo, of the National Institute for Space Research, recent studies show that, with the exception of stretches of the coast of Chile where there has been a slight cooling in recent decades, in all other areas of South America forecasts indicate an increase in temperature.

The Amazon has a prominent role in regulating the climate throughout Brazil and other regions in South America. Its forest is a major carbon sink and is essential for the formation of the rains that irrigate much of the country. According to Marengo et al., 30% to 50% of the rainfall in the Amazon Basin originates in the forest itself through evaporation. "In addition, the humidity originated in the Amazon Basin is carried by the winds to other parts of the continent and is considered important in the formation of precipitation in regions distant from the Amazon itself." Naturally, if the forest disappears, the rains will disappear. A vicious circle is created in which if deforestation exceeds a certain critical level, estimated at losses of 40%, the forest will be unable to generate enough rain to maintain itself: the less forest, the less precipitation, and the less precipitation, the less forest. About 19% of the Amazon forest has already been lost, and recent studies indicate that it is close to passing the critical point, beyond which its degradation will become irreversible. In addition to the problems in the Amazon, all other national biomes – the Cerrado, the Semi-Arid, the Pantanal, the Atlantic Forest and the Pampa – also suffer important effects, most of them with an increasing tendency, contributing to amplify the cascading effects.

Another important part of the Brazilian rains comes from the circulation of ocean moisture. Global warming also has an impact on ocean currents that influence the Brazilian climate, and the winds that carry the humidity that reaches Brazil are having their patterns modified, with the effect of reducing the level of atmospheric humidity and disturbing the formation of clouds, reducing precipitation. Reducing rainfall, in turn, can dry underground aquifers. These combined factors mean, in total, a generalized reduction in the availability of water and drier environments in most of the nation. In some regions, however, due to different mechanisms, rainfall is expected to increase, also bringing adverse effects. According to the PBMC, "the change with the greatest impact will be a change in rainfall patterns. Research shows that in the south and southeast, regions that suffer from floods and landslides, rains will become stronger and more frequent. In the northeast, the trend is the opposite.

==== Projections of the First National Assessment Report on Climate Change (2012) ====
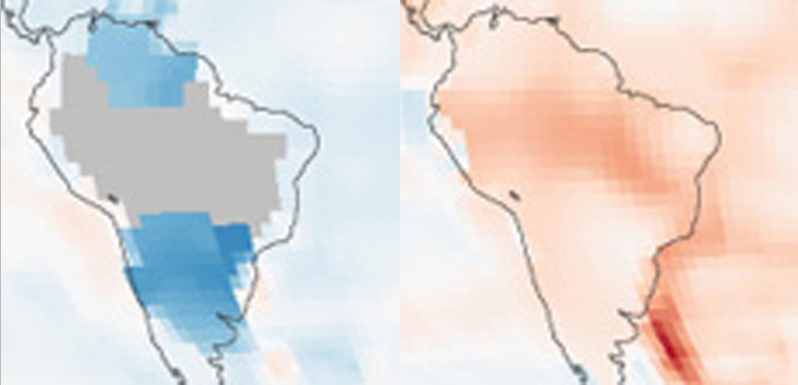
Temperatures in the 1880s and 1980s, compared to the average between 1951 and 1980. The interior of Brazil does not have much data available in the 19th century, generating more uncertainty, but in the areas covered by measurements the differences are very visible. The graph is an extract of a global estimate produced by NASA.

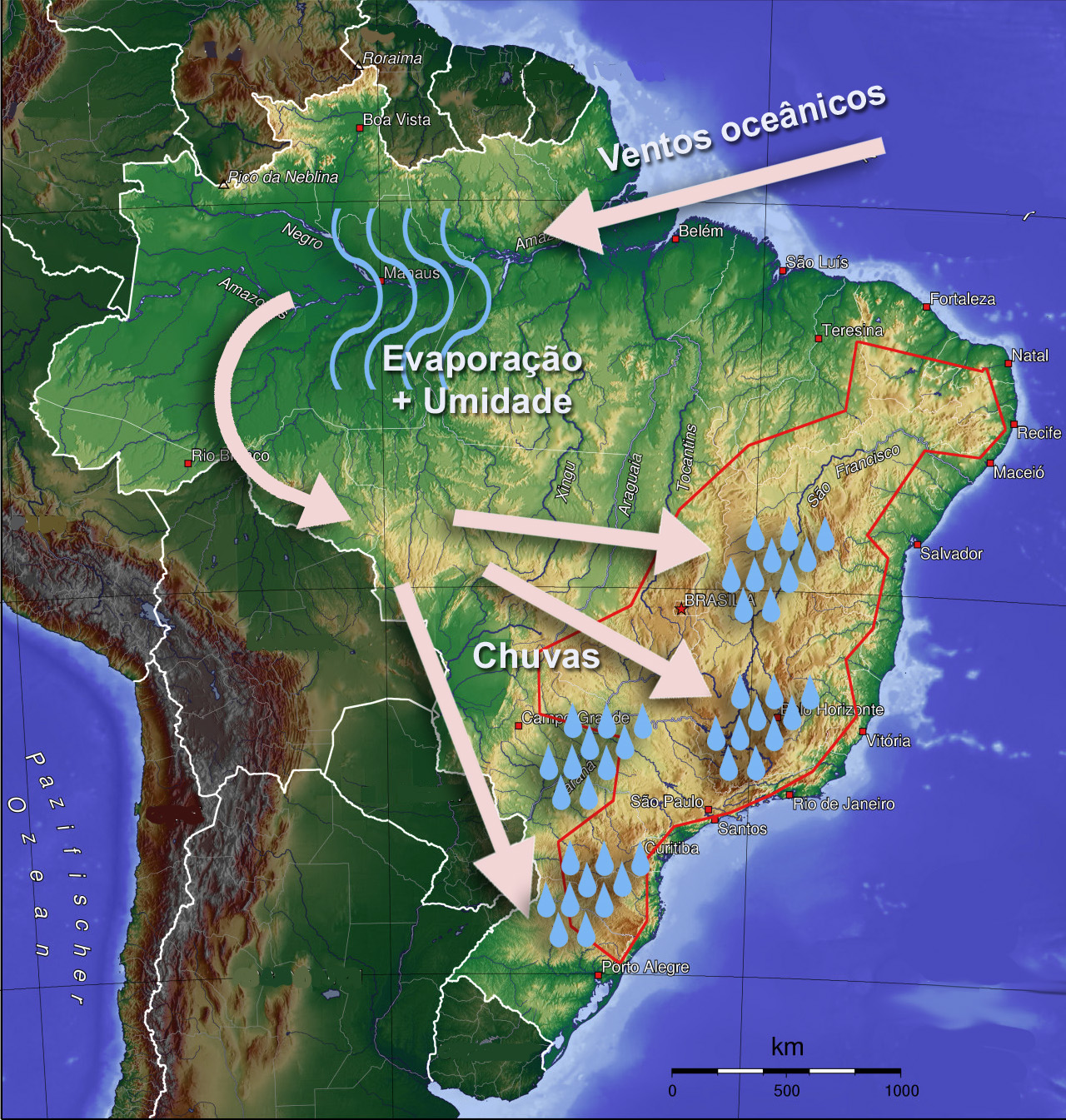
Wind circulation and rain production through the Amazon rainforest. Ocean winds penetrate the Amazon, are impregnated with moisture produced by the forest through evaporation, and this moisture is discharged as rain in several regions of Brazil and other South American countries.

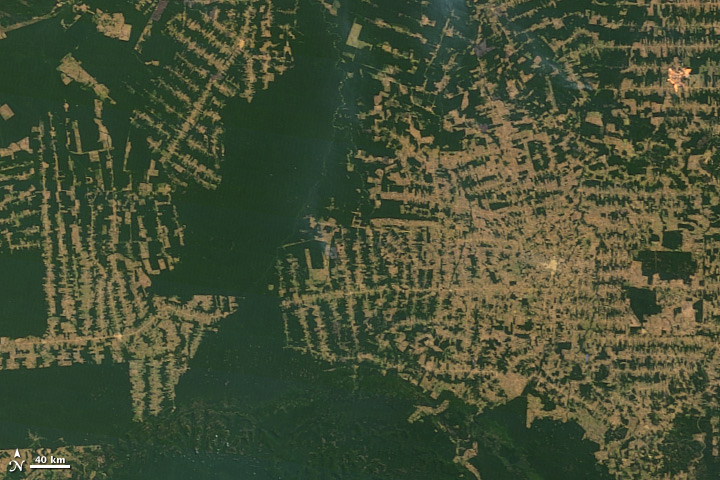
Deforestation in Rondônia.

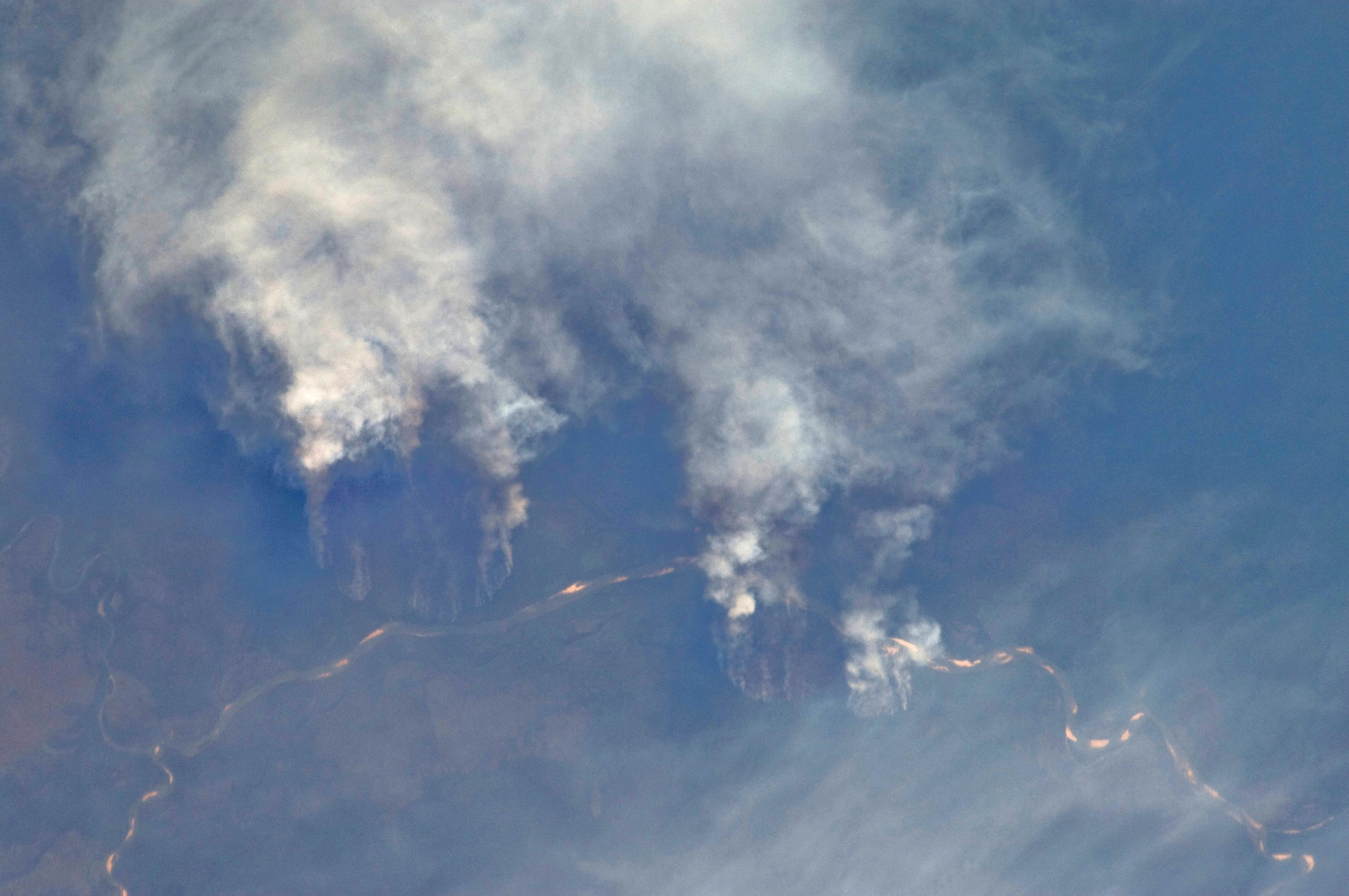
Smoke from burning along the Xingu River. Burning is a common agricultural practice in Brazil, but releases large amounts of carbon into the atmosphere and causes great losses in biodiversity.

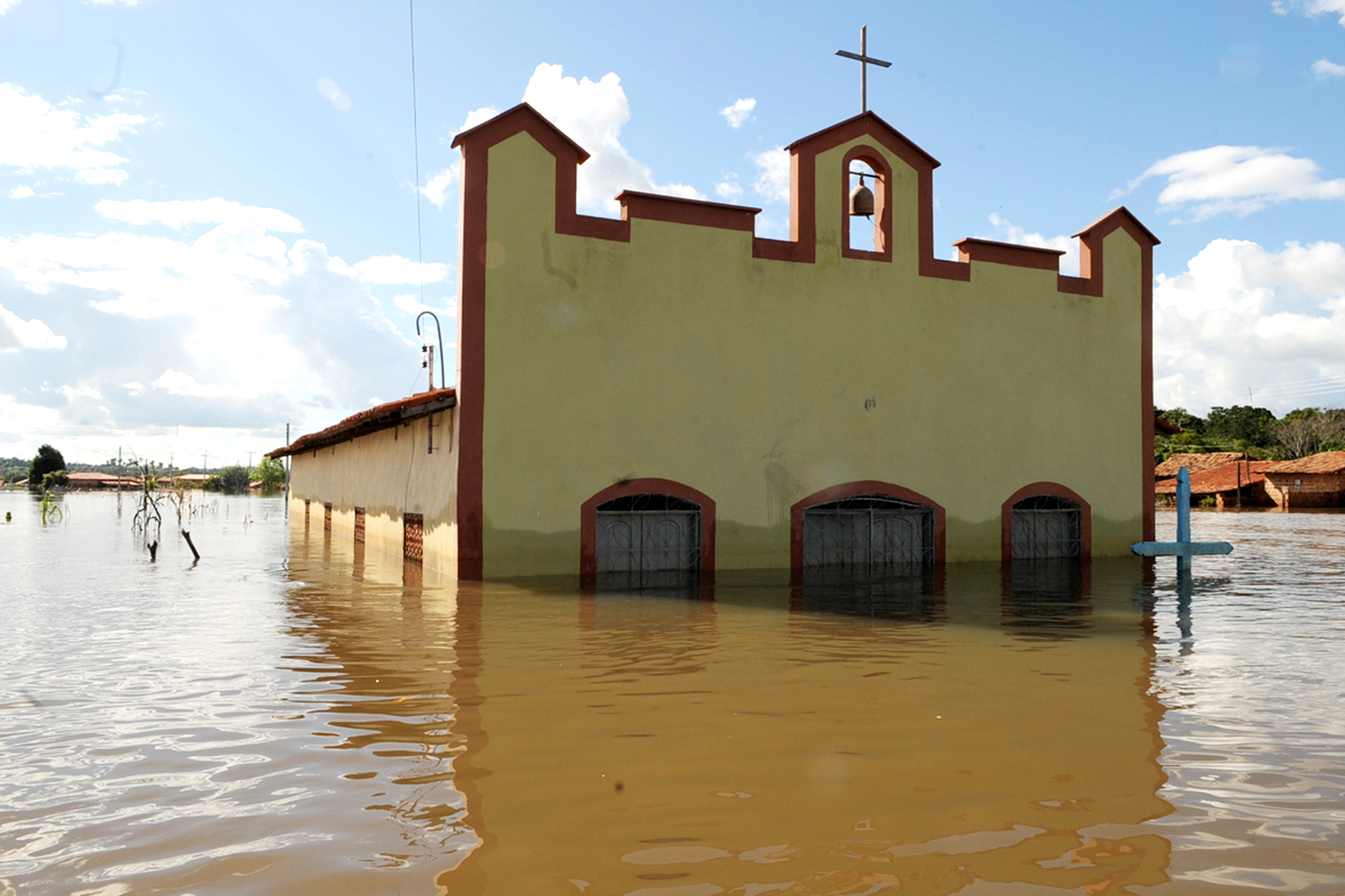
Trizidela do Vale underwater in the 2009 flood.

In the executive summary of the 1st PBMC Report, the limitations of the study are highlighted. Because some projections were made based on incomplete data, there is some uncertainty about the conclusions. Despite this,

"In general, the results of the models managed to capture the behavior of the present climate very well and, thus, despite the uncertainties, the projections of future climate changes throughout the 21st century are plausible. Therefore, such projections constitute innovative and valuable information both for the purpose of mitigation, as well as the planning of adaptation and minimization of impacts and vulnerability actions with the set of inhabiting society in different Brazilian biomes. Taking into account the different projections that imply potential impacts on natural and human systems (socioeconomic and environmental), it is already possible to analyze the expected impacts of climate change in the various sectors of Brazil, and the planning and decision making to define adaptation strategies and mitigation policies."

For the Semi-Arid-Caatinga, an increase of up to 4.5 °C in air temperature and a reduction of up to 50% in rainfall are predicted. The environment, naturally very dry and with sparse vegetation, can partially become desert. For the Cerrado the disturbances would be similar, with an increase in temperature of up to 5.5 °C and a decrease of up to 45% in rainfall. The Cerrado today concentrates most of the agricultural activities in Brazil. The Pantanal would also be very affected, with up to a 4.5 °C increase and up to 45% less rain. In the Atlantic Forest, the climate would stay up to 3 °C warmer and up to 30% rainier. For Pampa, there would be up to 3 °C increase in temperature averages, and rains up to 40% above normal.

Not only will precipitation totals change, it may start to occur in more erratic and violent patterns, with more intense and prolonged droughts and more severe and frequent flooding episodes, varying in different regions. According to the report, "the scenarios point to a decrease in rainfall in the winter months across the country, as well as in the summer in eastern Amazonia and the Northeast. [...] In contrast, the country could experience an increase in the frequency and intensity of intense rain in the subtropical region (South region and part of the Southeast) and in the extreme west of the Amazon." Changes in the levels and availability of groundwater are also foreseen.

=== Sea level rise ===
Measurements on the coast of São Paulo indicate that sea level has risen 30 cm in the last century, surpassing the world average, and there are already many signs of coastal erosion, groundwater is gradually salted, the hangovers become higher, causing damage to the infrastructure of coastal cities. Twenty beaches are in danger of disappearing. In Recife, the famous Boa Viagem beach lost some sections swallowed by the sea, and Olinda lost 59% of its strip of sand between 1995 and 2010.

=== Ecosystems ===
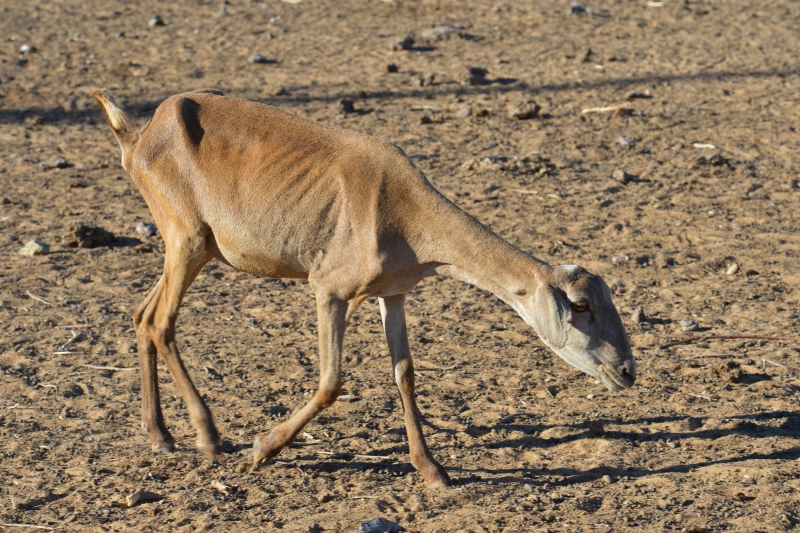
Emaciated goat in Petrolina, 2013, in the worst drought of the last 50 years in the Northeastern Semi-arid. The Semi-Arid is one of the biomes that should receive even less rain until 2100, aggravating a chronic situation of water scarcity.

Brazil's ecosystems will be impacted by temperature changes and rainfall changes. In the projections of the 1st Report, by the end of the 21st century, the Amazon may experience a reduction of up to 45% in rainfall, and an increase in the average temperature of up to 6 °C. This comes close to the worst scenarios foreseen by the Intergovernmental Panel on Climate Change (IPCC), which predicted important changes in most of the biome. However, the impact of deforestation was not considered in the assessment, which will certainly increase the levels of variation to some extent. The evolution of the future scenario will depend on the country's success in managing the serious threats to the biome. After a decade-long trend of reduced deforestation rates, recent years have documented a rapid increase in destruction of trees. A report estimated that if 40% of the forest disappears, droughts will increase and turn much of the forest into savanna. This will result in a drastic reduction in biodiversity and will also have a negative effect on the amount of rain Brazil can expect.

== Impacts on people ==
=== Economic impacts ===
There are multiple impacts of climate change on basic Brazilian production systems, such as increasing existing shortages and increasing production costs. It is also expected that more and more serious natural disasters will occur. This will likely result in major problems for food supply, public health, industrial production, trade, installed infrastructure, the general quality of life of the population and national security as a whole, with the poor suffering the most serious consequences. The areas most vulnerable to major impacts are the Northeast and Southeast regions, exactly where most of the Brazilian people are concentrated, and large cities, which in general are poorly prepared to face the challenge.

==== Agriculture ====
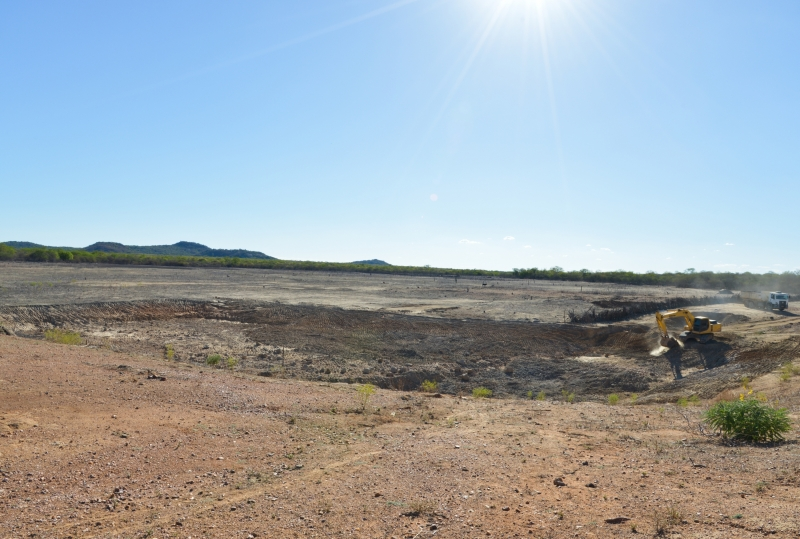
Empty reservoir in Petrolina, in the hinterland of Pernambuco, in the drought of 2013.

In the agricultural sector, the impacts of climate change in Brazil would be multiple and significant. Climate change is projected to reduce the availability of arable land through sea-level rise, salinization, flooding, and other climate-related impacts. As global warming also produces chemical and physical changes in the ocean that affect marine ecosystems, Bangladesh's fisheries are expected to face challenges from declining fish stocks and shifts in the geographic distribution of commercially important species.

A 2008 study, directly inspired by the work of the IPCC, especially in the Fourth Report, was produced by Embrapa focusing on agribusiness and food security. Its main conclusions are:

- Global warming can jeopardize Brazilian food production, leading to losses that can reach 7.4 billion reals in 2020 and up to 14 billion in 2070;
- Soy, whose explosive growth in the last 30 years has triggered an unprecedented change in the country's economic structure, is likely to be the crop most affected. In the worst-case scenario, losses could reach 40% in 2070, leading to a loss of up to 7.6 billion reals;
- Coffee is expected to lose up to 33% of the low-risk area in the main producing states, São Paulo and Minas Gerais, although it may have gains in the south of the country;
- Corn, rice, beans, cotton and sunflower will suffer a strong reduction of low risk area in the Northeast, with significant loss of production.
- Cassava will have a general gain in low risk area, but will likely suffer severe losses in the Northeast;
- Sugarcane, one of the few favored crops, could double its area in the coming decades.

"From one of the villains of global warming (See note:), agriculture can become a victim. Throughout the world, warming will only benefit agriculture practiced in high-latitude regions. ... The configuration of Brazilian agricultural production, as it is known today, can change significantly due to global warming. ... Regions that are currently the largest grain producers may not be able to plant well before the end of the century. ... Despite the losses, agriculture can be part of the solution to the problem. A more appropriate use of the soil, with the adoption, for example, of agropastoral, agro-forestry and no-tillage systems, besides reducing the use of fertilizers, can prevent new deforestation, increase the capture of carbon dioxide from the atmosphere and recover the soil. Some new techniques for growing rice and raising livestock are also being tested to decrease methane emissions".

In 2022, a study found that 28% of the agricultural land in Brazil is no longer climatically optimal for agriculture due to climate change and to change in local climate as a result of deforestation. The number will go up to 51% by 2030 and 74% by 2060 if the change in climate will continue in the same way.

==== Cattle Industry ====
The 2012 drought in the Northeast affected more than ten million people and generated a loss of more than R$16 billion. In 2013, the phenomenon was repeated with even greater intensity, being considered by the UN the worst of the last 50 years, leaving 1,200 municipalities in a state of emergency. In Paraíba alone, 360,000 heads of cattle died.

==== Energy sector ====
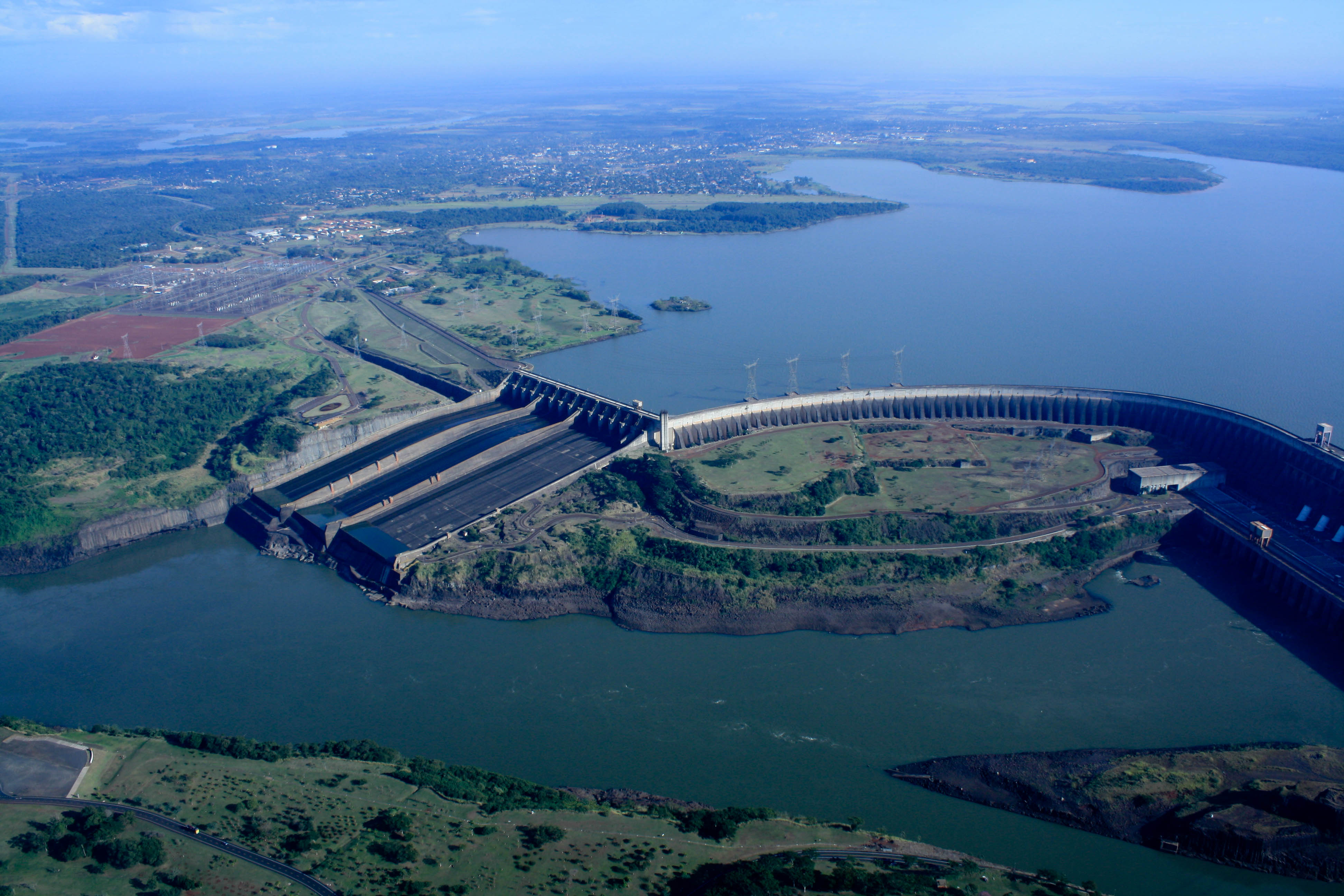
View of the spillway of the Itaipu Plant.

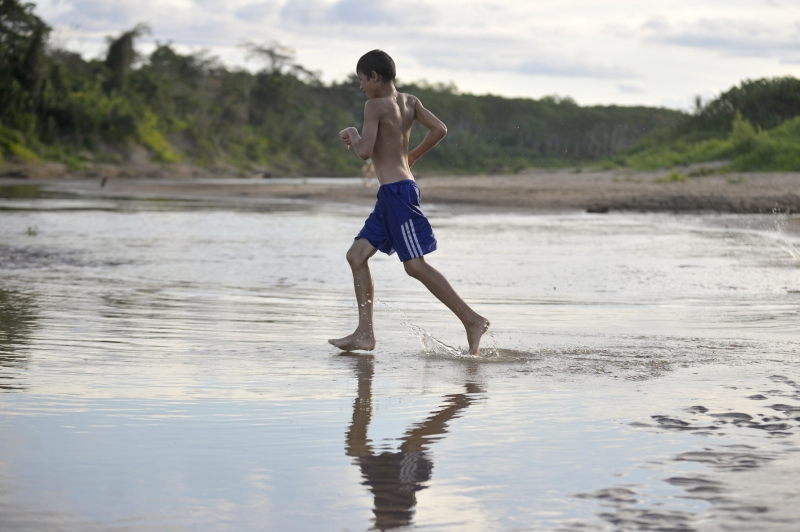
The 2012 Acre River drought allowed it to be crossed on foot. The Acre River has shown increasingly extreme levels, both in floods and droughts.

Climate change in Brazil may also result in an energy crisis, since the largest percentage of national electricity is generated by hydroelectric plants. It is expected that there will be an important drop in the flow of most of the great national hydrographic basins. According to the Climate Observatory,

"The result is dramatic for those who think that the Southeast of Brazil has suffered enough from lack of water and the threat of energy rationing in the last three years: in the best scenario, several rivers in Minas Gerais, São Paulo, Goiás, Tocantins, Bahia and Pará will have flow reductions of 10% to 30%. Transposed to hydroelectric plants, the flow data presents a challenge for the energy sector in Brazil: the most important plants in the country – Furnas, Itaipu, Sobradinho and Tucuruí – would have flow reductions of 38% to 57% in the worst case scenario. In the Amazon, a region elected by the government as the new frontier for hydroelectricity in the country, the falls would also be significant, as the Climate Observatory said in April: the flow of Belo Monte would fall from 25% to 55%, that of Santo Antônio, from 40% to 65%, and that of the planned plant in São Luís do Tapajós, from 20% to 30%. With the exception of São Luís, most of the new plants in the Amazon are run-of-river, that is, they do not have a large reservoir. This means that its capacity factor, that is, the amount of constant energy generated throughout the year, is reduced, since the flow of Amazonian rivers varies enormously between the dry and the rainy seasons. Belo Monte, for example, has a capacity factor of around 40%, which, reduced by half, would give the R$30 billion hydroelectric power plant a smaller capacity factor than that of wind farms – at which Brazilian energy planners and President Dilma Rousseff turn up their noses, as these plants are not capable of generating 'firm power' in periods without wind. In total, hydroelectric generation falls from 8% to 20% in the country. ...

"The researchers' analysis shows that, in all the scenarios analyzed, there is a drop in the flow of the main Brazilian hydrographic basins, which pushes the electrical system into a situation of structural imbalance: the system is unable to meet demand, causing load shedding – that is blackouts. Without measures to cut emissions, in the worst case scenario, the flow of reservoirs drops by 30% and the risk of deficit in some years approaches 100% – the margin considered 'safe' by the government to prevent blackouts is 5%. In the best scenario, the drop in flow from hydroelectric plants reaches 10%, and the risk of deficit, 60% in some years. The cost of operating the system, which takes into account even the activation of thermal plants, rises eight times in the best scenario and 16.7 times in the worst ".

This would have negative consequences in other ways, as it would encourage the use of coal and natural gas-fired power plants, which are major emitters of greenhouse gases.

=== Health impacts ===
==== Heat waves ====
A special alert was given in a 2015 report for the increased risk of extreme heat waves, mainly affecting the elderly and the North and Northeast regions, further aggravating pre-existing diseases, such as respiratory problems. José Feres, from the Institute of Applied Economic Research, said that Brazil's ageing population is particularly at risk. The report also pointed to the tendency towards an increase in endemic infectious diseases such as malaria, dengue and leptospirosis, the tendency towards an increase in the problems of conservation of the road network, and showed concern about Brazil's little preparation in the management of climatic disasters and the scarce information available on the future impacts of rising sea levels.

==== Floods and landslides ====
In the city of São Paulo alone, where rain is forecast to increase, flooding causes a loss of 762 million reals per year. In the floods and landslides in Rio de Janeiro in 2011, the greatest natural tragedy ever experienced in the country, 906 people died, 400 were reported missing, 30,000 had to leave their homes, 770 hillsides had their stability compromised, and will need to be reconsolidated at an estimated cost of 3.3 billion reals. The loss for companies reached R$470 million. In 2011, according to the UN calculation, floods throughout Brazil totaled 10 billion reals in material losses and claimed more than a thousand lives, in addition to leaving homeless crowds and producing disorders of various orders that will take years to be balanced.

A report from 2013 found that the coastal region, where the vast majority of the country's population lives, should receive special attention, in view of a likely increase in floods, landslides, severe weather, coastal erosion, rising sea levels and other natural disasters caused by warming: "It is no longer possible, as a Brazilian, to accept more disasters that kill more than a thousand Brazilians at once. Protective and preventive measures have to be taken urgently. Extreme events are happening more often. The population that is not prepared, will suffer from it."

=== Impacts on housing ===
Researcher Andrea Santos, executive secretary of PBMC, warned in 2013 about the likely impact on megacities such as Rio and São Paulo, stating that the current infrastructure, especially in transport and urban mobility, was not designed to face rising temperatures and more intense rainfall.

"Between 1991 and 2012, more than half of the Brazilian population had their lives affected by extreme weather events. Droughts, floods and landslides affected 127 million people. The number of records has grown 40% in the past decade compared to the previous one, according to the Brazilian Atlas of Natural Disasters. Recent tragedies include that of Santa Catarina, in 2008, and that of serra fluminense, in 2011. This year, a fifth of the country's municipalities entered an emergency or public calamity situation. Global warming, combined with urban expansion and the development problems that Brazil already has, allows us to project a gloomy scenario for this century, in which the number of people affected and the cost of tragedies for the economy only increase. And no one will be spared."

=== Impacts on indigenous peoples ===
Indigenous people consist of 40 million of the Latin American-Caribbean populations. They populate most of the rural poor areas in countries such as Ecuador, Brazil, Peru and Paraguay. This makes these populations extremely susceptible to threats of climate change due to socioeconomic, geographic, and political factors.

== Mitigation and adaptation ==
=== Policies and legislation ===
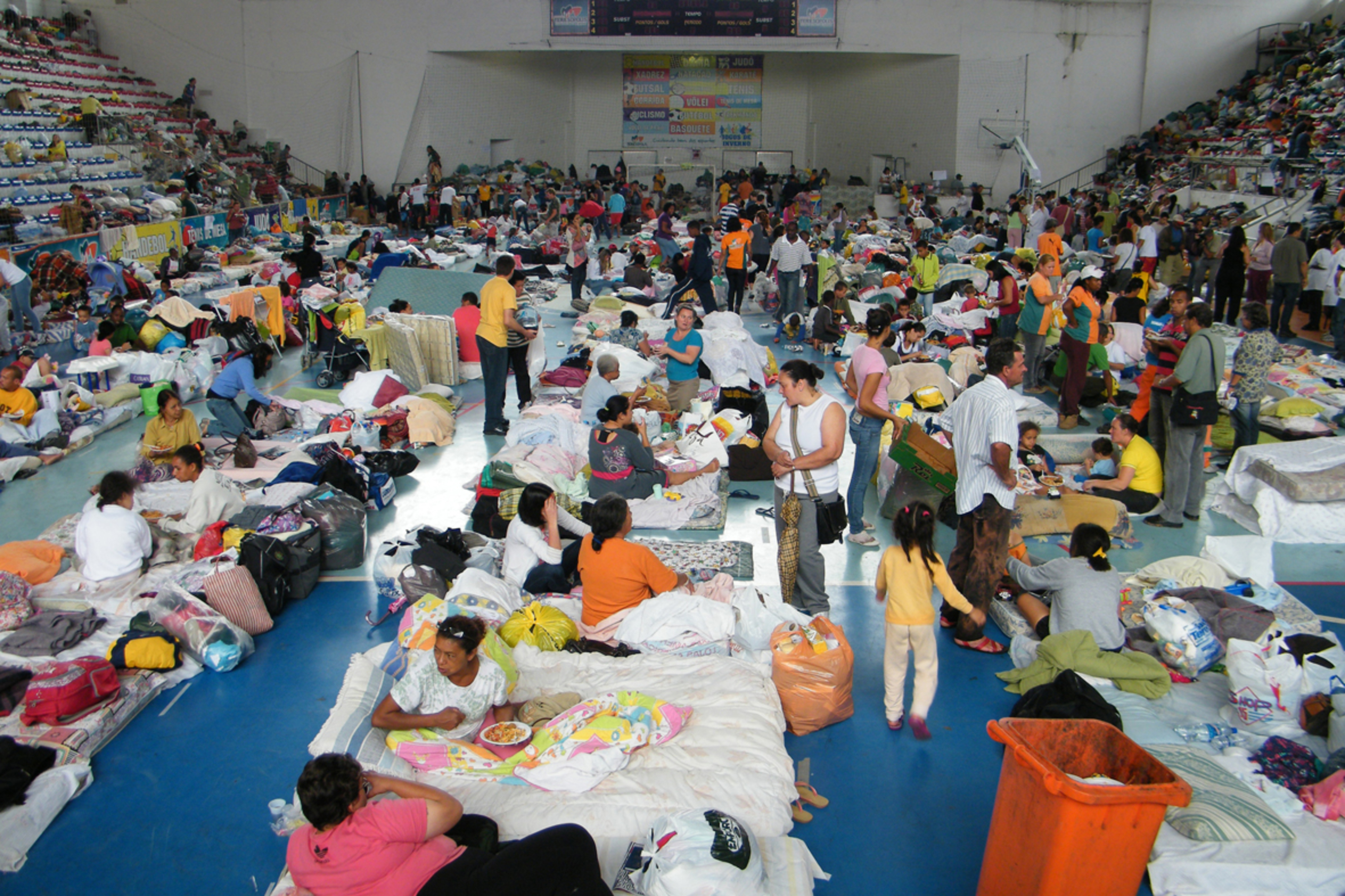
Homeless from the 2011 flood in Teresópolis, state of Rio, in the Southeast region, which according to forecasts should start receiving even more rains until the end of the century, increasing the risks for the population.

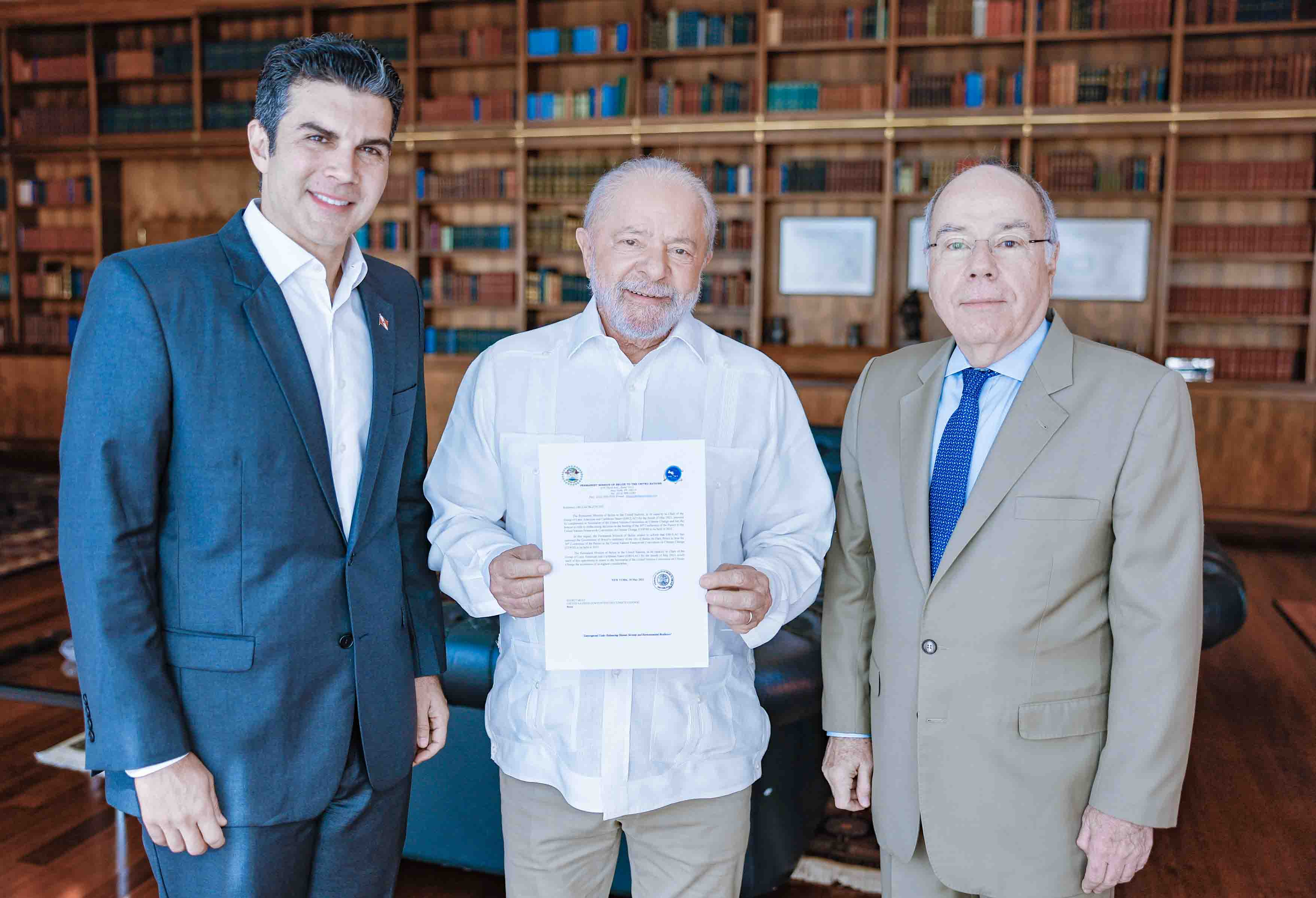
Brazilian president Luiz Inácio Lula da Silva (centre) announcing the intention to host the 2025 United Nations Climate Change conference in Belém.

Suzana Bustamante, one of the coordinators of Working Group 3 of the 5th IPCC Report, considers that the greatest threats hanging over Brazil stem from the expected reduction in rainfall in most of the area of food production and capture for hydroelectric and consumption, the country's strategy, both adaptive and mitigating, of investing in reducing deforestation must be a priority for the country, as forests are major producers and conservators of water resources, in addition to all the other essential environmental services they provide and all the biodiversity they harbor. Brazil is the most biodiverse country in the world, an invaluable wealth that is at great risk and is suffering continuous losses.

Jair Bolsonaro has said that foreigners should stop complaining about fires in the Amazon, and the country's environmental policies and in 2020 accused them of a "brutal disinformation campaign." In 2021, Brazil announced that it will not block carbon market agreements in COP26 what has significant importance.

==== Brazil 2040: scenarios and alternatives for adapting to climate change ====
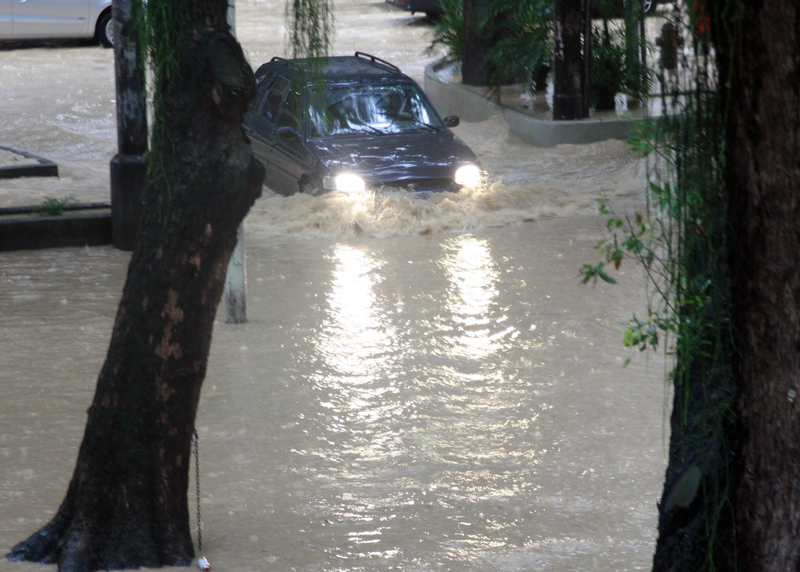
Difficulties of urban mobility in the torrential rains of April 6, 2010 in the city of Rio.

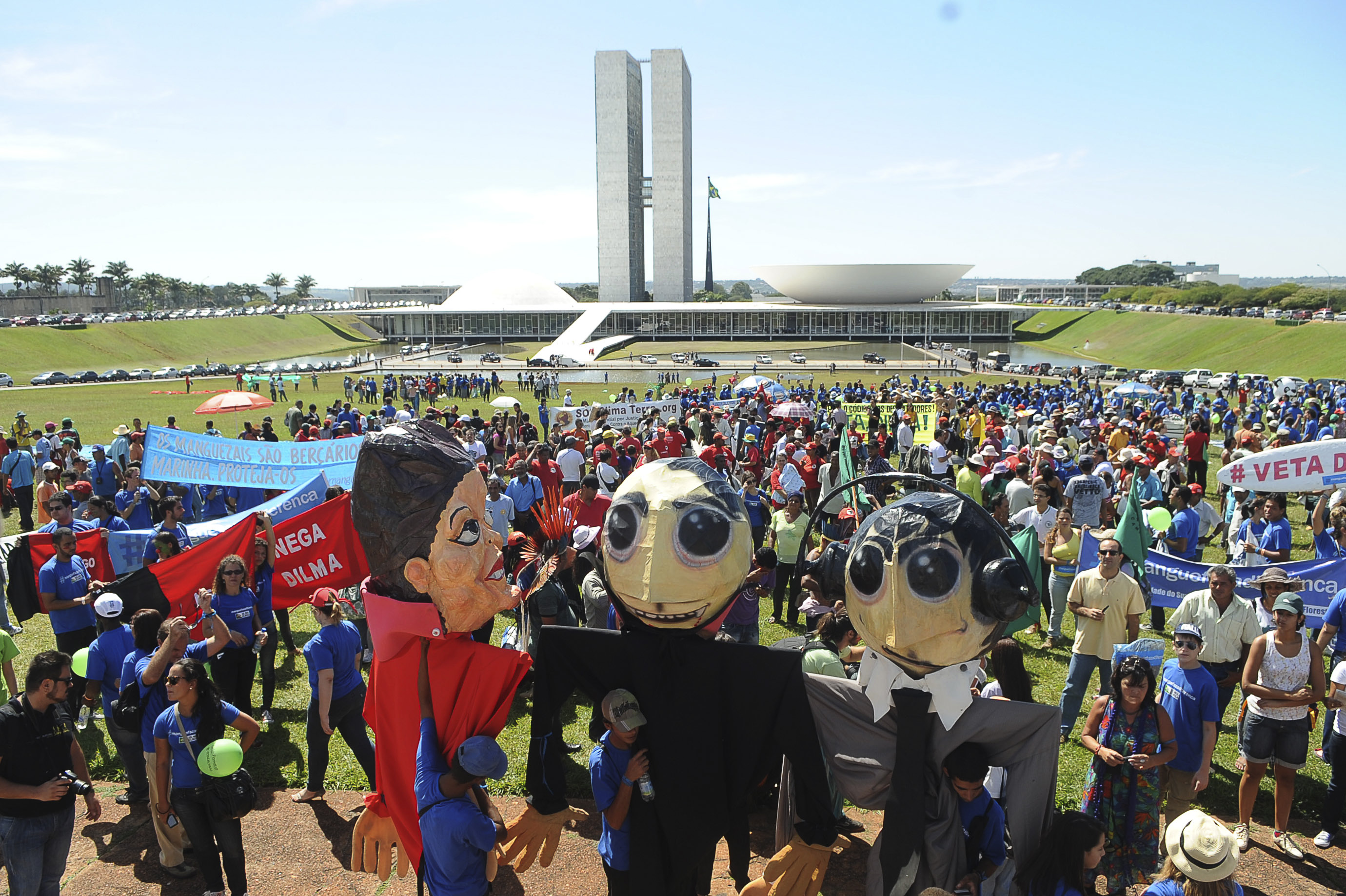
Protesters at the Esplanada dos Ministérios in Brasília against the approval of the New Brazilian Forest Code.

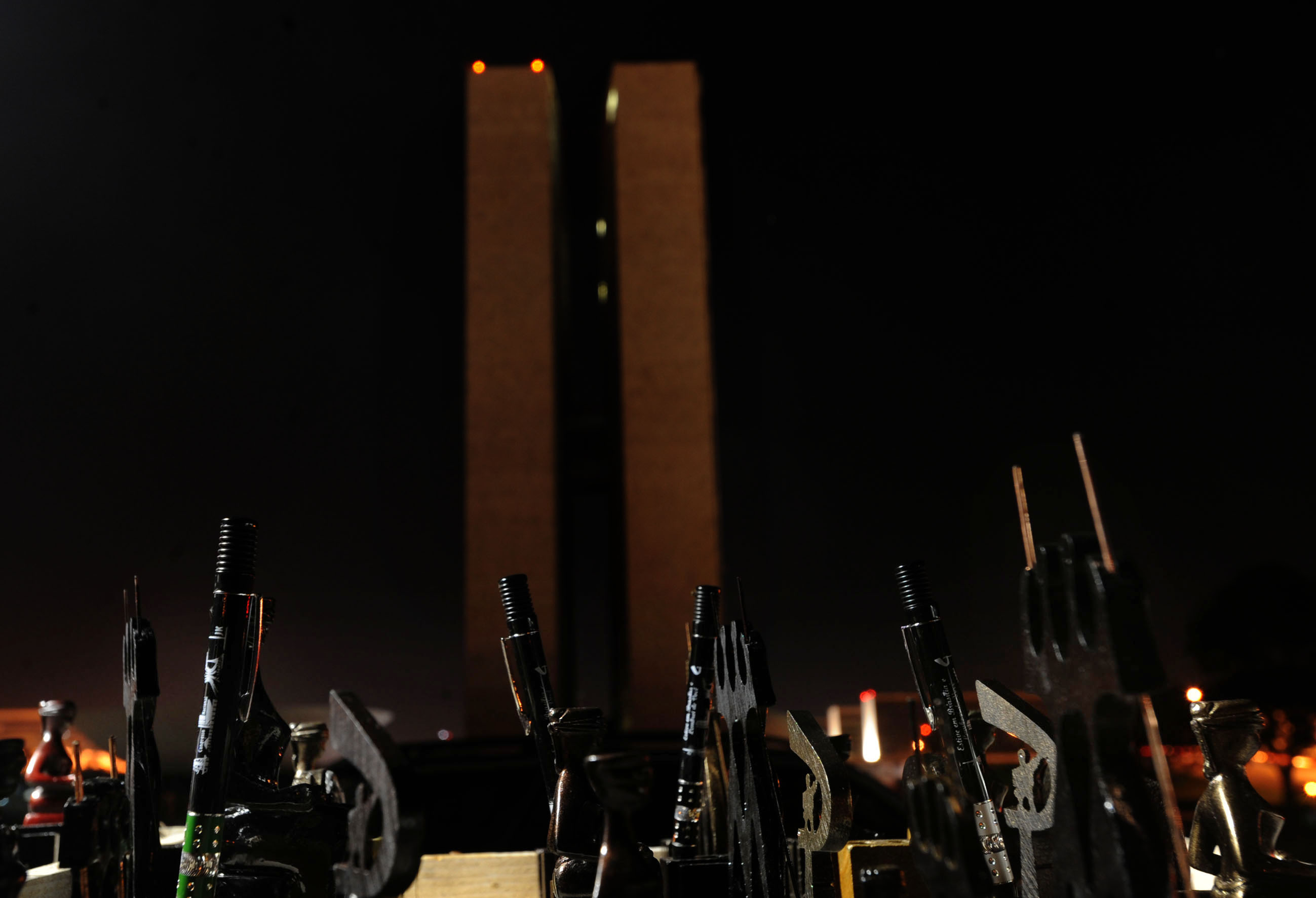
Praça dos Três Poderes, in Brasília, in the dark during Earth Hour 2011, an international campaign promoted by the World Wide Fund for Nature to raise awareness about warming and environmental problems.

Published in 2015 by the Secretariat for Sustainable Development of the Secretariat for Strategic Affairs of the Presidency of the Republic, the Brazil 2040 report was considered by the Climate Observatory to be the largest study carried out to date on climate change in Brazil. It had the main objective of giving guidance to the government for the establishment of a more coherent and solid climate policy, focusing on the areas of health, water resources, energy, agriculture and infrastructure (coastal and transport), and using two theoretical models that were used by the IPCC. The report obtained results that are broadly consistent with other studies, pointing to a country that is mostly drier and warmer in the future.

Brazil 2040 emphasized the country's lack of preparedness to face the expected climatic disasters that are expected to worsen with the progress of climate change, such as major droughts and floods, storms, rising levels sea and landslides caused by torrential rains. It was also identified that despite the numerous mitigation and adaptation programs already approved by the Union, States and Municipalities, they typically do not leave the paper, or produce timid or marginal results. Analyzing the case of the emergency support structure in the city of Rio de Janeiro, it was pointed out that the majority of the resources for assisting the population (hospitals, military and police facilities, fire departments, etc.) are located in medium or high areas. Vulnerability to natural disasters, along rivers and canals or in low-lying regions, which can easily flood, or at the seaside, subject to rising levels and coastal storms, and can be compromised even in small climatic events, harming their functionality and increasing impacts on society. The majority of water and sewage treatment plants are located in the same regions, as well as many points on the main highways and streets, including some major road junctions, offering increased risks in the event of a disaster in terms of sanitation, supply and transportation of flagellates. Even worse is the situation of transportation by the subway, which is mostly in regions of high vulnerability. Citing the threat of sea level rise, it was pointed out that there is real estate value in the order of 124 billion reals located in areas of high vulnerability, and 2.7 trillion reals in areas of medium vulnerability. In the case of the city of Santos, most of the urban area is in an area of high vulnerability and many in areas of very high vulnerability, which puts the entire city at high risk, with more than R$100 billion in real estate values in regions of high vulnerability. The report stated that these examples can be extrapolated to many other regions of Brazil with a high demographic density, since most cities are in low coastal regions or next to rivers, lakes and fragile hillsides. Port areas also present increased risks of deterioration or destruction of structures, flooding, silting of channels and estuarine bars and others, and a large part of Brazil's national and international trade depends on them.

Suzana Kahn Ribeiro, president of the Scientific Committee of the Brazilian Panel on Climate Change, has a very similar opinion: "Brazil needs to find a direction, define what it wants to be when it grows up. ... Brazil is showing mixed signals all the time. We reduce IPI tax on car so that everyone gets bottled up in traffic. We are experiencing a blackout of climate coordination ". André Ferretti, general coordinator of the Climate Observatory, says the same:

"Today we have trillions of resources to be invested in infrastructure, plans to expand energy generation mainly from fossil sources (about 70% of the country's investments), annual harvest plans and industry incentives, without any connection with the logic of development. low carbon. We have a set of disconnected climate policies, without coordination and that do not even have their potential positive impacts monitored; and the Climate Fund is completely threatened and with limited resources. ... The great message of the IPCC's fifth report is that the situation is increasingly critical, and that if nothing or very little is done, we will enter a very dangerous path. The window of opportunity for us to prevent the collapse of the climate system is narrow."

Even some sectors of the government agree that there are problems in this area: Carlos Nobre, secretary of Research and Development Policies and Programs at the Ministry of Science, Technology and Innovation, said that "the Ministry of Science and Technology is playing its part, investing in research development and knowledge generation, but there is still a lack of integration between research and policy making."

Another of Brazil's latest Nationally Determined Contribution to the Paris Agreement aims to reduce greenhouse gas emissions by 48 percent by 2025 and 53 percent by 2030. President Luiz Inácio “Lula” da Silva has prioritized combating climate change, reestablishing the Amazon Fund to prevent deforestation and promote sustainable use of the Amazon. The United States Agency for International Development supports these efforts through initiatives focusing on biodiversity conservation, sustainable management of protected areas, and innovative financial instruments for nature-based solutions.

==== USAID’s Climate Change Program: Objectives and Results ====
USAID's climate change program in Brazil focuses on leveraging resources from the private sector for biodiversity conservation and improving local livelihoods. Key results from 2022 include avoiding more than 23 million metric tons of CO_{2} equivalent GHG emissions, strengthening the management of 117 Protected Areas covering 47.9 million hectares, and reducing deforestation rates in USAID-supported areas.

== Society and culture ==
=== Activism ===
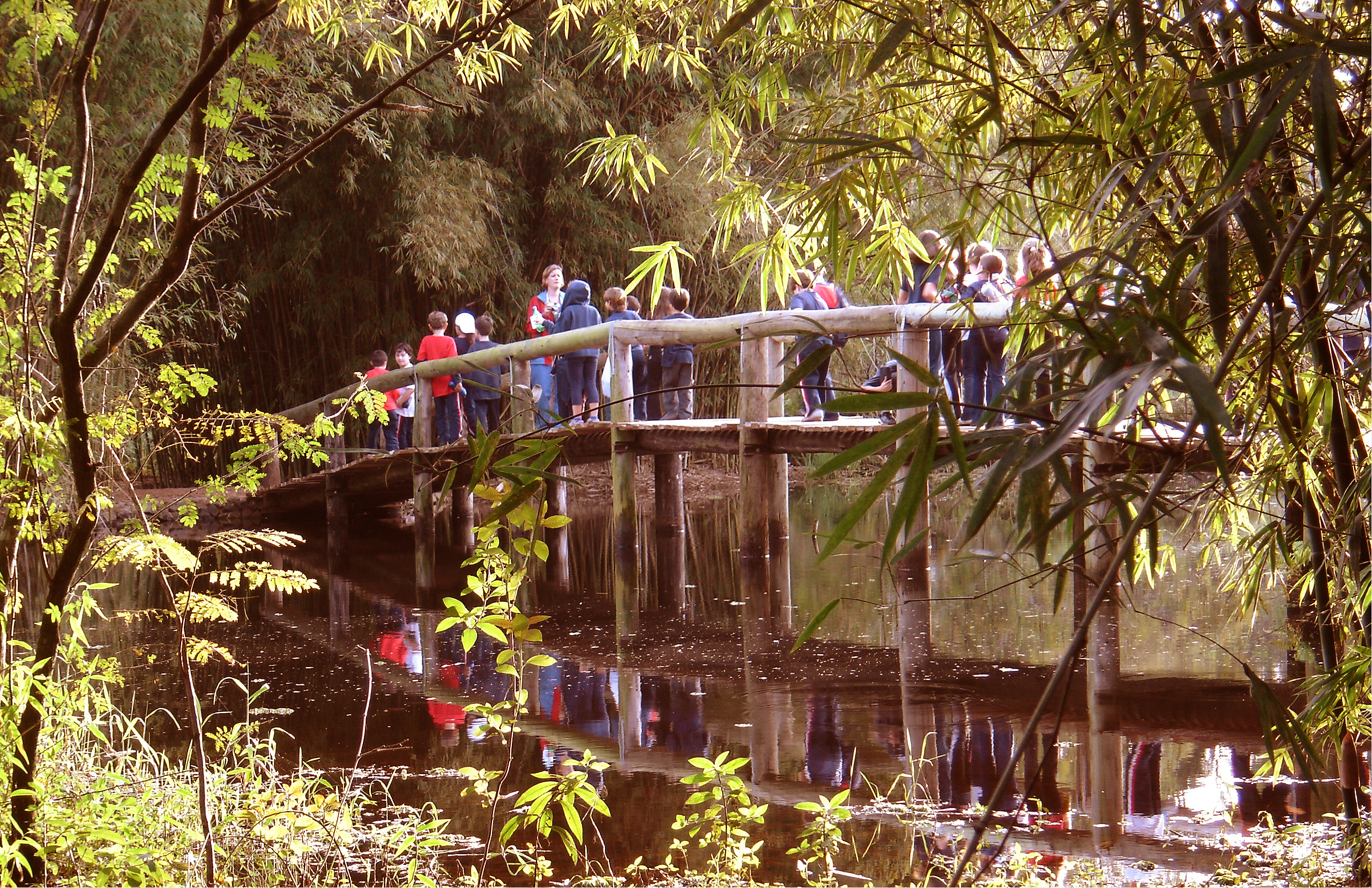
Environmental education since youth is essential to ensure the future of new generations.

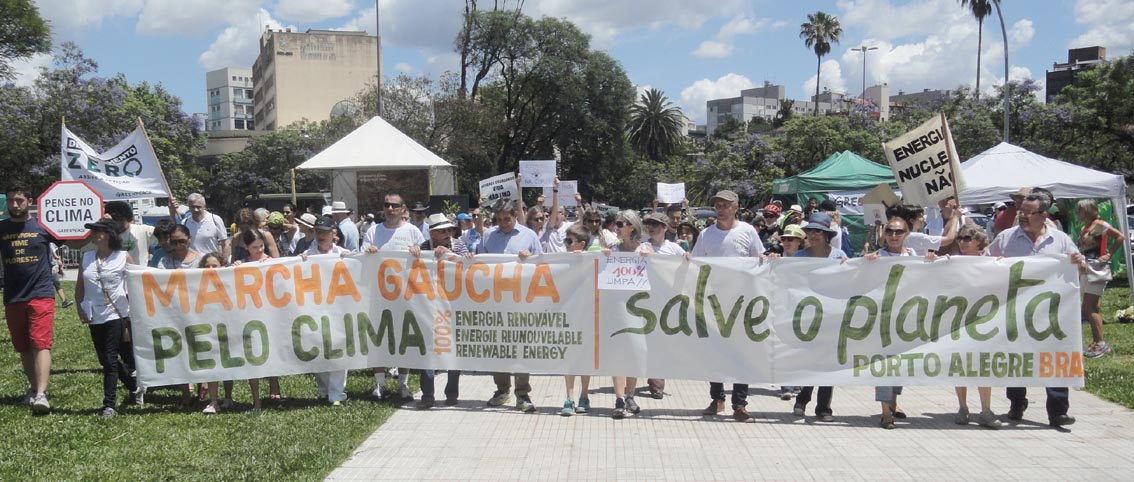
Gaúcha March for Climate, Porto Alegre, 2015.

Calculations in 2021 showed that, for giving the world a 50% chance of avoiding a temperature rise of 2 degrees or more, Brazil should increase its climate commitments by 90%. For a 95% chance, it should increase the commitments by 165%. For giving a 50% chance of staying below 1.5 degrees Brazil, should increase its commitments by 170%.

A report from 2013 aimed to dispel some ingrained myths that represent major obstacles to the general acceptance of mitigation projects, such as that progress and nature conservation are opposed, or that the consequence of reducing emissions will be economic recession.

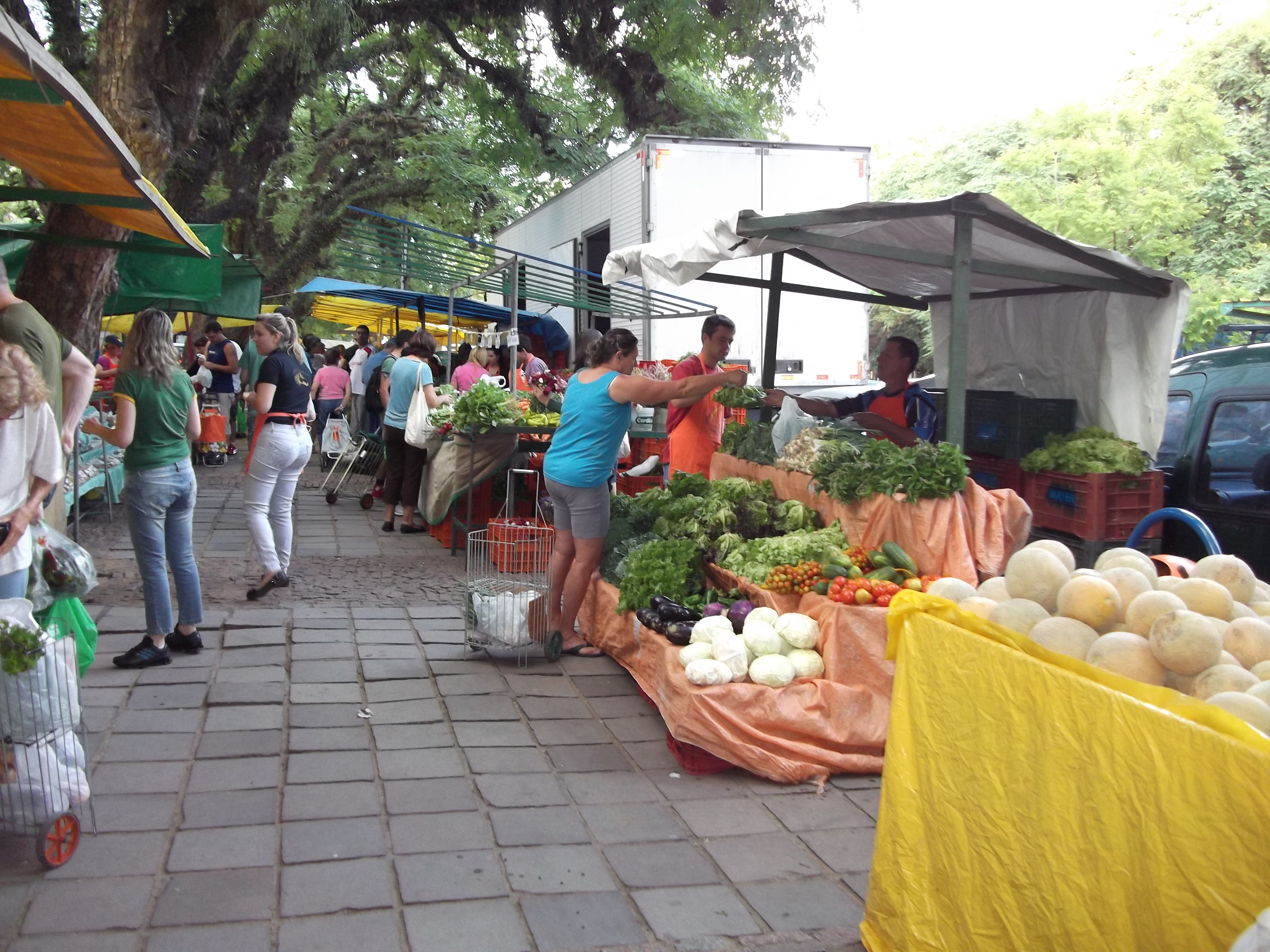
Ecological fair in Porto Alegre.

== See also ==
- Environmental issues in Brazil
- Plug-in electric vehicles in Brazil
