= Plug-in electric vehicles in Brazil =

As of 2021, 7% of new cars sold in Brazil were electric.

== Government policy ==
As of October 2022, the Brazilian government does not charge any import taxes on electric vehicles.

== Charging stations ==
As of 2022, there were 1,300 public charging stations in Brazil.

== Public opinion ==
In a 2022 survey conducted by Tupinambá Energia, 58% of prospective car buyers were interested in buying an electric vehicle.

== By state ==
=== Goiás ===
As of November 2022, there were 27 public charging stations in Goiás.

As of November 2022, there were 19 public charging stations in Goiânia.

=== Rio de Janeiro ===
As of November 2022, there were about 3,000 electric vehicles in the state of Rio de Janeiro.

As of November 2022, there were about 2,000 electric vehicles in the city of Rio de Janeiro.

=== São Paulo ===
As of August 2022, there were 445 public charging stations in the city of São Paulo.
